= Gorny (inhabited locality) =

Gorny (Russian: Го́рный; masculine), Gornaya (Го́рная; feminine), or Gornoye (Го́рное; neuter) is the name of several inhabited localities in Russia.

== Modern localities ==
=== Altai Krai ===
As of 2013, one rural locality in Altai Krai bears this name:

- Gorny, Altai Krai, a settlement in Ust-Ishinsky Selsoviet of Krasnogorsky District; 52°10′N 86°4′E

=== Amur Oblast ===
As of 2013, one rural locality in Amur Oblast bears this name:

- Gorny, Amur Oblast, a settlement in Gornensky Rural Settlement of Zeysky District

=== Republic of Bashkortostan ===
As of 2013, five rural localities in the Republic of Bashkortostan bear this name:

- Gorny, Arkhangelsky District, Republic of Bashkortostan, a village in Arkh-Latyshsky Selsoviet of Arkhangelsky District
- Gorny, Chishminsky District, Republic of Bashkortostan, a selo in Kara-Yakupovsky Selsoviet of Chishminsky District
- Gorny, Kushnarenkovsky District, Republic of Bashkortostan, a village in Kushnarenkovsky Selsoviet of Kushnarenkovsky District
- Gorny, Tuymazinsky District, Republic of Bashkortostan, a village in Starotuymazinsky Selsoviet of Tuymazinsky District
- Gornoye, Republic of Bashkortostan, a village in Urgushevsky Selsoviet of Karaidelsky District

=== Bryansk Oblast ===
As of 2013, one rural locality in Bryansk Oblast bears this name:

- Gorny, Bryansk Oblast, a settlement in Gartsevsky Rural Administrative Okrug of Starodubsky District; 52°42′N 33°6′E

=== Republic of Buryatia ===
As of 2013, one rural locality in the Republic of Buryatia bears this name:

- Gorny, Republic of Buryatia, a settlement under the administrative jurisdiction of Kamensk Urban-Type Settlement in Kabansky District

=== Chelyabinsk Oblast ===
As of 2013, four rural localities in Chelyabinsk Oblast bear this name:

- Gorny, Miass, Chelyabinsk Oblast, a settlement under the administrative jurisdiction of the City of Miass
- Gorny, Agapovsky District, Chelyabinsk Oblast, a settlement in Svetlogorsky Selsoviet of Agapovsky District
- Gorny, Argayashsky District, Chelyabinsk Oblast, a settlement in Ayazgulovsky Selsoviet of Argayashsky District
- Gornaya, a village in Velikopetrovsky Selsoviet of Kartalinsky District

=== Irkutsk Oblast ===
As of 2013, one rural locality in Irkutsk Oblast bears this name:

- Gorny, Irkutsk Oblast, a settlement in Irkutsky District

=== Jewish Autonomous Oblast ===
As of 2013, one rural locality in the Jewish Autonomous Oblast bears this name:

- Gornoye, Jewish Autonomous Oblast, a selo in Leninsky District

=== Kaluga Oblast ===
As of 2013, one rural locality in Kaluga Oblast bears this name:

- Gornoye, Kaluga Oblast, a village in Meshchovsky District

=== Khabarovsk Krai ===
As of 2013, one urban locality in Khabarovsk Krai bears this name:

- Gorny, Khabarovsk Krai, a work settlement in Solnechny District

=== Khanty-Mansi Autonomous Okrug ===
As of 2013, one rural locality in Khanty-Mansi Autonomous Okrug bears this name:

- Gorny, Khanty-Mansi Autonomous Okrug, a settlement in Surgutsky District

=== Krasnodar Krai ===
As of 2013, three rural localities in Krasnodar Krai bear this name:

- Gorny, Novorossiysk, Krasnodar Krai, a khutor in Verkhnebakansky Rural Okrug under the administrative jurisdiction of Primorsky City District of the City of Novorossiysk
- Gorny, Tuapsinsky District, Krasnodar Krai, a settlement in Shaumyansky Rural Okrug of Tuapsinsky District
- Gornoye, Krasnodar Krai, a selo in Akhmetovsky Rural Okrug of Labinsky District

=== Krasnoyarsk Krai ===
As of 2013, one rural locality in Krasnoyarsk Krai bears this name:

- Gorny, Krasnoyarsk Krai, a settlement in Gorny Selsoviet of Achinsky District

=== Novgorod Oblast ===
As of 2013, two rural localities in Novgorod Oblast bear this name:

- Gorny, Novgorod Oblast, a settlement in Antsiferovskoye Settlement of Khvoyninsky District
- Gornoye, Novgorod Oblast, a village in Molvotitskoye Settlement of Maryovsky District

=== Novosibirsk Oblast ===
As of 2013, two inhabited localities in Novosibirsk Oblast bear this name:

Urban localities

- Gorny, Toguchinsky District, Novosibirsk Oblast, a work settlement in Toguchinsky District

Rural localities

- Gorny, Moshkovsky District, Novosibirsk Oblast, a settlement in Moshkovsky District

=== Orenburg Oblast ===
As of 2013, four rural localities in Orenburg Oblast bear this name:

- Gorny, Asekeyevsky District, Orenburg Oblast, a settlement in Ryazanovsky Selsoviet of Asekeyevsky District
- Gorny, Krasnogvardeysky District, Orenburg Oblast, a settlement in Yashkinsky Selsoviet of Krasnogvardeysky District
- Gorny, Novosergiyevsky District, Orenburg Oblast, a settlement in Kuvaysky Selsoviet of Novosergiyevsky District
- Gorny, Orenburgsky District, Orenburg Oblast, a settlement in Gorny Selsoviet of Orenburgsky District

=== Perm Krai ===
As of 2013, two rural localities in Perm Krai bear this name:

- Gorny, Permsky District, Perm Krai, two settlements in Permsky District

=== Primorsky Krai ===
As of 2013, three rural localities in Primorsky Krai bear this name:

- Gorny, Primorsky Krai, a settlement in Kirovsky District
- Gornoye, Mikhaylovsky District, Primorsky Krai, a settlement in Mikhaylovsky District
- Gornoye, Nadezhdinsky District, Primorsky Krai, a settlement in Nadezhdinsky District

=== Rostov Oblast ===
As of 2013, two inhabited localities in Rostov Oblast bear this name:

Urban localities

- Gorny, Krasnosulinsky District, Rostov Oblast, a work settlement in Krasnosulinsky District

Rural localities

- Gorny, Semikarakorsky District, Rostov Oblast, a settlement in Bolshemechetnovskoye Rural Settlement of Semikarakorsky District

=== Sakhalin Oblast ===
As of 2013, two rural localities in Sakhalin Oblast bear this name:

- Gornoye, Kurilsky District, Sakhalin Oblast, a selo in Kurilsky District
- Gornoye, Makarovsky District, Sakhalin Oblast, a selo in Makarovsky District

=== Samara Oblast ===
As of 2013, one rural locality in Samara Oblast bears this name:

- Gorny, Samara Oblast, a settlement in Koshkinsky District

=== Saratov Oblast ===
As of 2013, three inhabited localities in Saratov Oblast bear this name:

Urban localities

- Gorny, Krasnopartizansky District, Saratov Oblast, a work settlement in Krasnopartizansky District

Rural localities

- Gorny, Ozinsky District, Saratov Oblast, a settlement in Ozinsky District
- Gorny, Volsky District, Saratov Oblast, a settlement in Volsky District

=== Stavropol Krai ===
As of 2013, four rural localities in Stavropol Krai bear this name:

- Gorny, Budyonnovsky District, Stavropol Krai, a khutor in Krasnooktyabrsky Selsoviet of Budyonnovsky District
- Gorny, Novoselitsky District, Stavropol Krai, a khutor in Novomayaksky Selsoviet of Novoselitsky District
- Gorny, Petrovsky District, Stavropol Krai, a settlement in Rogato-Balkovsky Selsoviet of Petrovsky District
- Gorny, Predgorny District, Stavropol Krai, a settlement in Yessentuksky Selsoviet of Predgorny District

=== Sverdlovsk Oblast ===
As of 2013, two rural localities in Sverdlovsk Oblast bear this name:

- Gorny, Garinsky District, Sverdlovsk Oblast, a settlement in Garinsky District
- Gorny, Kamensky District, Sverdlovsk Oblast, a settlement in Kamensky District

=== Tula Oblast ===
As of 2013, one rural locality in Tula Oblast bears this name:

- Gorny, Tula Oblast, a settlement in Boryatinsky Rural Okrug of Volovsky District

=== Ulyanovsk Oblast ===
As of 2013, one rural locality in Ulyanovsk Oblast bears this name:

- Gorny, Ulyanovsk Oblast, a settlement in Fabrichno-vyselkovsky Rural Okrug of Novospassky District

=== Vologda Oblast ===
As of 2013, one rural locality in Vologda Oblast bears this name:

- Gornoye, Vologda Oblast, a village in Staroselsky Selsoviet of Vologodsky District

=== Yaroslavl Oblast ===
As of 2013, one rural locality in Yaroslavl Oblast bears this name:

- Gorny, Yaroslavl Oblast, a settlement in Lyubilkovsky Rural Okrug of Rostovsky District

=== Zabaykalsky Krai ===
As of 2013, one urban locality in Zabaykalsky Krai bears this name:

- Gorny, Zabaykalsky Krai, an urban-type settlement in Ulyotovsky District

== Abolished localities ==
- Gorny, Volgograd Oblast, a settlement in Gornopolyansky Selsoviet under the administrative jurisdiction of Sovetsky City District under the administrative jurisdiction of the city of oblast significance of Volgograd in Volgograd Oblast; abolished in March 2010

== Alternative names ==
- Gorny, alternative name of Tashkazgan, a settlement in Svetlogorsky Selsoviet of Agapovsky District in Chelyabinsk Oblast; 53°3′N 59°1′E
- Gorny, alternative name of Gornoye, a settlement in Mikhaylovsky District of Primorsky Krai
- Gorny, alternative name of Gornoye, a settlement in Nadezhdinsky District of Primorsky Krai
- Gornaya, alternative name of Gornaya Shaldikha, a village in Putilovskoye Settlement Municipal Formation of Kirovsky District in Leningrad Oblast; 59°53′N 31°28′E
- Gornoye, alternative name of Arkhangelskoye, a selo in Starooskolsky District of Belgorod Oblast; 51°15′N 38°6′E
- Gornoye, alternative name of Spas-Doshchaty, a selo in Mashonovskoye Rural Settlement of Zaraysky District in Moscow Oblast; 54°54′N 38°48′E
