= Administrative divisions of Rostov Oblast =

Rostov Oblast Russia
- Administrative center: Rostov-on-Don

Administrative structure (as of 2012)
- Districts: 43
- Cities/towns: 23
- Urban-type settlements: 7
- Selsovets: 390

Municipal structure (as of 2002)
- Rural settlements: 2,276 (inhabited); 23 (uninhabited)

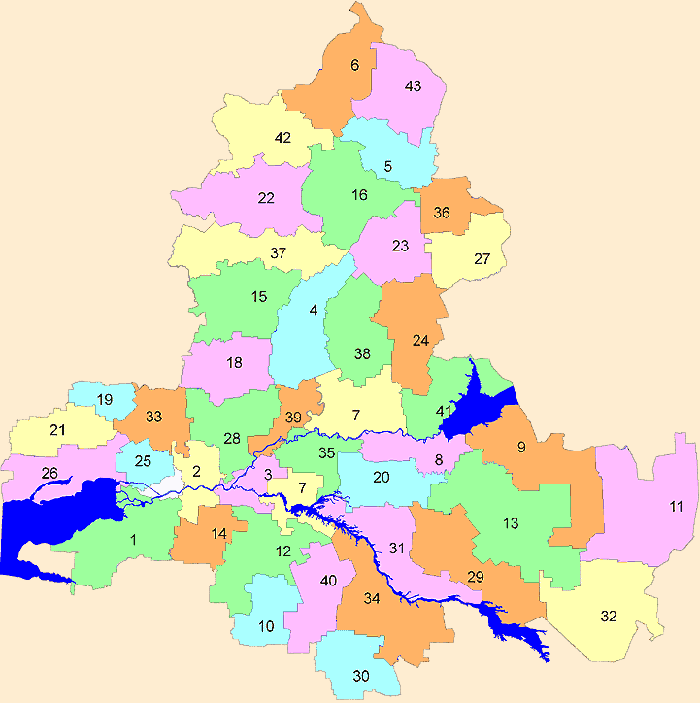
Map of Rostov Oblast (with numbered districts)

Rostov Oblast is a federal subject of Russia.

== Administrative and municipal divisions ==
- Cities and towns under the oblast's jurisdiction (12):
  - Rostov-on-Don (Ростов-на-Дону) (administrative center)
    - city districts:
      - Kirovsky (Кировский)
      - Leninsky (Ленинский)
      - Oktyabrsky (Октябрьский)
      - Pervomaysky (Первомайский)
      - Proletarsky (Пролетарский)
      - Sovetsky (Советский)
      - Voroshilovsky (Ворошиловский)
      - Zheleznodorozhny (Железнодорожный)
  - Azov (Азов)
  - Bataysk (Батайск)
  - Donetsk (Донецк)
  - Gukovo (Гуково)
  - Kamensk-Shakhtinsky (Каменск-Шахтинский)
  - Novocherkassk (Новочеркасск)
  - Novoshakhtinsk (Новошахтинск)
  - Shakhty (Шахты)
  - Taganrog (Таганрог)
  - Volgodonsk (Волгодонск)
  - Zverevo (Зверево)
- Districts (43):
  - Aksaysky (Аксайский)
    - Towns under the district's jurisdiction:
      - Aksay (Аксай)
    - with 10 selsovets under the district's jurisdiction.
  - Azovsky (Азовский)
    - with 18 selsovets under the district's jurisdiction.
  - Bagayevsky (Багаевский)
    - with 5 selsovets under the district's jurisdiction.
  - Belokalitvinsky (Белокалитвинский)
    - Towns under the district's jurisdiction:
      - Belaya Kalitva (Белая Калитва)
    - Urban-type settlements under the district's jurisdiction:
      - Sholokhovsky (Шолоховский)
    - with 10 selsovets under the district's jurisdiction.
  - Bokovsky (Боковский)
    - with 7 selsovets under the district's jurisdiction.
  - Chertkovsky (Чертковский)
    - with 14 selsovets under the district's jurisdiction.
  - Dubovsky (Дубовский)
    - with 13 selsovets under the district's jurisdiction.
  - Kagalnitsky (Кагальницкий)
    - with 8 selsovets under the district's jurisdiction.
  - Kamensky (Каменский)
    - Urban-type settlements under the district's jurisdiction:
      - Gluboky (Глубокий)
    - with 11 selsovets under the district's jurisdiction.
  - Kasharsky (Кашарский)
    - with 10 selsovets under the district's jurisdiction.
  - Konstantinovsky (Константиновский)
    - Towns under the district's jurisdiction:
      - Konstantinovsk (Константиновск)
    - with 6 selsovets under the district's jurisdiction.
  - Krasnosulinsky (Красносулинский)
    - Towns under the district's jurisdiction:
      - Krasny Sulin (Красный Сулин)
    - Urban-type settlements under the district's jurisdiction:
      - Gorny (Горный)
      - Uglerodovsky (Углеродовский)
    - with 12 selsovets under the district's jurisdiction.
  - Kuybyshevsky (Куйбышевский)
    - with 3 selsovets under the district's jurisdiction.
  - Martynovsky (Мартыновский)
    - with 9 selsovets under the district's jurisdiction.
  - Matveyevo-Kurgansky (Матвеево-Курганский)
    - with 8 selsovets under the district's jurisdiction.
  - Millerovsky (Миллеровский)
    - Towns under the district's jurisdiction:
      - Millerovo (Миллерово)
    - with 12 selsovets under the district's jurisdiction.
  - Milyutinsky (Милютинский)
    - with 7 selsovets under the district's jurisdiction.
  - Morozovsky (Морозовский)
    - Towns under the district's jurisdiction:
      - Morozovsk (Морозовск)
    - with 8 selsovets under the district's jurisdiction.
  - Myasnikovsky (Мясниковский)
    - with 7 selsovets under the district's jurisdiction.
  - Neklinovsky (Неклиновский)
    - with 18 selsovets under the district's jurisdiction.
  - Oblivsky (Обливский)
    - with 7 selsovets under the district's jurisdiction.
  - Oktyabrsky (Октябрьский)
    - Urban-type settlements under the district's jurisdiction:
      - Kamenolomni (Каменоломни)
    - with 11 selsovets under the district's jurisdiction.
  - Orlovsky (Орловский)
    - with 11 selsovets under the district's jurisdiction.
  - Peschanokopsky (Песчанокопский)
    - with 9 selsovets under the district's jurisdiction.
  - Proletarsky (Пролетарский)
    - Towns under the district's jurisdiction:
      - Proletarsk (Пролетарск)
    - with 9 selsovets under the district's jurisdiction.
  - Remontnensky (Ремонтненский)
    - with 10 selsovets under the district's jurisdiction.
  - Rodionovo-Nesvetaysky (Родионово-Несветайский)
    - with 6 selsovets under the district's jurisdiction.
  - Salsky (Сальский)
    - Towns under the district's jurisdiction:
      - Salsk (Сальск)
    - with 10 selsovets under the district's jurisdiction.
  - Semikarakorsky (Семикаракорский)
    - Towns under the district's jurisdiction:
      - Semikarakorsk (Семикаракорск)
    - with 9 selsovets under the district's jurisdiction.
  - Sholokhovsky (Шолоховский)
    - with 9 selsovets under the district's jurisdiction.
  - Sovetsky (Советский)
    - with 3 selsovets under the district's jurisdiction.
  - Tarasovsky (Тарасовский)
    - with 10 selsovets under the district's jurisdiction.
  - Tatsinsky (Тацинский)
    - Urban-type settlements under the district's jurisdiction:
      - Zhirnov (Жирнов)
    - with 10 selsovets under the district's jurisdiction.
  - Tselinsky (Целинский)
    - with 9 selsovets under the district's jurisdiction.
  - Tsimlyansky (Цимлянский)
    - Towns under the district's jurisdiction:
      - Tsimlyansk (Цимлянск)
    - with 6 selsovets under the district's jurisdiction.
  - Ust-Donetsky (Усть-Донецкий)
    - Urban-type settlements under the district's jurisdiction:
      - Ust-Donetsky (Усть-Донецкий)
    - with 7 selsovets under the district's jurisdiction.
  - Verkhnedonskoy (Верхнедонской)
    - with 10 selsovets under the district's jurisdiction.
  - Vesyolovsky (Весёловский)
    - with 4 selsovets under the district's jurisdiction.
  - Volgodonskoy (Волгодонской)
    - with 7 selsovets under the district's jurisdiction.
  - Yegorlyksky (Егорлыкский)
    - with 9 selsovets under the district's jurisdiction.
  - Zavetinsky (Заветинский)
    - with 9 selsovets under the district's jurisdiction.
  - Zernogradsky (Зерноградский)
    - Towns under the district's jurisdiction:
      - Zernograd (Зерноград)
    - with 8 selsovets under the district's jurisdiction.
  - Zimovnikovsky (Зимовниковский)
    - with 11 selsovets under the district's jurisdiction.
