= Gornenskoye Urban Settlement =

Gornenskoye Urban Settlement is the name of several municipal formations in Russia.

== Modern urban settlements ==
- Gornenskoye Urban Settlement, a municipal formation which the work settlement of Gorny in Solnechny District of Khabarovsk Krai is incorporated as
- Gornenskoye Urban Settlement, an administrative division and a municipal formation which the work settlement of Gorny and the settlement of Lesostep in Krasnosulinsky District of Rostov Oblast are incorporated as

== Historical urban settlements ==
- Gornenskoye Urban Settlement, a former municipal formation which the then-urban-type settlement of Gorny in Kirovsky District of Primorsky Krai was incorporated as before being demoted in status to that of a rural settlement effective December 2013
