= Semikarakorsky =

Semikarakarsky (masculine), Semikarakorskaya (feminine), or Semikarakorskoye (neuter) may refer to:

- Semikarakorsky District, a district in Rostov Oblast, Russia
- Semikarakorskoye Urban Settlement, an administrative division and a municipal formation which the town of Semikarakorsk in Semikarakorsky District of Rostov Oblast, Russia is incorporated as
- Semikarakorskaya, former name of Semikarakorsk, a town in Semikarakorsky District of Rostov Oblast, Russia
