= Sholokhovsky =

Sholokhovsky (masculine), Sholokhovskaya (feminine), or Sholokhovskoye (neuter) may refer to:

- Sholokhovsky District, a district of Rostov Oblast, Russia
- Sholokhovsky (urban-type settlement), an urban locality (a work settlement) in Rostov Oblast, Russia
