= Gukovo =

Town in Rostov Oblast, Russia

Gukovo Гуково
- Town
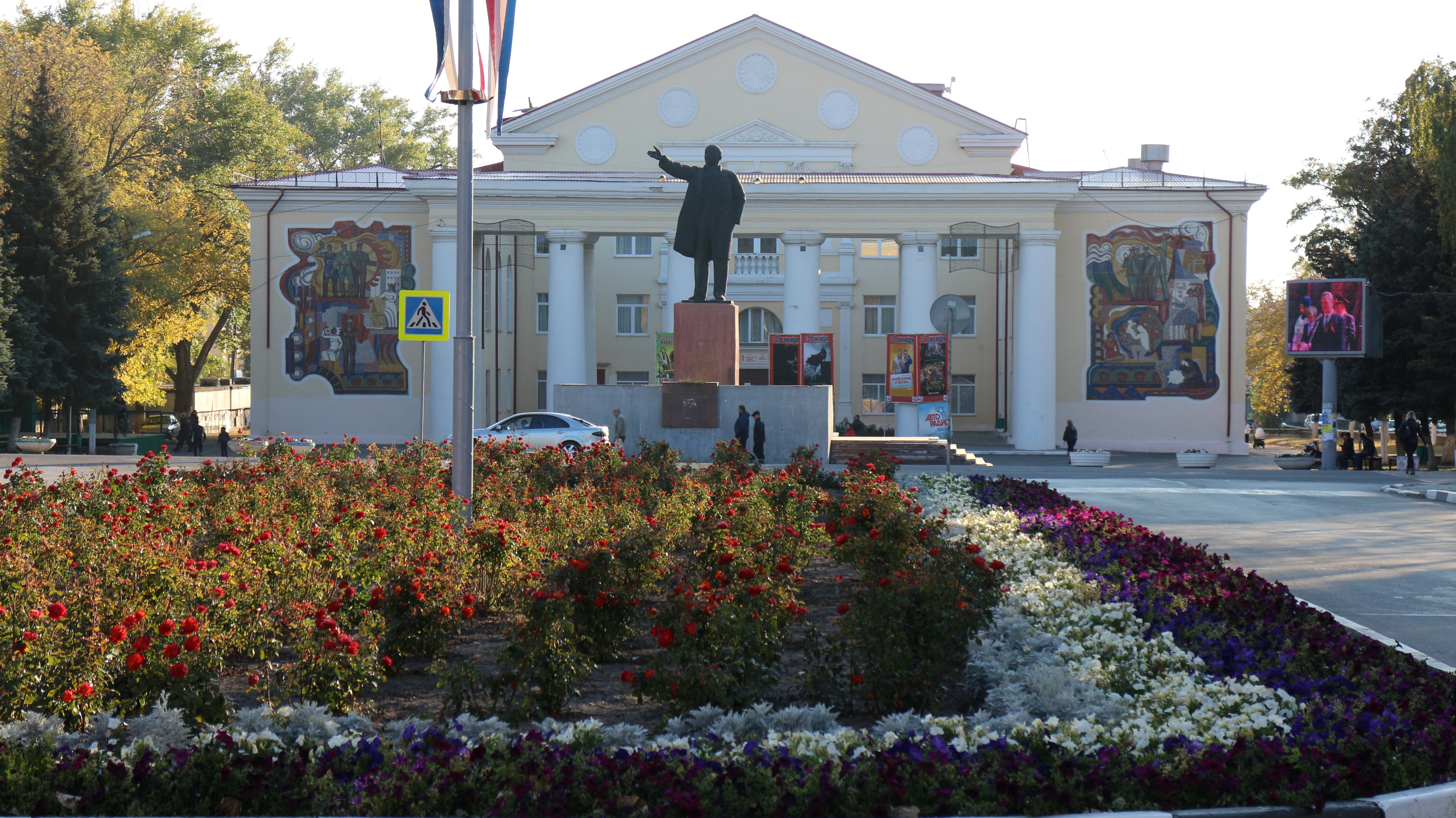
- Municipal Palace of Culture

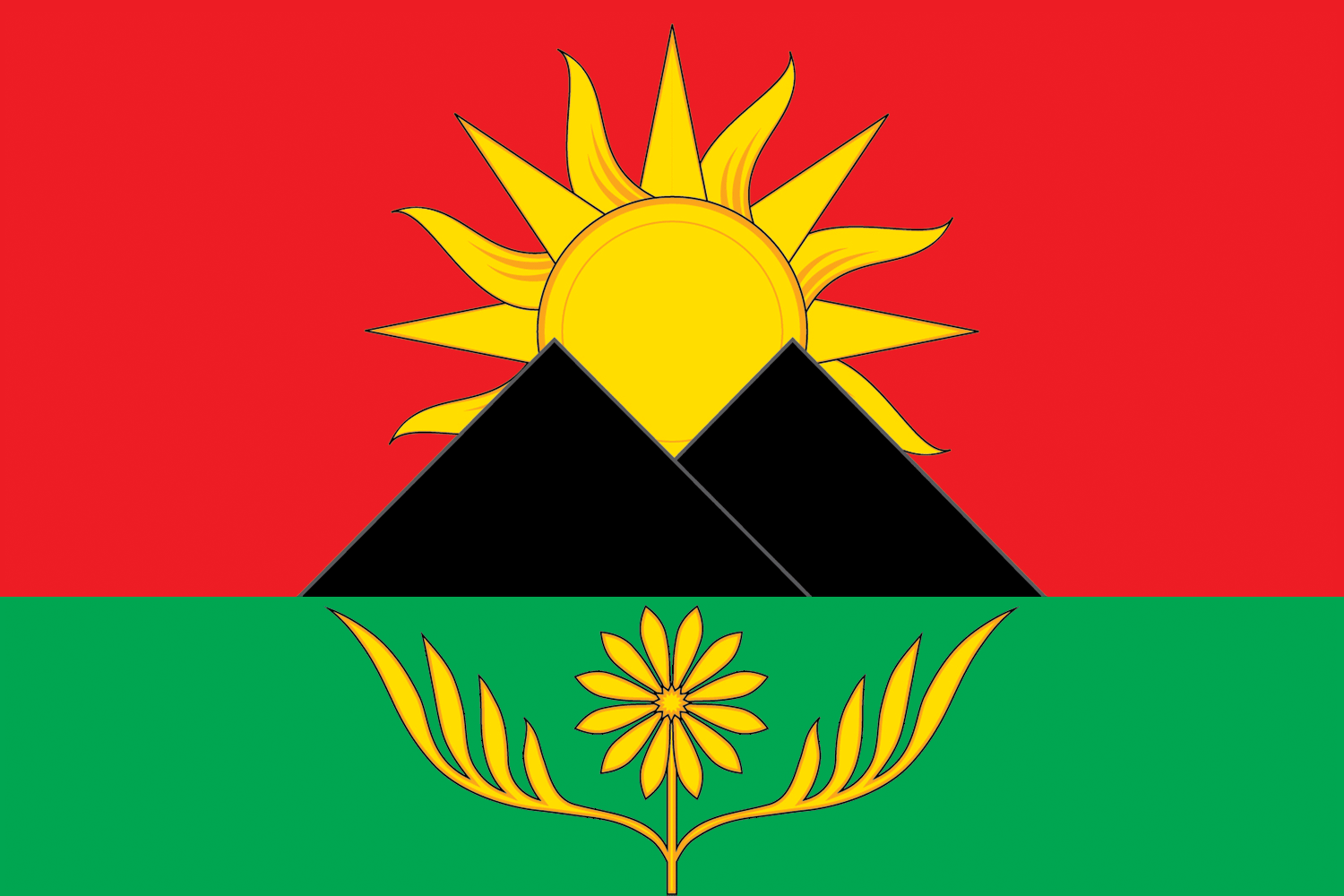
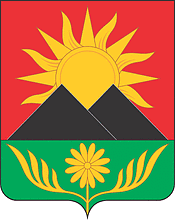
- Flag Coat of arms
- Interactive map of Gukovo
- Location of Gukovo Gukovo (European Russia) Gukovo (Russia)
- Coordinates: 48°03′N 39°55′E
- Country: Russia
- Federal subject: Rostov Oblast
- Founded: 1878
- Elevation: 260 m (850 ft)

Population (2010 Census)
  - Total: 67,278
  - Estimate (2025): 58,316 (−13.3%)
  - Rank: 230th in 2010

Administrative status
  - Subordinated to: Gukovo Urban Okrug
  - Capital of: Gukovo Urban Okrug

Municipal status
  - Urban okrug: Gukovo Urban Okrug
  - Capital of: Gukovo Urban Okrug
- Time zone: UTC+3 (MSK)
- Postal codes: 347870–347874, 347878–347881
- OKTMO ID: 60715000001
- Website: gukovo.donland.ru

Gukovo (Russian: Гу́ково) is a mining town in Rostov Oblast, Russia, located close to the border with Ukraine. Population: 66,648 (2002 census); 67,336 (1989 Soviet census).

== Geography ==
The city is located in the northwestern part of Rostov Oblast, occupies an area of 34.4 km^{2}, and consists of six separate neighborhoods (former mining settlements) that are several kilometers apart. The city is located at a short distance from the federal highway M4.

The territory of the city adjoins directly to the state border of the Russian Federation and Ukraine, there are railway and automobile international checkpoints.

== Administrative and municipal status ==
Within the framework of administrative divisions, it is incorporated as Gukovo Urban Okrug—an administrative unit with the status equal to that of the districts. As a municipal division, this administrative unit also has urban okrug status.

== History ==
=== Early history ===
The city of Gukovo was founded in the Provallia Steppe in 1878 as a railway station. It was further developed due to the presence of high quality anthracite coal reserves. Coal was mined here before the revolution of 1917.

In the early 19th century, in 1802, the land on which the city is located today, belonged to the Cossack centurion Gukov, who founded the khutor. However, the town was born in 1878, when a new railroad went through this territory, connecting Likhaya station with the center of Donetsk coal basin - Debaltsevo. The railway station, built on the future territory of the city, was originally called Kovalyovo, but in 1904 it was renamed Gukovo.

The settlement at the station grew at the expense of the population of nearby farms, who moved here to get work at the mines and mines that appeared here. The largest mine was owned by the Azov Coal Company. However, during the civil war, the economic development of the area was only stopped, and was only resumed at the end of the 1920s. Gukovo was administratively part of the Donets Governorate of Ukraine from 1920 to 1924. In 1927, coal mining was started in the Uglerod mine, and in 1929, the mine of the former Azov company was restored and named "Anthracite". In the thirties built several more mines, united in February 1939 in the trust "Gukovugol" combine "Rostovugol". In the villages started to appear relatively comfortable houses, schools, clubs, the first mechanized bakery was built.

=== World War II ===
German occupation of Gukovo lasted six months: from July 19, 1942 to February 14, 1943. A tragic page in the history of Gukovo was the mass execution of hundreds of disobedient residents in Kovalevsky stone quarry. In mining villages for the entire period of occupation there were underground resistance groups. After the victory in the Battle of Stalingrad on February 2, 1943 the Soviet troops moved westward, overcoming the resistance of the Nazis. The 5th Tank Army, which included the 47th Guards Division and the 321st Infantry Division, entered Gukovo, Zverevo, Likhaya and Krasny Sulin in the offensive zone. On February 14 regiments of the 321st division liberated settlements of Svetly, Uglerod, Zamchalovo and Zapovedny. The next day Gukovo was completely liberated from German Nazi invaders.

=== Recent history ===
Afterwards, a rapid reconstruction of mines and settlements at them began. In 1948 the trust "Gukovugol" was awarded the Order of the Red Banner of Labor for its success. Gradually the settlements began to grow and merged into the city with a new center, built on an empty place.

On June 30, 1955 Gukovo township (since 1939) was transformed into a city of regional subordination. At that time "Gukovshakhtostroy" trust was founded, active construction of both industrial objects, and housing and cultural institutions was started. In a young town a large palace of culture was built, a construction college and a vocational school were opened. There was a growth of new mines, including the largest in the region mine "Obukhovskaya-Zapadnaya. In 1970 on the basis of the trust "Gukovugol" was formed an independent plant, which also absorbed the mining enterprises of the neighboring city of Donetsk.

Today in Gukovo there are several food and light industry enterprises, as well as a brick factory and an engineering plant. The appearance of the city has changed considerably, several modern neighborhoods have been built here. There are two palaces of culture, a regional museum of local lore (museum of miners' work, the first in Russia and the only in the European part of Russia). There are modern hospitals, dispensaries, two stadiums, the Sports Palace with a swimming pool and several gymnasiums.

Highways connect Gukovo with neighboring cities such as Novoshakhtinsk, Shakhty, Zverev, Krasnoe Sulin, as well as cities in neighboring Ukraine. There is also an international road border crossing to Ukraine.

== Population ==
After the collapse of the Soviet Union and the ensuing economic crisis that led to the closure of many enterprises of extractive industries, the city's population declined slightly. Throughout the 1990s, it remained stable, but starting in the 2010s, it gradually began to decline as city residents moved to the regional center of Rostov-on-Don.

1939	1959	1962	1967	1970	1973	1976	1979	1982	1986	1987	1989
8800	↗52 969	↗59 000	↗68 000	↘65 105	↗68 000	↘67 000	↗68 080	↗70 000	↗72 000	→72 000	↘67 336
1992	1996	2000	2001	2002	2003	2005	2006	2007	2008	2009	2010
↗69 100	↗69 400	↘66 700	↘66 200	↗66 648	↘66 600	↗69 200	↘68 600	↘68 300	→68 300	↘67 998	↘67 278
2011	2012	2013	2014	2015	2016	2017	2018	2019	2020	2021	
↘67 103	↘66 327	↘65 775	↘65 264	↗65 336	↗65 713	↗66 332	↘64 869	↘63 771	↘63 150	↘60 361	

== Economic ==
The main branch of the city's economy for more than 80 years was the coal mining industry; in Soviet times, the city operated six mines. At the present time only the mine "Rostovskaya" is working. A sharp decline in industry had a negative impact on the economic situation in the city. In 2010, Gukovo was included in the list of monotowns, which were given priority assistance from the federal budget; as a result of efforts to reorient the local economy by 2019, 800 new jobs were created in a number of newly created agricultural, processing and recycling industries.

However, the problem of the shortage of jobs has not been completely solved, forcing some of the able-bodied local population to migrate to other regions of Russia, as well as to the regional center, the city of Rostov-on-Don.

=== Banking sector ===
Branches of a number of commercial banks have been operating in Gukovo since the early 1990s. In the period from 1999 to 2010 in the city operated "Donskoy Narodny Bank" - the only commercial bank, which had a legal address and head office in Gukovo.

The history of this bank dates back to 1994, when on the insolvency of the Moscow branch "Geolbank", from the Gukovo branch Geolbank was immediately transferred to the newly opened Gukovo branch of "Rostovsotsbank", where depositors' savings and account balances of city organizations were transferred.

At the beginning of 1998 due to the insolvency of the Head office Rostovsotsbank the heads of Gukovsky branch Leonid Shafirov (later - an honorary citizen of Gukovo) and Ludmila Klochko with the help of Gukovo management and JSC "Gukovugol" invited depositors and other customers to get their savings, and also sold assets and asked the borrowers to repay their loans. This made it possible to save the funds of all customers of the Gukovo branch of Rostovsotsbank. In 1999 former employees of the Gukov branch of "Rostovsotsbank" became founders, managers and other employees of the "Donskoy Narodny Bank" which in 2002 became a branch of the Moscow subsidiary of the Hungarian OTP-Bank.

== Transport ==
On the territory of the municipality is a railway station Gukovo Rostov region of the North Caucasus Railway. Freight trains pass through the station. Shunting operations are performed at the station. Passenger trains have not passed through the town since May 25, 2013.

There is a bus station in the city of Gukovo. Intercity bus routes link Gukovo with cities in the Rostov Oblast, Krasnodar Krai and Moscow.

== Infrastructure ==
In the city of Gukovo is one institution of higher education - Gukovo Institute of Economics and Law (regional branch of the Rostov State Economic University). Two colleges prepare specialists in the field of construction and energy. More than ten secondary schools, three art schools.

More than twenty kindergartens and nurseries.

== Culture ==
In the city there is the only in the European part of Russia Gukovsky Museum of Miners' Labor. The museum was founded in 1964 as a local history museum, at the beginning of the 21 century it began to develop intensively as a mining museum. After moving to a new building on Kovalev Street, 49, in the museum appeared a complex of rooms "Mine", which presents mining workings in full size, panoramas of pre-revolutionary mines, mining machinery and equipment. Currently, the museum's collection consists of more than 23,000 items.

The oldest church in the city is St. Nicholas' Church, built in 1887. The temple, unlike many others that were destroyed by Soviet orders or during combat operations, survived both the Revolution and the Civil War and World War II. In 1978-1986 the church was reconstructed and greatly expanded. A new foundation was dug and the walls were bricked up. In 1992, a new painting of the interior walls of the temple was completed.

== Sports ==
The city of Gukovo is famous for the fact that in its vicinity for a long time a stage of the Russian Rally Championship with the same name was held. The competition was held on a cross-country track called "Berezki", which was the only one in the city.

In October 2016 there was a grand opening of the new cross-country track "Gukovskaya", which is located in the vicinity of khutor Kalinov. This track is presented for the stages of the Russian Rally Championship and local regional competitions.

== Honorary citizens of the city ==
- Vasily Alekseyev
- Leonid Shafirov
