= Krasnosulinsky =

Krasnosulinsky (masculine), Krasnosulinskaya (feminine), or Krasnosulinskoye (neuter) may refer to:

- Krasnosulinsky District, a district of Rostov Oblast, Russia
- Krasnosulinskoye Urban Settlement, an administrative division and a municipal formation which the town of Krasny Sulin in Krasnosulinsky District of Rostov Oblast, Russia is incorporated as
