= Leonid Shafirov =

Russian entrepreneur (born 1973)

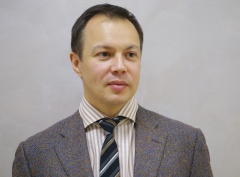
- Born: May 7, 1973 (age 53); Chita, USSR
- Education: Moscow State Mining University, University of St. Gallen, Skema Business School
- Occupation: financier
- Known for: Banker, Ph.D

Leonid Alexandrovich Shafirov (Russian: Леонид Александрович Шафиров; born May 7, 1973) is an entrepreneur, financier, scientist, PhD

In the 1990s – twice, despite the insolvency of the head offices of the banks – he ensured the return of funds to all clients of the branches he headed. In 1998 – as acting chairman of the board of the insolvent Rostovsocbank, he ensured the return of savings to all individual depositors of that bank. From 1999 until 2008 - a chairman of the board of directors of the Donskoy Narodny Bank. The magazine Bankovskoye Obozreniye included Leonid Shafirov in the top five most successful Russian bankers in 2007.

Shafirov left the banking sector in 2008.

After leaving the banking sector, Shafirov pursued and successfully earned his master's and Ph.D. degrees from European and Canadian universities.

Sphere of scientific interests - self-build housing, consumer lending, management of household projects and portfolios of household projects at the municipal level, the social efficiency of lending to the individuals, and economic and financial literacy as factors of socio-economic development.

== Biography ==
He was born in 1973 in Chita to a family of medical practitioners. He spent his childhood in the town of Gukovo. In 1990, he graduated with a gold medal from Gukovo Secondary School No. 5. During his studies at school, he was elected chairman of the student committee - at the age of 13. He was a young correspondent for the city and regional newspapers and city radio and a member of the TV program "Image" (currently called "Brainiacs") of the Soviet Central Television. Later, as head of the bank, he initiated and hosted the intellectual TV quiz for schoolchildren of the Rostov region "Erudite of the Don" on the regional TV channel Don-TR. Filming took place in Gukovo, Rostov-on-Don, Novoshakhtinsk, Novocherkassk, Taganrog, Shakhty, Azov and Krasny Sulin.

He graduated with honors from the Moscow Mining Institute in 1993 with a degree in mining industry. In 1999, he defended his dissertation and received a PhD in sociology. In 2012 he defended his Master's thesis on Financial Services and Insurance in a joint program of the University of St. Gallen, Vlerick Business School and HSE University. In 2017, he completed his PhD at Skema Business School under the supervision of Professors Rodney Turner and Hiroshi Tanaka and received a Philosophy Doctor degree in Project Management and Strategic Management. Author of more than 20 scientific articles.

He started entrepreneurial activity at eighteen, organized seminars on accounting and taxation, in trade and purchase of industrial goods produced at the Moscow and Moscow region factories. He began his employee career in 1991 at the Gukovugol Production Association as a representative of the Procurement Department in Moscow. In 1993 he was appointed deputy director of the Gukovo branch of Geolobank (Moscow). To decrease social tension and non-payments in favor of clients - employees of coal-mining enterprises he suggested organizing of labor dispute commissions at trade-union committees for priority payments of wage claims in case of insufficient funds on employers' banking accounts. During the Non-payment crisis in Russia he initiated the issue of the promissory notes by JSC Gukovugol, JSC Obukhovskaya and JSC Rostovshakhtostroy.

In 1994, together with the team of the Gukovo branch of Geolbank, despite the insolvency of the head office of Geolbank in Moscow, he ensured the safety of funds of all - more than 5000 clients of the bank branch by promptly transferring liabilities to the newly established branch of Rostovsocbank, which he headed. In 1998, when Rostovsotsbank's Head Office became insolvent, and the safety of customers' funds was at risk, he virtually liquidated the Gukovo branch of Rostovsoсbank that he headed, inviting all the customers (over 25,000 people and organizations) to receive the funds entrusted to the branch. The Gukovo branch of Rostovsotsbank returned all savings and account balances to clients within a few weeks. Because of this self-activity, he was forced to take a position of Acting Chairman of the Board of the insolvent OJSC Rostovsotsbank (Rostov-on-Don), the first commercial bank in the South of Russian Federation. During 1998–1999, Shafirov with the support of the bank's staff without introducing the provisional administration of the Central Bank of the Russian Federation, without financial support from the state and shareholders, carried out work on the recovery of problem loans, sale of assets, as a result providing the return of savings to all depositors - individuals in Rostov-on-Don, Taganrog, Shakhty, Donetsk (more than 150,000 depositors).

During 1999–2008, he was the chairman of the board of directors of the Donskoy Narodny Bank (Gukovo). Shafirov contributed to the development of the bank to such an extent that the bank, which had been following in the 1998 year its financial rehabilitation plan, became a promising target for foreign investment, and in 2007 it joined the Hungarian OTP banking group. During this period, the bank increased its network 40 times, from a small bank in a mining town turned into one of the largest banks in the South of Russia. The Donskoy Narodny Bank was the first bank in the Rostov region to grant loans to owners of private subsidiary plots, became one of the first in the Rostov region to grant mortgages, and was one of the first regional banks to become a member of the state deposit insurance system.

From 2008 – continued his entrepreneurial, investing and civic activities. In 2015 – a member of the Public Chamber of the Rostov Region. From 2016 until 2022 – a member of the Public Chamber of the Russian Federation. Leonid Shafirov is the initiator and organizer of sociological research and expert discussions on the issues of self-build housing construction, gasification of housing, improvement of the order of formation and activities of municipal public chambers (councils), state economic policy on the recovery of single-industry towns and development of territories, vocational guidance, development of cross-border cooperation and activation of twin cities relations.

On the initiative of Shafirov, large-scale international actions were realized:

- «Discover Russia» international educational project - over 10,000 participants. As a result, more than 24,400 encyclopedic articles and over 104,000 images were published about the sights, cultural heritage sites and prominent people and educational films dedicated to famous writers and musical clips about the sights, history and cultural heritage of Russia's regions were created and published, as well as aimed at promoting intercultural relations between the world and the twin cities movement;
- International Literary Festival and the First International Congress of Volunteers of Culture and Media, the participants of which were citizens of 10 countries, the Second International Congress of Volunteers of Culture, Media and Cultural Tourism, in the creative competitions which were attended by over 1700 volunteers from 28 countries;
- All-Russian contest «Discover Russia. Entrepreneurs are fellow countrymen» - more than 700 participants; as a result, the experience of more than 600 entrepreneurs was studied and popularized;
- Сampaign «My Childhood is War» - more than 8,000 participants; as a result, a bank of video memories of more than 3,000 people - war children were created, 2,933 encyclopedia articles about war children were published in Wikipedia, finalized and published. As a result of the campaign, proposals for additional measures of social support for war children were summarized and sent to the authorities; relevant regional laws were adopted;
- The Сampaign «Good Garden» to develop agrovolunteering - as a result, agrovolunteer groups assisting socially vulnerable citizens in carrying out their gardening and gardening work are operating.

Shafirov was a head of the organizing committee of district contests of municipal public chambers and councils in the Northwestern, Far Eastern, Urals, and Southern Federal Districts.

Married. Raises two sons.

== Honors and titles ==
- Honorary citizen of the city of Gukovo
- Winner of the Free Knowledge award (2014, 2020) of Wikimedia
- Medal 100th anniversary of M.A. Sholokhov (2005)
- Medal For Valorous Labor for the Good of the Don Region (2019)
