= The Long Canyon =

Submerged quarry in Russia

The Long canyon (quarry)
- Russian: Длинный каньон (карьер)
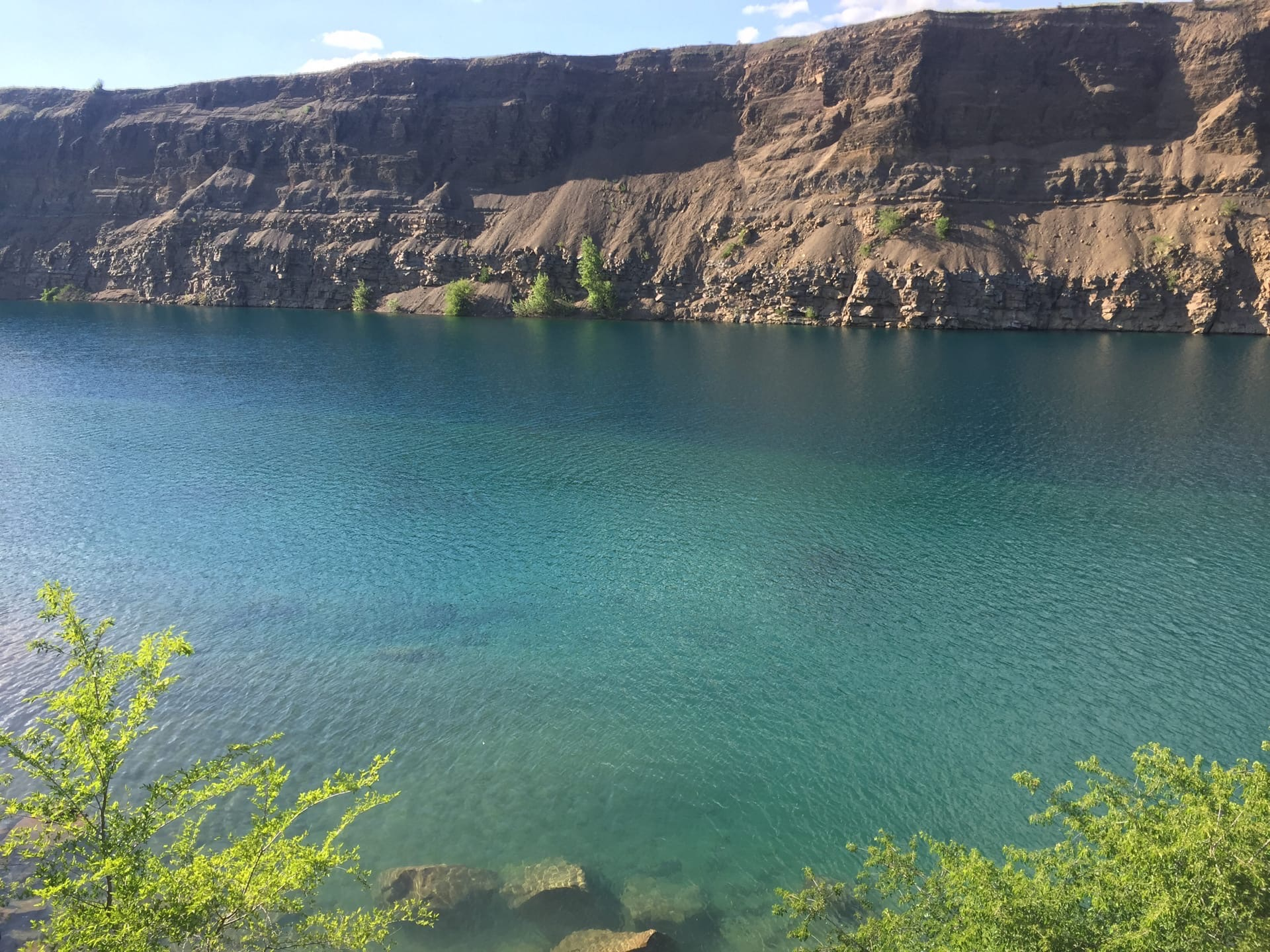

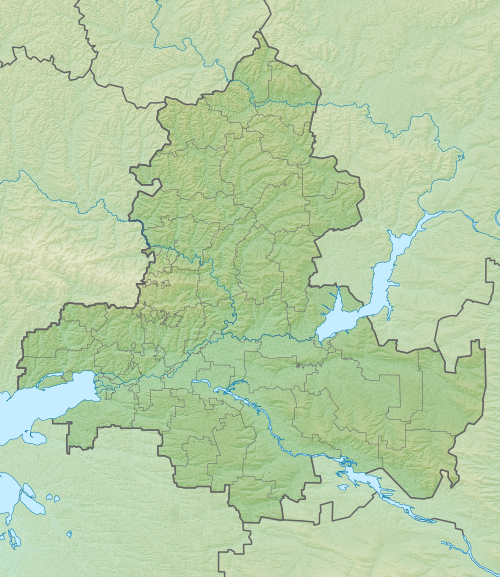
- Location within Rostov Oblast Location within European Russia
- Length: 2 km (1.2 mi)
- Width: 01 km (0.62 mi)
- Depth: 50m

Geography
- Location: Rostov oblast Russia
- Coordinates: 48.23°N 40.34°E
- Interactive map of The Long canyon (quarry)

The Long Canyon is a submerged quarry located in the Kamensky district of the Rostov Oblast in Russia.

== History ==
The Long Canyon originated as the site of a stone quarry. In the 1970s, work performed by an excavator, caused an unexpected rupture of the water table. This resulted in the quarry flooding so quickly that the work crew was unable to retrieve their equipment, abandoning it to the water.

== Description ==
Now the site of a 2.2 kilometres (1.4 mi) long lake, the Long Canyon is considered to be the largest submerged quarry in the Rostov region. The quarry is located 6 kilometres (3.7 mi) south-west of the village Chistoozerny and 10 kilometres (6.2 mi) south-east of Kamensk-Shakhtinsky. The lake is about 100 metres (330 ft) wide at its broadest point, and 30–50 meters (98–164 ft) deep. Its banks are 40 metres (130 ft) high, rocky and steep. The lake is fed by underground streams, and its water remains cold regardless of air temperature.
