= Kostin House =

Building in Rostov-on-Don, Russia

Coordinates: 47°13′29.1″N 39°43′23.6″E

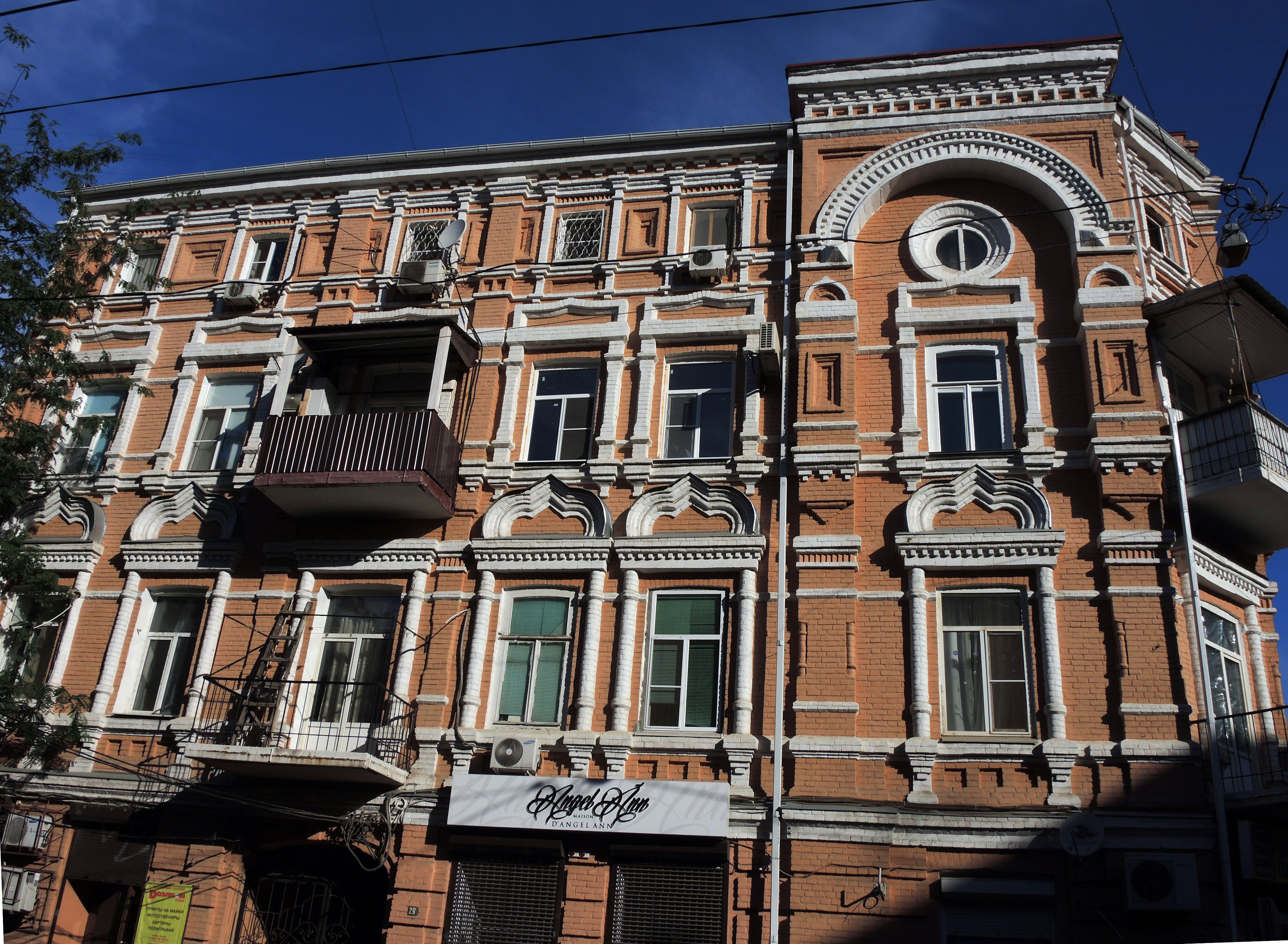
Kostin House

The Kostin House (Russian: Дом Костина, romanized: Dom Kostina) is a building in the Kirovsky District of Rostov-on-Don, Russia. The house is located at 37 Chekhov Prospekt at the intersection of Chekhov Prospekt (formerly Maly Lane) and Suvorov Street (formerly Malaya Sadovaya Street). The Kostin House has the status of an object of cultural heritage of regional significance.

== History ==
The building was erected in the late 19th century as a revenue house. Its owners were the Rostov merchant Yefim Yakovlevich Kostin and his wife Domna Ivanovna Kostina. They also owned an oil mill in a building next to the Kostin House. By resolution № 411 of the Rostov Oblast Administration on 9 October 1998 the house was designated an object of cultural heritage of regional significance. In the 2000s the building was restored. The ground floor is currently occupied by shops and a restaurant.

== Description ==
The Kostin House was built in the Russian Revival style. The facade is rusticated, and decorated with lesenes, horizontal cornices above rectangular windows and a blind arch above the only round window. A cornice above small corbels crowns the top of the building.
