= Lyakhmayer House =

Building in the Kirovsky District of Rostov-on-Don, Russia

Coordinates: 47°13′0.8″N 39°43′14″E

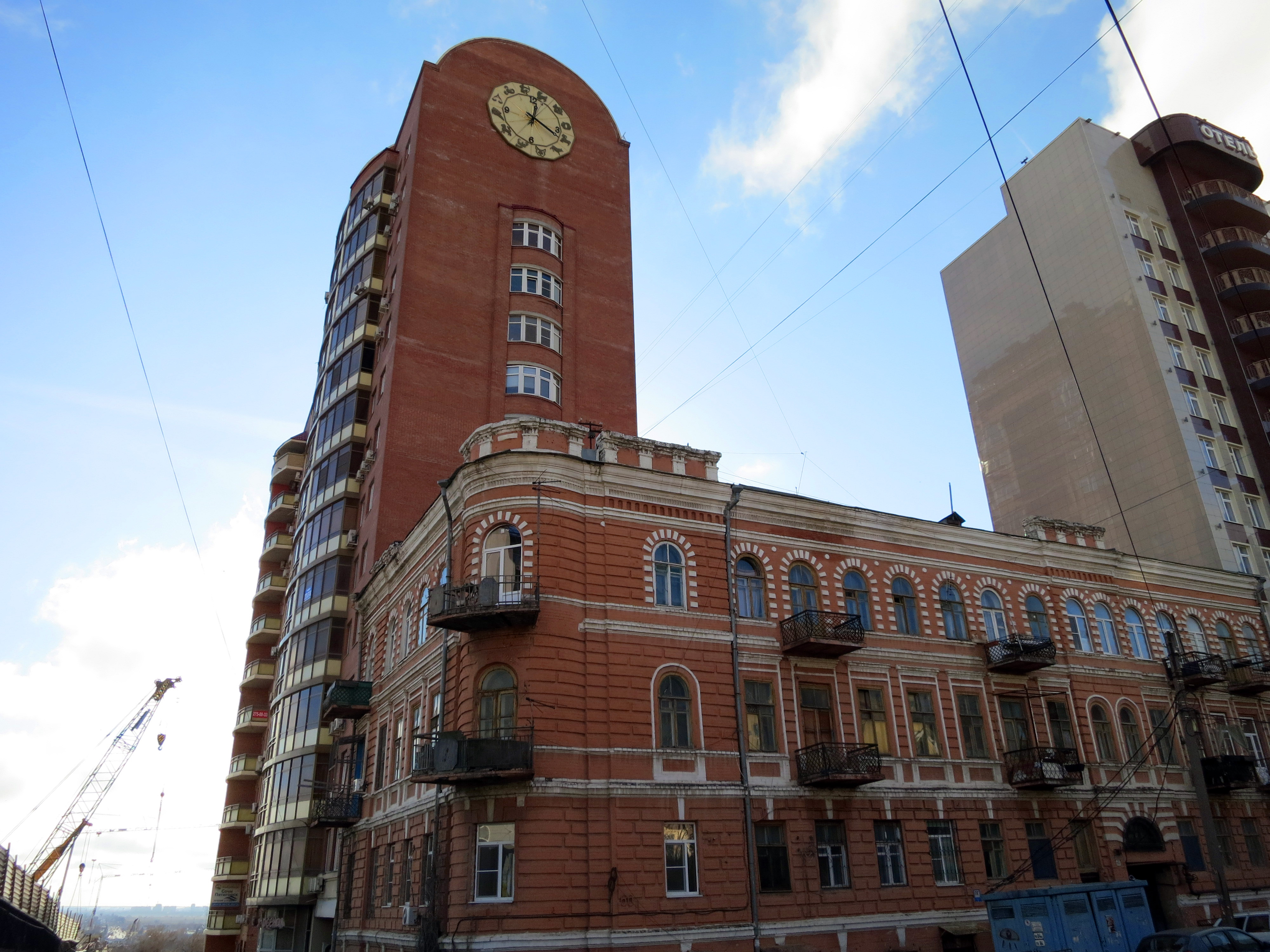
Lyakhmayer House

The Lyakhmayer House (Russian: Дом Ляхмаер, romanized: Dom Lyakhmayer) is a building in the Kirovsky District of Rostov-on-Don, Russia. The house is located at 60/1 Ulyanovskaya Street, at its intersection with Voroshilovsky Prospekt. Originally built as a revenue house, the building has the status of an object of cultural heritage of regional significance.

== History ==
The Lyakhmayer House was built in the late 19th century. The first owner was Yekaterina Petrovna Lyakhmayer, who also owned a plot of land on Kankrinskaya Street. In July 1900 the sanitary committee declared that the house fell below the required sanitary-hygienic conditions, and indicated that it would be closed and its residents be required to move elsewhere. This measure was ultimately not carried out, but the building was cleaned and the owner given a fine of 15 rubles, and made to pay another 40 rubles to cover cleaning costs. The annual profit from the house was 1,030 rubles. Lyakhmayer's personal lawyer, Abram Lazarevich Chernikov, sold the building to the landowner Anna Yashchenkova for 30 thousand rubles. Yashchenkova then mortgaged the house back to Chernikov and the merchant Tokarev. Chernikov became the owner of the Lyakhmayer House in 1910. By resolution № 411 of the Rostov Oblast Administration on 9 October 1998 the house was designated an object of cultural heritage of regional significance.

== Description ==
The three-storey building was designed in the late 19th century. Architecture of the building employs baroque and classic elements of decoration. The facade is decorated with attic and banded rustications with smooth-faced "V" joints and vermiculated square blocks. Second-floor rectangular windows are crowned with Labels. The second and third floors have small balconies with delicate iron-cast railing.
