= Church of the Intercession, Krasny Sulin =

Church in Rostov Oblast, Russia

Coordinates: 47.8881°N 40.0883°E

Church of the Intercession
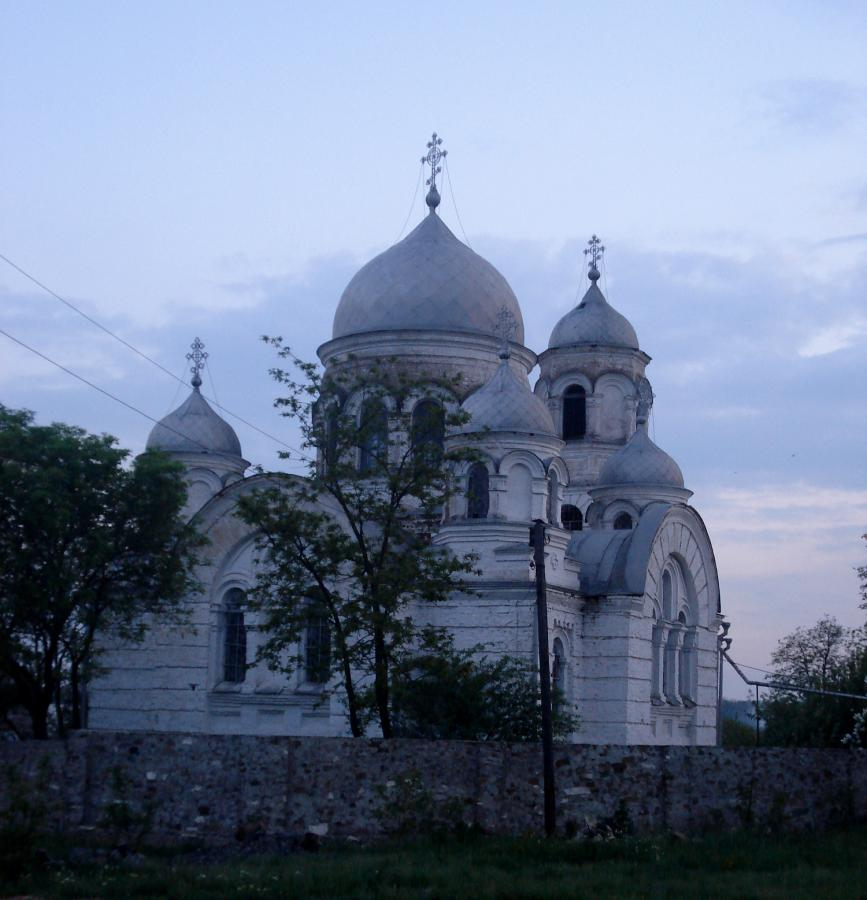

Religion
- Affiliation: Russian Orthodox

Location
- Location: Krasny Sulin, Rostov Oblast Russia
- Interactive map of Church of the Intercession

Architecture
- Completed: 1914

Church of the Intercession (Russian: Свято-Покровский храм) ― the only one of three Orthodox churches (there were also St. Andrew's Church in the village of Sulin and St. Alexander Nevsky's Church) that has still been preserved until our days in the town of Krasny Sulin, Rostov Oblast, Russia. Its architecture resembles that of Novocherkassk Cathedral, but is much smaller in size. Church of the Intercession is a five-domed church with largest of them being at the centre. There is also a three-tiered bell tower at the church territory.

== History ==
Church of the Intercession was founded in Sulinovsko-Kundrjuchensky khutor (present-day Kazachy village) in 1911. Its architect is unknown, but historians found out that many such churches were built on the Don land on projects of the famous architect Peter Semenovich Studenikin. The construction began in 1912, and was conducted under the supervision of ataman and honorary citizen Alexander Ivanovich Polyakov. First church building was erected at the expense of khutor community, and in 1913 the khutor administration allocated funds in the amount of 29,000 rubles for the completion of construction works and purchase of all the necessary accessories for clergy. In 1914, construction was finally completed.

On December 10, 1914, the church was consecrated by Archbishop of Don and Novocherkassk Vladimir (Putyata).

Church of the Intercession survived the October Revolution. Services were held there until its closure in 1935, and was opened only under the German occupation during World War II. Here was sent a priest ― a Greek who belonged to the Patriarchate of Constantinople. The occupation authorities have tried to bring disunity to the Russian Orthodox Church, and, in this regard tried to pick up clergymen that didn't have any ties with Moscow. After the liberation of the town, services at the temple for some time had not been carried out, and resumed only in 1946, after the new appointment of a priest, and have not stopped until then.

In 1980 the churched was redecorated. On January 15, 1981, the temple was recognized as a monument of history and culture of the USSR. After the collapse of the Soviet Union, on the decision of the Regional Council of December 17, 1992, the church was declared a monument of history and culture of the Russian Federation.

In 2003, on the territory of the temple there was established a Sunday school. In 2010 in church began another great-scale restoration works.

== Sources ==
- Донские Епархиальные Ведомости от 11 декабря 1914 г.
- Кудрявцев В. В. «Страницы прошлого листая», стр. 20–21.
- ГАРО. Ф.р-4173. Оп.6. Д.52
