= Donskoy Narodny Bank =

Bank of Russia

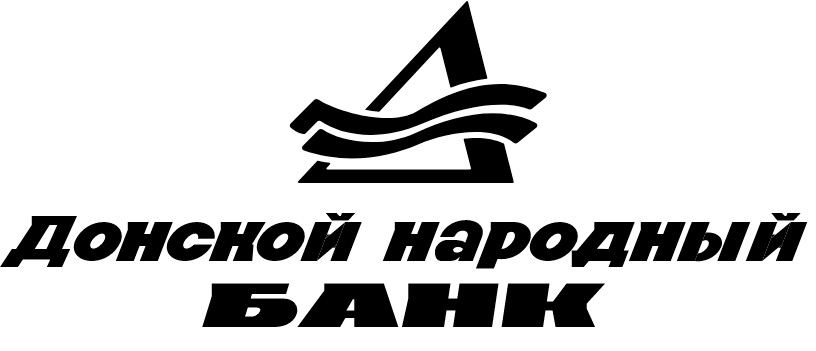
- Native name: Донской народный банк
- Type: Closed Joint Stock Company
- Industry: Financial services
- Founded: 1992
- Defunct: 2010
- Fate: Acquired
- Successor: Rostov branch of OTP Bank
- Headquarters: Gukovo / Rostov-on-Don, Russia
- Area served: Russia
- Services: Banking services

Donskoy Narodny Bank (DNB; lit. 'Don People’s Bank') (Russian: Донской народный банк) was a Russian commercial bank that operated from 1992 until it was acquired by the Hungarian OTP Bank in 2007.

It was founded in 1992 as the Stanichny (Village) Commercial Bank (SCB) "Yegorlyk". Until 1998, it carried out its activities on the territory of Yegorlyksky District in Rostov Oblast. At the end of 1998, SCB “Yegorlyk” experienced financial difficulties and practically ceased operations. And after that, the Bank was acquired by new owners, among whom were the former employees and clients of the Gukovo branch of Rostovsocbank, which made a full refund to all clients and depositors in early 1998, despite the insolvency of the Rostovsocbank’s head office.

In 1999, SCB was renamed “Donskoy Narodny Bank,” which became one of the largest retail banks in Southern Russia in the 2000s, carrying out innovative operations (for that period) in retail lending and securities. The Bank also participated in social projects, including the TV-show “Erudite of the Don”. The bank had 41 branches and 10 cash desks. From 1999–2008, the Bank’s Chairman of the Board of Directors was Leonid Shafirov, the financier. During this period, the Chairman of the Executive Board was Lyudmila Klochko, who Alexei Bobkin later replaced.

In 2007, the Bank was taken over by the Hungarian OTP Group, and in 2010, it merged with OTP Bank as Rostov Branch.

== History ==
The Bank was founded in 1992.The same year, it received a banking license from the Central Bank of Russia. Until 1999, it mainly granted loans and provided settlement and cash services to farmers and agricultural organizations in Yegorlyksky District. At the end of 1998, former employees and clients of the Gukovsky branch of Rostovsocbank acquired a 100% stake in the authorized capital of the loss-making SCB “Yegorlyk,” which was later renamed to “Donskoy Narodny Bank.” The logo has changed. The head office of the Bank was relocated to the town Gukovo.

In the first years of its activity, the Bank attracted significant funds as savings from individuals – depositors who provided the Bank. It was possible because the employees of the “Donskoy Narodny Bank,” who previously worked at the Gukovo branches of Geolbank and Rostovsocbank, in 1994 and 1998, respectively, provided a full return of funds to individuals – depositors of these branches.

The phenomenon of the “Donskoy Narodny Bank,” based on close ties with local communities, has been studied by scientists and museum workers. In particular, candidate of economic sciences Yu. S. Ezrokh noted: “Why did this Bank succeed and hundreds of others didn’t? The big advantage of a regional bank, and more broadly, a bank in which decisions are made mainly by shareholders involved in management, is autonomy in decision-making: what rates to set on deposits, on loans, to whom to issue money, etc. Of course, this is impossible in most bank branches, as well as for many banks with many decision-making centres.”

“Donskoy Narodny Bank” served most of the settlement accounts of coal mining and coal processing enterprises of the Rostov Oblast.

Bank, despite significant credit risks, provided loans to these organizations and their employees and local administrations of mining cities and regions of the Don. To improve the financial literacy of the population, offline and television meetings of citizens with the management of the Bank and its divisions were held regularly.

In 1998, the bank opened its first branch in Rostov-on-Don. In 2000, DNB received a license to operate in the stock market for brokerage and dealer activities.

In 1999, the Bank agreed with the Central Bank on the methodology for assessing borrowers according to individual indicators without analyzing financial statements and tax returns; this innovation concerning lending to individual subsidiary plots and farms. When issuing loans, the Bank used as creditworthiness indicators the size of farmland and household plots, productivity and reviews of fellow compatriots about potential borrowers.“Donskoy Narodny Bank” introduced some innovative services: new types of deposit products, including those with hedging of currency risks, overdrafts to the accounts of individuals and entrepreneurs, loans for the development of personal subsidiary plots, gasification and housing construction.

In 2002, after the Russian Government decided on the possibility of placing the funded part of the pension in non-state pension funds, “Donskoy Narodny Bank” became the founder of the Don People’s Pension Fund.

By 2006, DNB ranked 122 among Russian banks in the volume of consumer and mortgage loans. According to the results of 2006, the Bank became the regional market leader for equity securities. The total volume of transactions of the Bank’s clients and the Bank with equity securities amounted to 4,479 million roubles.

At the end of 2006, the Russian Moody’s Interfax Rating Agency assigned “Donskoy Narodny Bank”, a long-term national scale credit rating of Ba2.ru.

DNB participated in the implementation of many regional social projects. In particular, DNB was a sponsor and, together with the All-Russian State Television and Radio Broadcasting Company “Don-TR,” co-organized the TV project “Erudite of the Don,” dedicated to the sights of the Rostov Oblast. Such social projects as “Voters Choose the Best,” “Don People’s Bank for the Cleanliness of the City,” “Train of the Future,” “Day of the Excellent Student” and others were implemented with the support of the Bank. In 2003 and 2008, residents of towns Gukovo and Zverevo, Krasnosulinsky District, elected the Chairman of the Board of the Bank, Leonid Shafirov, as their representative in the Legislative Assembly of Rostov region; in 2008, Shafirov was elected an honorary citizen of the town Gukovo.

With the expansion of the banking network, limited access to credit resources began to slow down the further development of the Bank. It created an obstacle to continuing high growth rates and led to the need to find a strategic investor. In 2008, “Donskoy Narodny Bank” became part of the Hungarian banking OTP Group. By that time, depositors entrusted the Bank with savings of 1.9 billion roubles; DNB provided loans to individuals of more than 1.3 billion roubles. According to the results of 2009, the Bank took 3rd place in the rating of banks in the Rostov Oblast in terms of the volume of private deposits.

In February 2010, “Donskoy Narodny Bank” ceased operations due to the merger with OTP Bank. Based on the DNB, the Rostov branch of OTP Bank was created, with its head office in Gukovo.
