= Rostovsocbank =

Dissolved Russian commercial bank

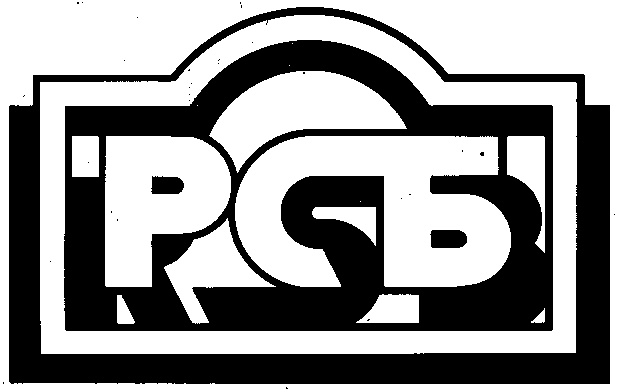
- Native name: Ростовсоцбанк
- Industry: Finance
- Founded: 1989
- Defunct: 1998
- Headquarters: Rostov-on-Don, Russia
- Area served: Russia
- Services: Banking

Rostovsocbank (Russian: Ростовсоцбанк) was a Russian commercial bank. It was established in 1989 and registered by the Central Bank of Russia in October 1990. The first commercial bank in the south of Russia was founded as a result of the commercialisation of the Rostov office of the USSR Zhilsocbank. In the 1990s, it used to be a major bank in the Rostov region with several branches in Rostov-on-Don and other cities such as Taganrog, Shakhty, Gukovo, and Donetsk.

Ivan Savvidi, a well-known entrepreneur, was Chairman of the board of directors in 1997 and 1998. In 1998, in the time of deep crisis for Rostovsocbank — this position of Chairman of Bank Management Board was filled by financier Leonid Shafirov - up to the moment of bank charter revocation. Rostovsocbank ceased to exist in 1998.

The Gukovo branch of Rostovsocbank twice (in 1994 and 1998) saved the bank deposits of Gukovo citizens (Rostov region) and funds of local organisations.The whole Rostovsocbank managed to make full deposit returns to all individuals even before the System of Deposit Insurance was established.

Rostovsocbank had paid back all deposits to the private clients before its bank charter revocation.

In 1999 a group of Rostovsocbank employees became founders, executives and other employees of Donskoy Narodny Bank, which was later integrated into OTP-Bank.

== History ==
Rostovsocbank was founded in October 1989 in Rostov-on-Don, and it was named Rostov Commercial Bank of Social Development — "Rostovsocbank".

In 1990 it received the charter of the Central Bank of the Russian Federation. In 1993 the bank became the founder of the National Independent Pension Fund. In 1994 in collaboration with regional banks "Doncombank", "Yugmebelbank", and "Center-invest", it created a consortium in the framework of which the banks issued promissory notes to solve the insolvency crisis which arose in the region and the country. The area of circulation of bank promissory notes was the Rostov region.

In 1994 due to the insolvency of Moscow "Geolbank", in just a few days, all deposits of all 5000 depositors and hundreds of accounts of different organisations were transferred from the Gukovo branch of "Geolbank" to the new-opened Gukovo branch of Rostovsocbank which Leonid Shafirov headed.

This procedure of transfer of assets and liabilities to a bridge bank was officially adopted by Central Bank only in 2009. Moreover, bridge banks received concessional financing. The salvation of the assets of Gukovo branch clients of "Geolbank" was carried out without the financial assistance of the Bank of Russia. At the same time, the Department of the Bank of Russia in the Rostov region provided organisational service in opening the Rostovsocbank branch in Gukovo.

This prompt transfer of all assets and liabilities of clients and investors from the Gukovo branch of Geolbank to the Gukovo branch of Rostovsocbank was carried out and clients’ consents for this transfer were collected after the transfer. However, it allowed avoiding asset seizure of Gukovo branch of Geolbank as debt settlement of Moscow Geolbank and rescue depositors' savings — of citizens of mining towns in Rostov region.

In 1995 Rostovsocbank initiated the creation of "Informbank" — an Independent Clearinghouse — which took over bank operations of some regional Russian banks. Moreover, the bank became the founder of Rostov Universal Bank, which was created for similar purposes. Implementation of financial transactions between banks in real time was relevant as the System of Rapid Electronic Bank Payments was established by the Bank of Russia only in 2007.

By 1997 assets of the Gukovo branch of Rostovsocbank had amounted to 1/3 of all assets of Rostovsocbank. In 1998 over 25000 depositors and organisations kept their savings and had settlement accounts in the Gukovo branch of Rostovsocbank. Among them, there were groups of miners and mine-builders: joint-stock companies "Gukovugol'", Shakhtugol", "Obukhovskoye", "Rostovshakhtostroy".

In mining areas of the Rostov region, where the level of financial accessibility was low, the Gukovo branch of Rostovsocbank began purchasing promissory notes of Gukovugol. It reduced the negative impact of the insolvency crisis. Gukovo branch provided loans to small businesses, the employees of the clients and self-employed citizens. Besides that Gukovo branch assisted in setting up the work of the Committee on Labour Disputes in client organisations, thus ensuring salary payment to miners, based on Committee data certificates as a matter of priority, before tax and other compulsory payments.

At the beginning of 1998, Rostovsocbank started having financial difficulties due to the growth of the share of overdue loans in loan portfolios of the Head office and some bank branches. There were some cases of non-payment of clients' bank transfer orders and problems with depositors' refunds.

Valentina Mikhailovna Yashkova, who had run the bank from its establishment, resigned from the CEO position. The management board of Rostovsocbank attempted to withdraw assets from the Gukovo branch with the intention of debt settlement for depositors and other clients in Rostov-on-Don because Rostov-on-Don was a more politically important city for the management and shareholders of Rostovsocbank.

Management of the Gukovo branch of Rostovsocbank — L.A. Shafirov and L.I. Klochko, — supported by the local court decision, did not implement the order of Rostovsocbank management to issue cash, securities and foreign currency from the branch's cash offices to the Head office representative. Conversely, with the assistance of Gukovo city council and joint-stock company "Gukovugol'" Shafirov and Klochko invited 27000 depositors and clients to immediately withdraw savings and funds kept in the branch as well as called on borrowers to pay off the loans as soon as possible. As a result, all clients of the Gukovo branch of Rostovsocbank — organisations and depositors got their money back in just three weeks.

A small group of the former Gukovo branch clients became members of a limited partnership. Gukovo branch sold the long-term loans and other investment assets to this partnership. The limited partnership employed ex-employees of the Gukovo branch of Rostovsocbank. Finally, the Gukovo branch of Rostovsocbank was closed.

In 1998 Leonid Shafirov was appointed as crisis manager of Rostovsocbank. He was commissioned to provide full settlement to depositors of Rostovsocbank. Collection of overdue loans and sale of assets allowed Rostovsocbank to refund deposits to all clients of all the other branches of Rostovsocbank in Rostov-on-Don (5 offices), Taganrog, Shakhty and Donetsk. It was executed for four months, even before the devaluation of August 1998. The major part of liabilities to legal entities was also paid back. It was funded by selling the bank's assets. Part of the liabilities to the legal entities was written off because these clients of Rostovsocbank submitted to the bank the payments orders to the budget. Rostovsocbank did not execute these orders. The Constitutional court of the Russian Federation later confirmed the possibility of considering unpaid clients' orders to the budget as paid.

PhD in economics Yu.S.Ezrokh, who researched this case of the salvation of savings of the bank's clients, pointed out: "Now we remember with a smile the stories of how the bank system was established and developed, of infringements that the banks committed. The banks reflected the epoch when they existed — in the 1990s, people didn't abide by the law. They abode by the unwritten rules of that time, which were called 'notions'. In the framework of such a mindset, the transfer of funds to another bank without the creditors' consent was perceived as a blessing — because the money was saved! As a matter of fact, now it's also possible. Deposit Insurance Agency can transfer clients' liabilities to a "healthy" bank without their consent during the recovery of a "problem" bank. I.e. the team of Rostovsocbank used a similar scheme, although then it was not within the current legislation: in 1994 and 1998, they did it in an attempt to save the money of the clients of the bank's bankrupt branches. Full refund to all depositors of the bank branch on the brink of bankruptcy is a sign of the employees' interest in the well-being of "their" clients. Such "customer-oriented" actions are really hard to imagine in the modern world". Moreover, these events happened when neither DIA nor ARCO (Agency for Restructuring of Credit Organisations), its predecessor, existed yet.

The Bank of Russia revoked the charter of Rostovsocbank in September 1998.

In 1999 ex-employees and clients of the Gukovo branch of Rostovsocbank acquired 100% share of the authorised capital of unprofitable bank "Yegorlyk", which was later renamed as "Donskoy Narodny Bank". Donskoy Narodny Bank, which had the head office and the registered address in Gukovo, within a short time, attracted significant depositors' funds. By 2008, it became a major retail bank in the Rostov region. By 2010 Donskoy Narodny Bank was integrated into OTP-Bank — an affiliate bank of the largest credit organisation in Hungary.
