= Uglerodovsky =

Uglerodovsky Углеродовский
- Urban-type settlement
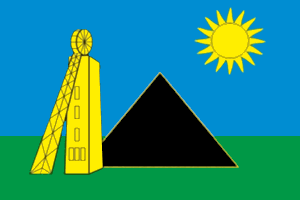
- Flag
- Interactive map of Uglerodovsky
- Location of Uglerodovsky Uglerodovsky (Rostov Oblast)
- Coordinates: 48.1453°N 40.0635°E
- Country: Russia
- Federal subject: Rostov Oblast
- Administrative district: Krasnosulinsky District

Population (2010 Census)
  - Total: 2,510
  - Estimate (2021): 2,242 (−10.7%)
- Time zone: UTC+3 (MSK)
- Postal code: 347896
- OKTMO ID: 60626165051

Uglerodovsky (Russian: Углеродовский) is an urban locality (an urban-type settlement) in Krasnosulinsky District of Rostov Oblast, Russia. Population: 2,510 (2010 census); 2,991 (2002 census); 3,128 (1989 Soviet census).
