= St. Nicholas' Church (Gukovo) =

Coordinates: 47.9874°N 39.9464°E

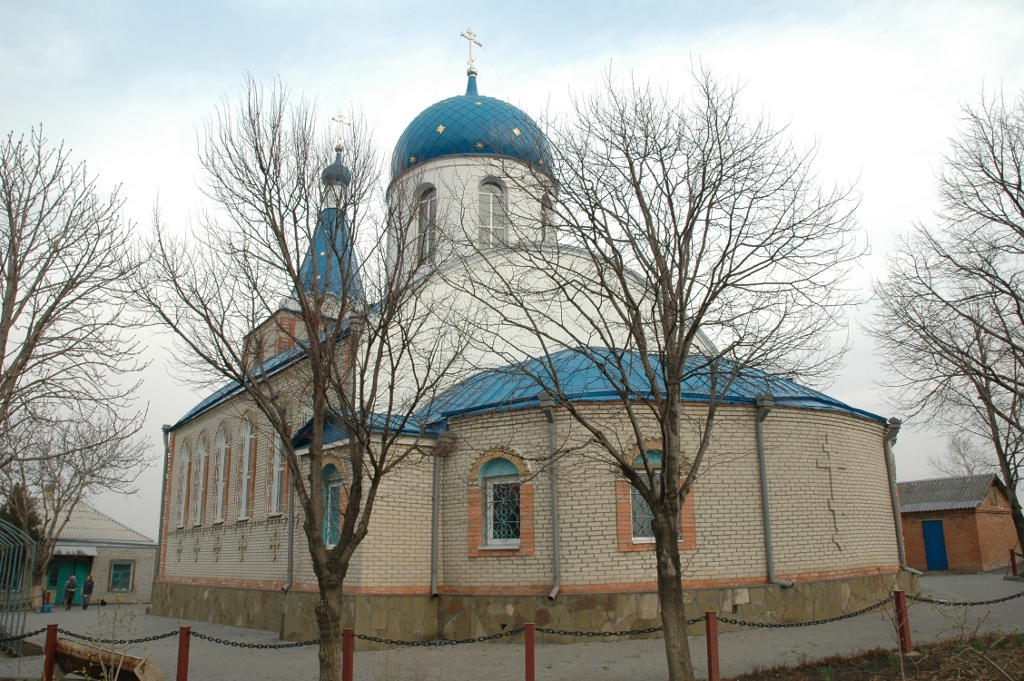

Religion
- Affiliation: Russian Orthodox

Location
- Location: Gukovo village, Krasnosulinsky District, Rostov Oblast, Russia
- Interactive map of St. Nicholas' Church

Architecture
- Completed: 1850

The Church of St. Nicholas (Russian: Церковь Николая Чудотворца) is a Russian Orthodox church in the village of Gukovo, Krasnosulinsky District, Rostov Oblast, Russia. It belongs to the Shakhty Diocese of the Moscow Patriarchate and was built in 1887.

== History ==
The Gukovo church was built in 1887 at the request of local residents to Mitrofan, Archbishop of Don and Novocherkassk. Prior to that, Gukovo had no place of worship, and residents had to go to other villages. This caused great inconvenience to them, especially during river flooding in spring.

St. Nicholas Church after its construction attracted not only locals, but residents of other nearby villages.

The church, unlike many others destroyed on the orders of Soviet authorities or during war, survived revolutionary years and both the Civil War and World War II.

In 1978-1986 the church was reconstructed and significantly expanded. A new foundation was dug, and the walls were lined with brick. In 1992, artist L.N. Sharhun finished painting of the interior walls in the church.
