= Gornoye, Vologda Oblast =

Gornoye Горное
- Village
- Location within Vologda Oblast Location within Russia
- Coordinates: 59°09′N 39°12′E
- Country: Russia
- Region: Vologda Oblast
- District: Vologodsky District
- Time zone: UTC+3:00

Gornoye (Russian: Горное) is a rural locality (a village) in Staroselskoye Rural Settlement, Vologodsky District, Vologda Oblast, Russia. The population was 9 as of 2002.

== Geography ==
Gornoye is located 48 km southwest of Vologda (the district's administrative centre) by road. Boltutino is the nearest rural locality.
