= Gornoye, Republic of Bashkortostan =

Gornoye Горное
- Village
- Location within Bashkortostan Location within Russia
- Coordinates: 55°40′N 56°42′E
- Country: Russia
- Region: Bashkortostan
- District: Karaidelsky District
- Time zone: UTC+5:00

Gornoye (Russian: Горное) is a rural locality (a village) in Urgushevsky Selsoviet, Karaidelsky District, Bashkortostan, Russia. The population was 30 as of 2010. There is 1 street.

== Geography ==
Gornoye is located 43 km southwest of Karaidel (the district's administrative centre) by road. Urgush is the nearest rural locality.
