= Kamensky District, Rostov Oblast =

Kamensky District Каменский район (Russian)
- District
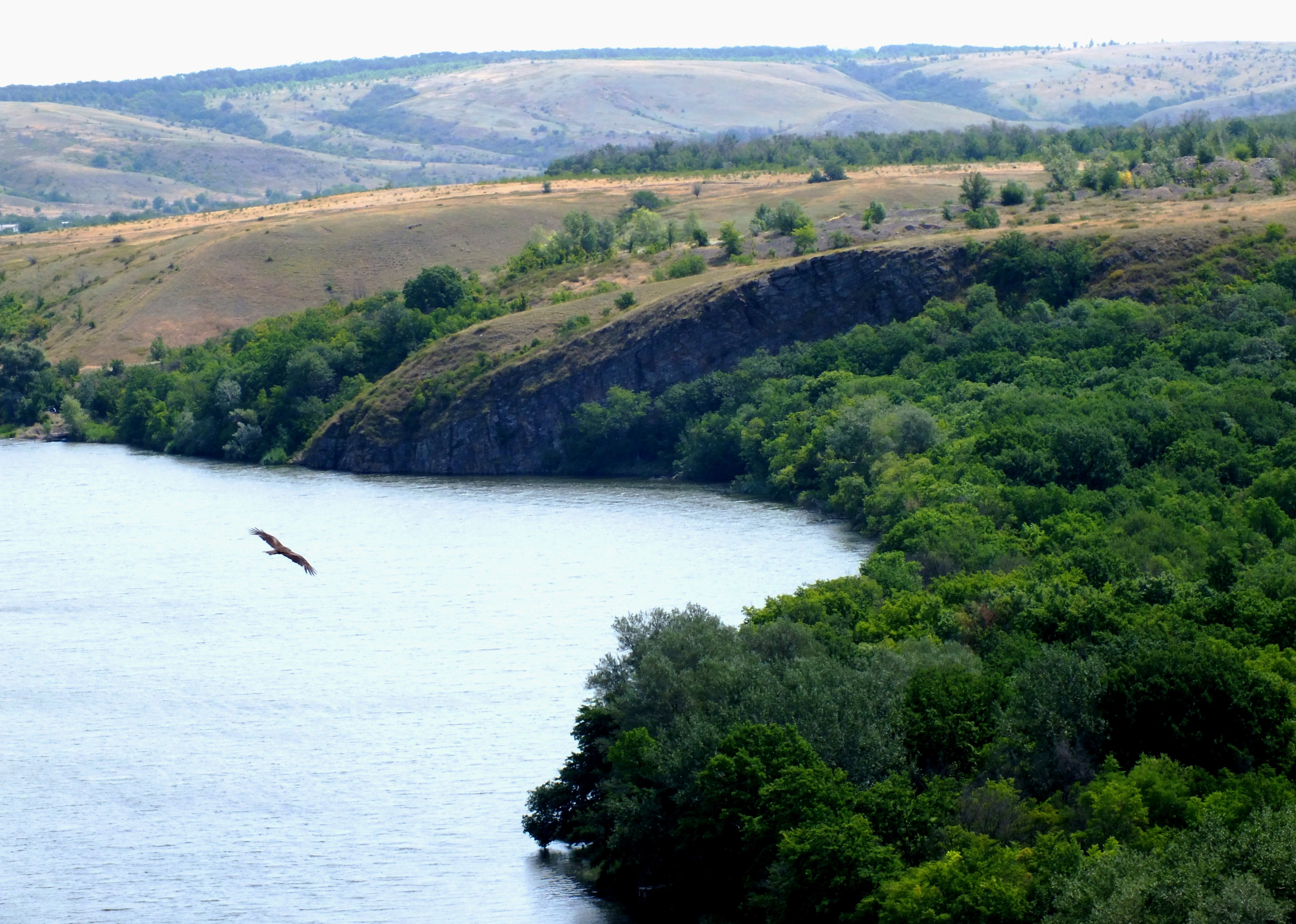
- Urochishe Proboscis, Kamensky District

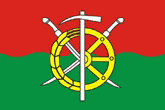
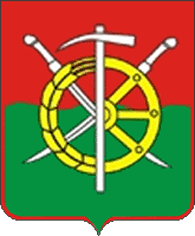
- Flag Coat of arms
- Location of Kamensky District in Rostov Oblast
- Coordinates: 48°31′25″N 40°19′15″E
- Country: Russia
- Federal subject: Rostov Oblast
- Established: 7 March 1923
- Administrative center: Gluboky

Area
  - Total: 2,570 km^{2} (990 sq mi)

Population (2010 Census)
  - Total: 47,696
  - Density: 18.6/km^{2} (48.1/sq mi)
  - Urban: 20.7%
  - Rural: 79.3%

Administrative structure
  - Administrative divisions: 1 Urban settlements, 11 Rural settlements
  - Inhabited localities: 1 urban-type settlements, 77 rural localities

Municipal structure
  - Municipally incorporated as: Kamensky Municipal District
  - Municipal divisions: 1 urban settlements, 11 rural settlements
- Time zone: UTC+3 (MSK)
- OKTMO ID: 60623000
- Website: http://kamray.donland.ru/

Kamensky District (Russian: Ка́менский райо́н) is an administrative and municipal district (raion), one of the forty-three in Rostov Oblast, Russia. It is located in the west of the oblast. The area of the district is 2,570 square kilometers (990 sq mi). Its administrative center is the urban locality (a work settlement) of Gluboky. Population: 47,696 (2010 Census); 51,757 (2002 census); 53,291 (1989 Soviet census). The population of Gluboky accounts for 20.7% of the district's total population.

== 2024 oil infrastructure attack ==
The tank farm fire was detected by NASA's FIRMS from 28 August 08:11:00 (UTC) to 1 September 2024

The Kamenski District in Rostov Oblast is the site of the Atlas oil depot, near the village of Molodezhnyi, a large petroleum tank farm installation of the Russian State Reserve. The Atlas facility is a "division of the Federal Agency for State Reserves in the Southern Federal District, [specializing] in supplying petroleum products to the Russian Armed Forces."

On the morning of 28 August 2024, during the Russian invasion of Ukraine, it was set ablaze by a Ukrainian Armed Forces drone strike. The attack was officially confirmed by the Ukrainian general staff the next day, and Russian sources reported a second attack on the depot occurred late in the day on the 28th, renewing the "powerful blaze."
