= Gorny, Chishminsky District, Republic of Bashkortostan =

Gorny Горный
- Selo
- Location within Bashkortostan Location within Russia
- Coordinates: 54°32′N 55°26′E
- Country: Russia
- Region: Bashkortostan
- District: Chishminsky District
- Time zone: UTC+5:00

Gorny (Russian: Горный) is a rural locality (a selo) in Kara-Yakupovsky Selsoviet, Chishminsky District, Bashkortostan, Russia. The rural locality has 10 streets and, as of 2010, a population of 712.

== Geography ==
Gorny is 14 km southeast of Chishmy, the district's administrative centre. Kara-Yakupovo is the nearest rural locality.
