= Gorny, Arkhangelsky District, Republic of Bashkortostan =

Gorny Горный
- Village
- Location within Bashkortostan Location within Russia
- Coordinates: 54°19′N 56°49′E
- Country: Russia
- Region: Bashkortostan
- District: Arkhangelsky District
- Time zone: UTC+5:00

Gorny (Russian: Горный) is a rural locality (a village) in Arkh-Latyshsky Selsoviet, Arkhangelsky District, Bashkortostan, Russia. The population was 165 as of 2010. There are 4 streets.

== Geography ==
Gorny is located 11 km south of Arkhangelskoye (the district's administrative centre) by road. Krasnaya Regizla is the nearest rural locality.
