= Gorny, Republic of Buryatia =

Gorny Горный
- Settlement
- Location within Republic of Buryatia Location within Russia
- Coordinates: 51°58′N 106°24′E
- Country: Russia
- Region: Republic of Buryatia
- District: Kabansky District
- Time zone: UTC+8:00

Gorny (Russian: Горный) is a rural locality (a settlement) in Kabansky District, Republic of Buryatia, Russia. The population was 159 as of 2010.

== Geography ==
Gorny is located 21 km (13 mi) southwest of Kabansk (the district's administrative centre) by road. Posolskaya is the nearest rural locality.
