= Gluboky, Kamensky District, Rostov Oblast =

Gluboky Глубокий
- Urban-type settlement
- Interactive map of Gluboky
- Location of Gluboky Gluboky (Rostov Oblast)
- Coordinates: 48.5241°N 40.3272°E
- Country: Russia
- Federal subject: Rostov Oblast
- Administrative district: Kamensky District
- Founded: 1871

Population (2010 Census)
  - Total: 9,880
  - Estimate (2021): 8,266 (−16.3%)
- Time zone: UTC+3 (MSK)
- Postal code: 347850
- OKTMO ID: 60623151051

Gluboky (Russian: Глубокий) is an urban locality in Kamensky District of Rostov Oblast, Russia. Population: 9,880 (2010 census); 11,242 (2002 census); 12,198 (1989 Soviet census).
