= Gorny, Kushnarenkovsky District, Republic of Bashkortostan =

Gorny Горный
- Village
- Location within Bashkortostan Location within Russia
- Coordinates: 55°09′N 55°28′E
- Country: Russia
- Region: Bashkortostan
- District: Kushnarenkovsky District
- Time zone: UTC+5:00

Gorny (Russian: Горный) is a rural locality (a village) in Kushnarenkovsky Selsoviet, Kushnarenkovsky District, Bashkortostan, Russia. The population was 6 as of 2010. There are 2 streets.

== Geography ==
Gorny is located 94 km northeast of Kushnarenkovo (the district's administrative centre) by road. Mansurovo is the nearest rural locality.
