= Semikarakorsky District =

Semikarakorsky District Семикаракорский район (Russian)
- District
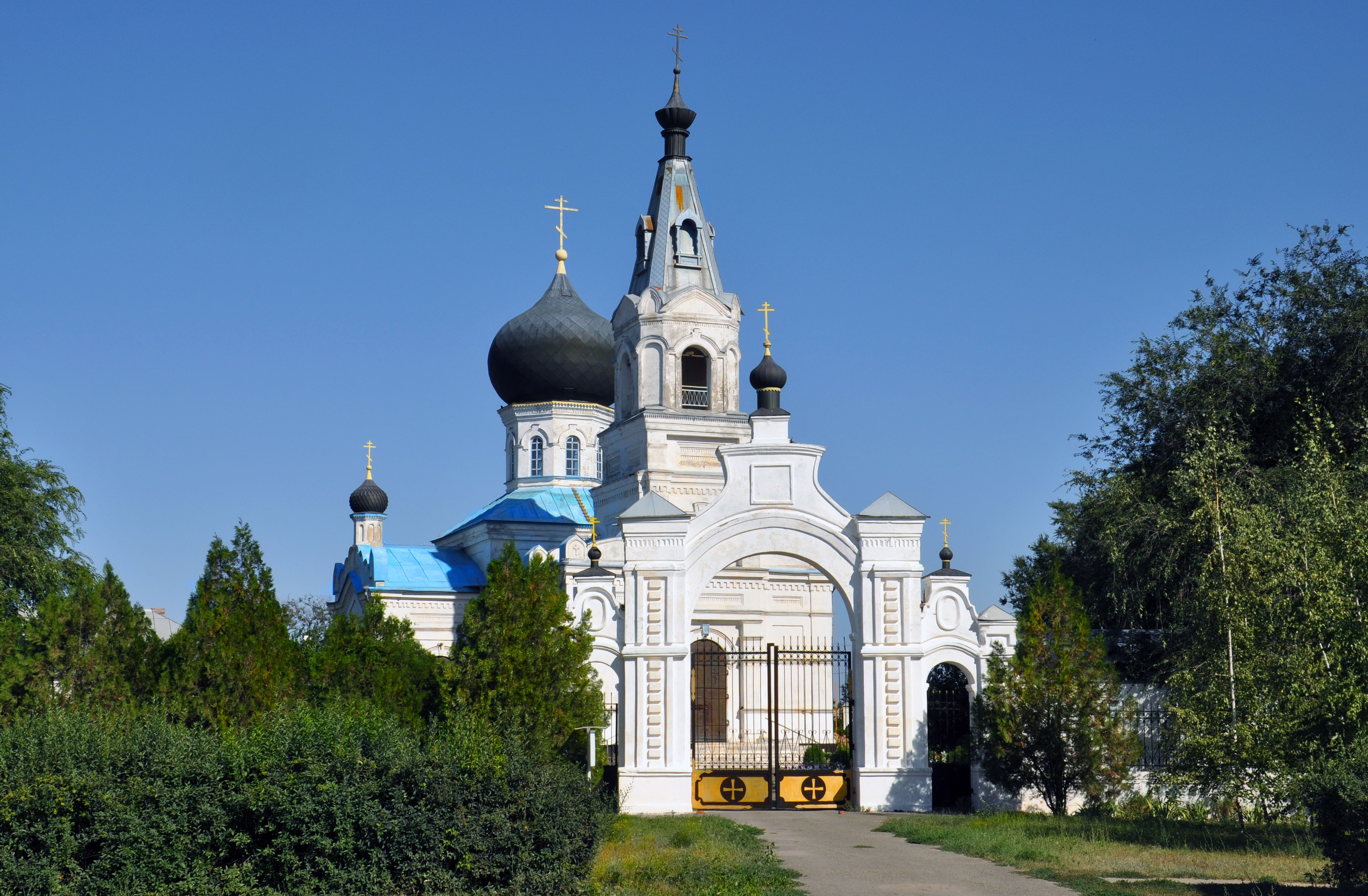
- Ascension Church in Susat, Semikarakorsky District

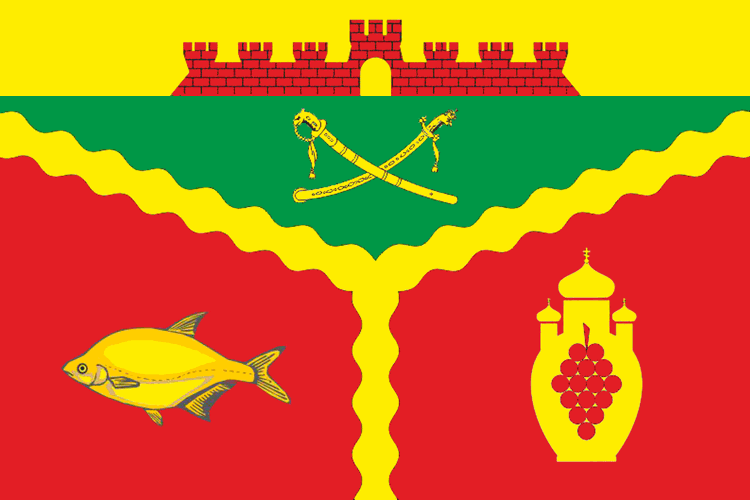
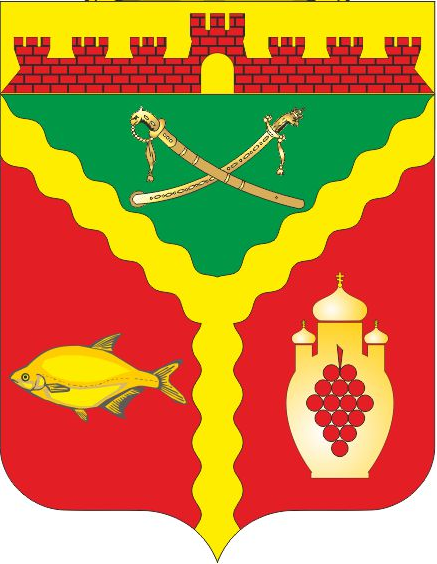
- Flag Coat of arms
- Location of Semikarakorsky District in Rostov Oblast
- Coordinates: 47°31′N 40°48′E
- Country: Russia
- Federal subject: Rostov Oblast
- Established: 1924
- Administrative center: Semikarakorsk

Area
  - Total: 1,402 km^{2} (541 sq mi)

Population (2010 Census)
  - Total: 52,833
  - Density: 37.68/km^{2} (97.60/sq mi)
  - Urban: 45.2%
  - Rural: 54.8%

Administrative structure
  - Administrative divisions: 1 Urban settlements, 9 Rural settlements
  - Inhabited localities: 1 cities/towns, 32 rural localities

Municipal structure
  - Municipally incorporated as: Semikarakorsky Municipal District
  - Municipal divisions: 1 urban settlements, 9 rural settlements
- Time zone: UTC+3 (MSK)
- OKTMO ID: 60651000
- Website: http://semikarakorsk-admrn.donland.ru/

Semikarakorsky District (Russian: Семикарако́рский райо́н) is an administrative and municipal district (raion), one of the forty-three in Rostov Oblast, Russia. It is located in the center of the oblast. The area of the district is 1,402 square kilometers (541 sq mi). Its administrative center is the town of Semikarakorsk. Population: 52,833 (2010 Census); 54,125 (2002 census); 52,222 (1989 Soviet census). The population of Semikarakorsk accounts for 45.2% of the district's total population.
