= Semikarakorsk =

Town in Rostov Oblast, Russia

Semikarakorsk Семикаракорск
- Town
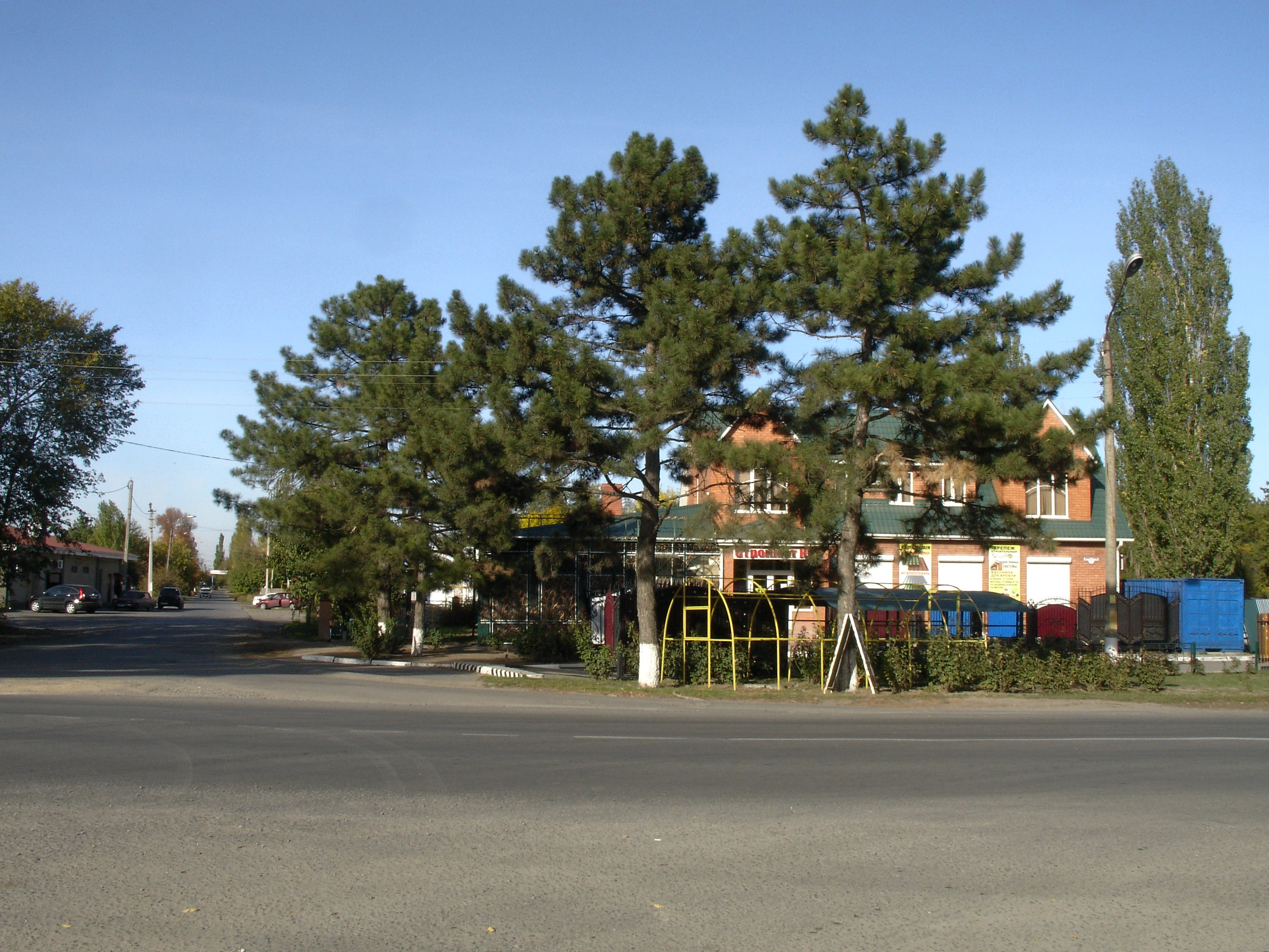
- Crossroads of Avilova and Zelenaya streets, 2018

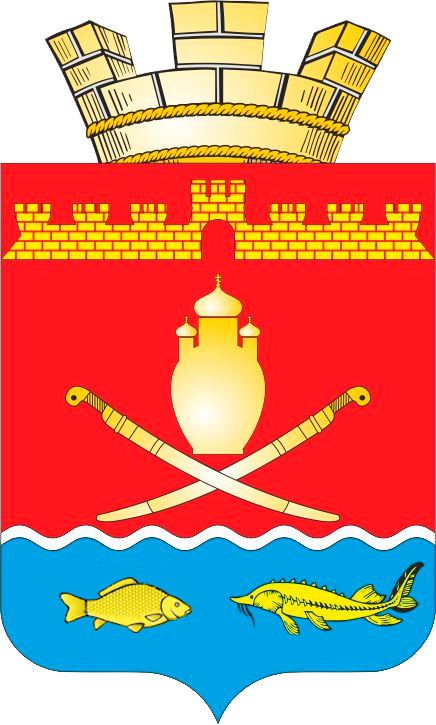
- Coat of arms
- Interactive map of Semikarakorsk
- Location of Semikarakorsk Semikarakorsk (Rostov Oblast)
- Coordinates: 47°31′N 40°48′E
- Country: Russia
- Federal subject: Rostov Oblast
- Administrative district: Semikarakorsky District
- Urban settlementSelsoviet: Semikarakorskoye
- Known since: 1672
- Town status since: 1972
- Elevation: 10 m (33 ft)

Population (2010 Census)
  - Total: 23,884
  - Estimate (2021): 21,719 (−9.1%)

Administrative status
  - Capital of: Semikarakorsky District, Semikarakorskoye Urban Settlement

Municipal status
  - Municipal district: Semikarakorsky Municipal District
  - Urban settlement: Semikarakorskoye Urban Settlement
  - Capital of: Semikarakorsky Municipal District, Semikarakorskoye Urban Settlement
- Time zone: UTC+3 (MSK)
- Postal codes: 346630, 346631
- Dialing code: +7 86356
- OKTMO ID: 60651101001
- Website: semikarakorsk.ru

Semikarakorsk (Russian: Семикарако́рск) is a town and the administrative center of Semikarakorsky District in Rostov Oblast, Russia, located on the left bank of the Don River, 137 kilometers (85 mi) northeast of Rostov-on-Don, the administrative center of the oblast. Population: 23,884 (2010 census); 23,473 (2002 census); 22,704 (1989 Soviet census).

== History ==
The stanitsa of Semikarakorskaya (Семикаракорская), which was founded by the Don Cossacks, was known since 1672. The stanitsa changed its location frequently due to Don's flooding and finally was moved to its present location in 1845. It was granted urban-type settlement status in 1958 and town status in 1972.

== Administrative and municipal status ==
Within the framework of administrative divisions, Semikarakorsk serves as the administrative center of Semikarakorsky District. As an administrative division, it is incorporated within Semikarakorsky District as Semikarakorskoye Urban Settlement. As a municipal division, this administrative unit also has urban settlement status and is a part of Semikarakorsky Municipal District.

== Notable people ==
- Alibek Bashkayev (born 1989), judoka
- Aleksandr Podbeltsev (born 1993), football player
