= Gorny, Krasnosulinsky District, Rostov Oblast =

Gorny Горный
- Urban-type settlement
- Interactive map of Gorny
- Location of Gorny Gorny (Rostov Oblast)
- Coordinates: 47.8175°N 40.1997°E
- Country: Russia
- Federal subject: Rostov Oblast
- Administrative district: Krasnosulinsky District
- Founded: 1912

Population (2010 Census)
  - Total: 2,408
  - Estimate (2021): 2,452 (+1.8%)
- Time zone: UTC+3 (MSK)
- Postal code: 346385
- OKTMO ID: 60626102051

Gorny (Russian: Горный) is an urban locality (an urban-type settlement) in Krasnosulinsky District of Rostov Oblast, Russia. Population: 2,408 (2010 census); 2,720 (2002 census); 2,709 (1989 Soviet census).
