= Gorny, Primorsky Krai =

Village in Kirovsky District, Primorsky Krai, Russia

Coordinates: 44°50′30″N 133°57′20″E

Gorny (Russian: Горный) is a rural locality (a selo) in Kirovsky District, Primorsky Krai, Russia. Population: 100 (2010 census); 219 (2002 census);

== History ==
From 1955 to 2013, it had the status of urban-type settlement. On December 19, 2013, it was downgraded to the status of rural locality.
