= Sholokhovsky (urban-type settlement) =

Sholokhovsky Шолоховский
- Urban-type settlement
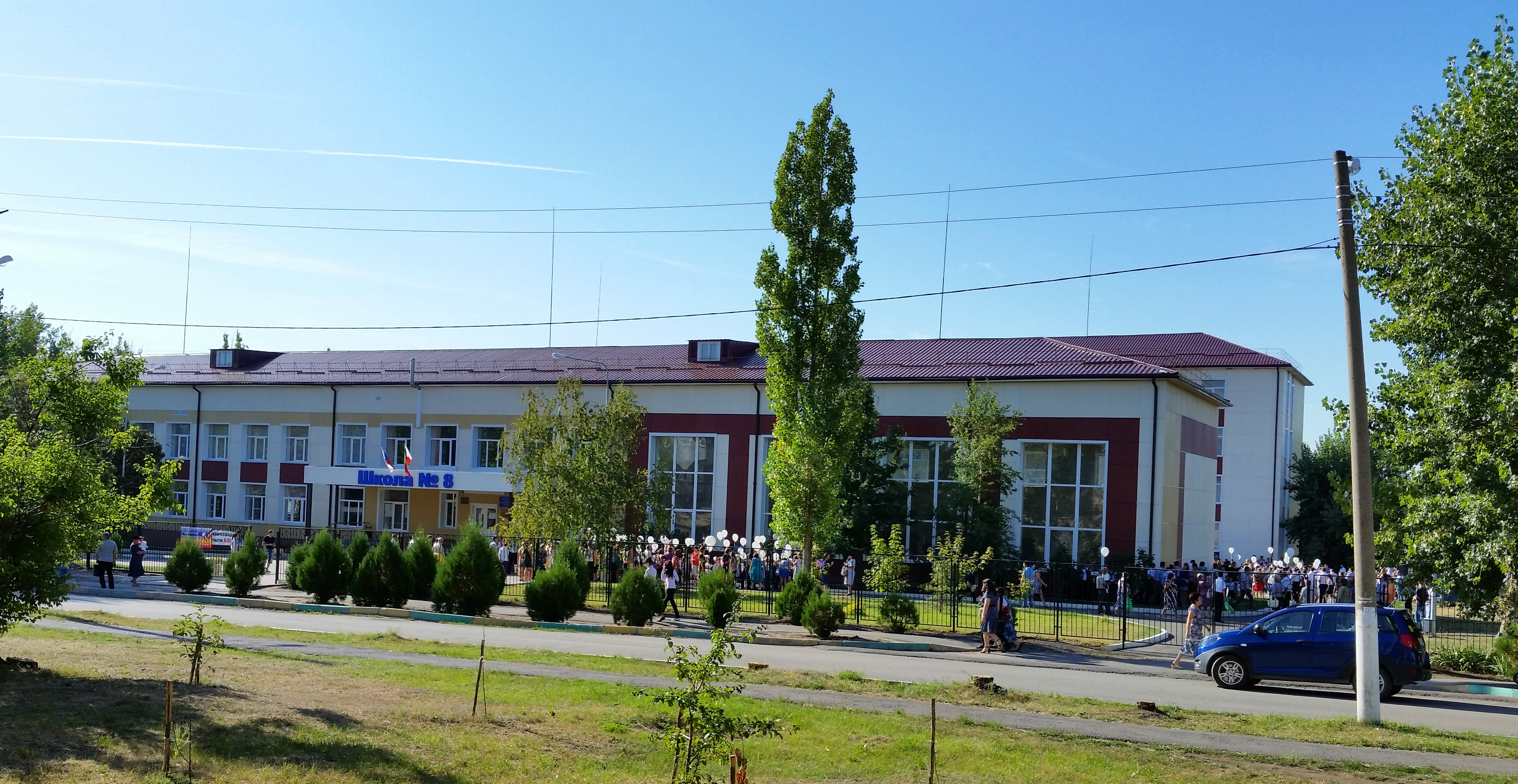

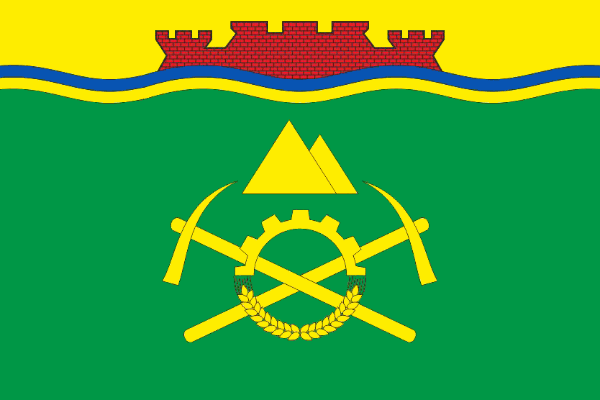
- Flag
- Interactive map of Sholokhovsky
- Location of Sholokhovsky Sholokhovsky (Rostov Oblast)
- Coordinates: 48.2823°N 41.0491°E
- Country: Russia
- Federal subject: Rostov Oblast
- Administrative district: Belokalitvinsky District
- Founded: 1953
- Elevation: 155 m (509 ft)

Population (2010 Census)
  - Total: 8,306
  - Estimate (2021): 7,358 (−11.4%)
- Time zone: UTC+3 (MSK)
- Postal code: 347022
- OKTMO ID: 60606102051

Sholokhovsky (Russian: Шолоховский) is an urban locality (an urban-type settlement) in Belokalitvinsky District of Rostov Oblast, Russia. Population: 8,306 (2010 census); 10,077 (2002 census); 13,328 (1989 Soviet census).
