= Kirovsky City District, Rostov-on-Don =

Urban district in Rostov-on-Don, Russia

Kirovsky District Кировский район
- District
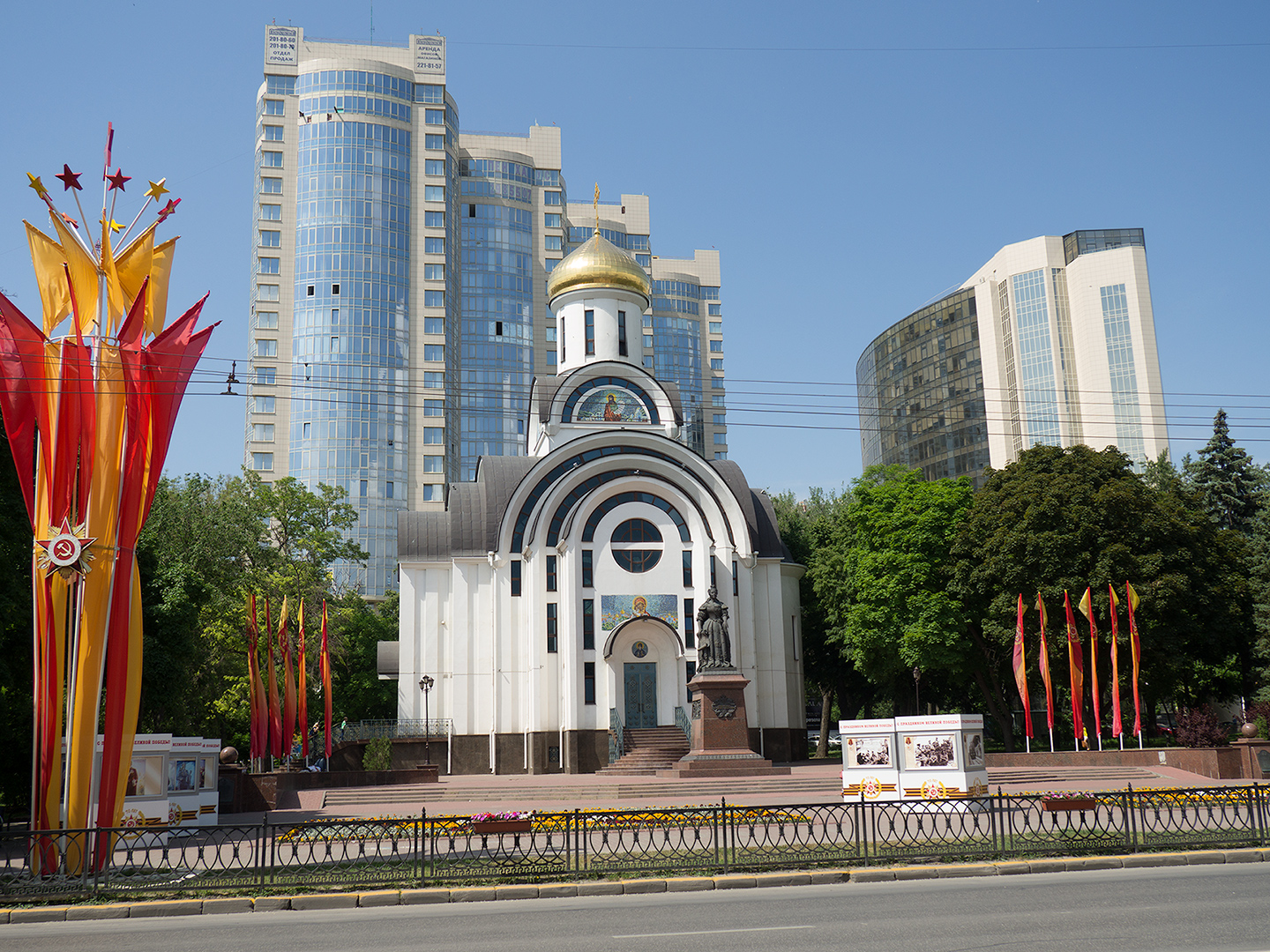
- Pokrovsky Square within the district

- Coat of arms

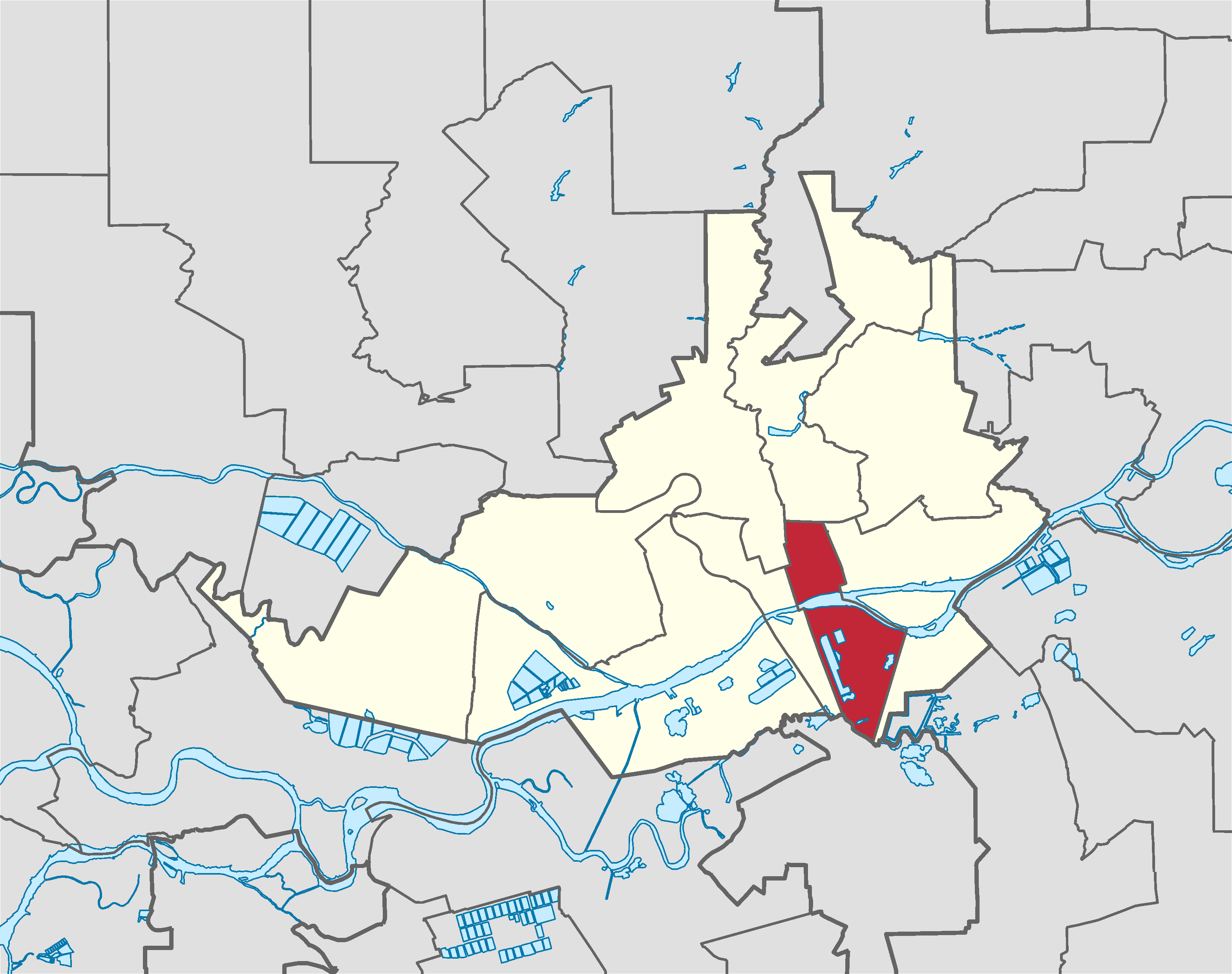
- Location in Rostov-on-Don

- Location within Rostov Oblast Location within European Russia Location within Russia
- Coordinates: 47°12′44″N 39°40′39″E
- Country: Russia
- Federal subject: Rostov
- City: Rostov-on-Don
- Created on: 1936

Area
  - Total: 18.6 km^{2} (7.2 sq mi)
- Elevation: 71 m (233 ft)

Population (2021)
  - Total: 59,561
  - Density: 3,200/km^{2} (8,290/sq mi)
- Time zone: UTC+3 (MSK)
- Postal code: 344xxx
- Telephone code: +7 863

Kirovsky District (Russian: Кировский район, romanized: Kirovskiy rayon) is one of the 8 city districts of Rostov-on-Don, Rostov Oblast, Russia. It hosts the city government of Rostov-on-Don as well as the provincial government of Rostov Oblast. In the year 2021, its total population is 59,561.

== Geography ==
Kirovsky District is located on the southern portion of Rostov-on-Don, on the banks of the Don River. It borders Voroshilovsky District to the north, Proletarsky District to the east, the city of Bataysk to the south, as well as Pervomaysky and Oktyabrsky Districts to the west. It covers a total area of 18.6 square kilometers.

== History ==
In 1749, the Fortress of Saint Dimitry of Rostov and a small Russian settlement was established in the area. It became the administrative center of Rostov-on-Don as the city grew in size. In 1857, the first industrial enterprise of Rostov appeared in the region. Around the same time, an early attempt was made to build a water pipe from the Bogatogo Well. The district was formally created in 1936.

== Population ==
Historical population
Year	Pop.	±%
1959	109,626	—
1970	98,496	−10.2%
1979	94,150	−4.4%
1989	81,484	−13.5%
2002	69,024	−15.3%
2009	59,922	−13.2%
2010	65,987	+10.1%
2012	65,681	−0.5%
2013	65,322	−0.5%
2014	65,239	−0.1%
2015	64,702	−0.8%
2016	64,019	−1.1%
2017	63,499	−0.8%
2018	62,782	−1.1%
2019	61,857	−1.5%
2020	61,218	−1.0%
2021	59,561	−2.7%

== Galleries ==
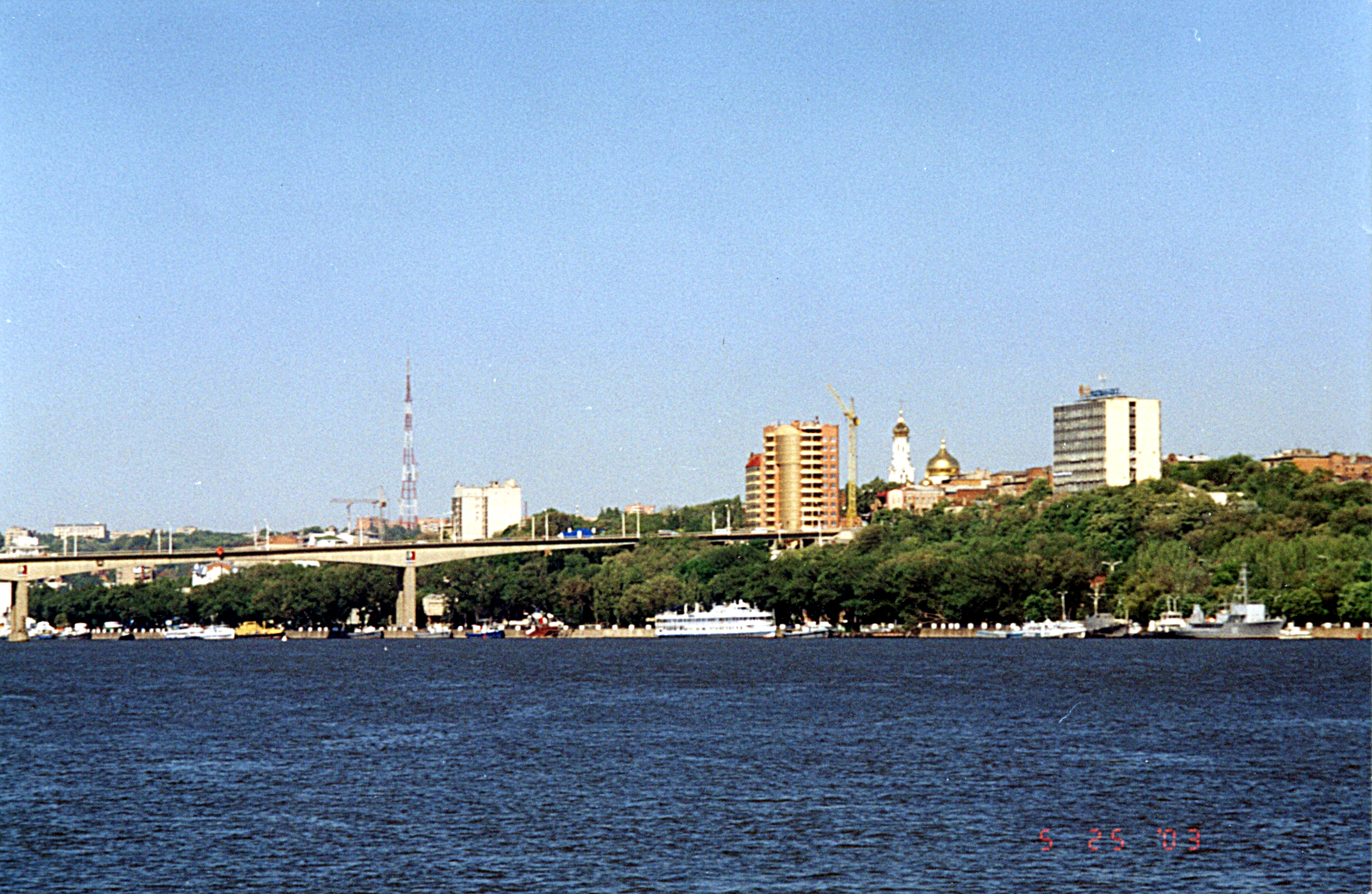
View of Kirovsky District from the Don River

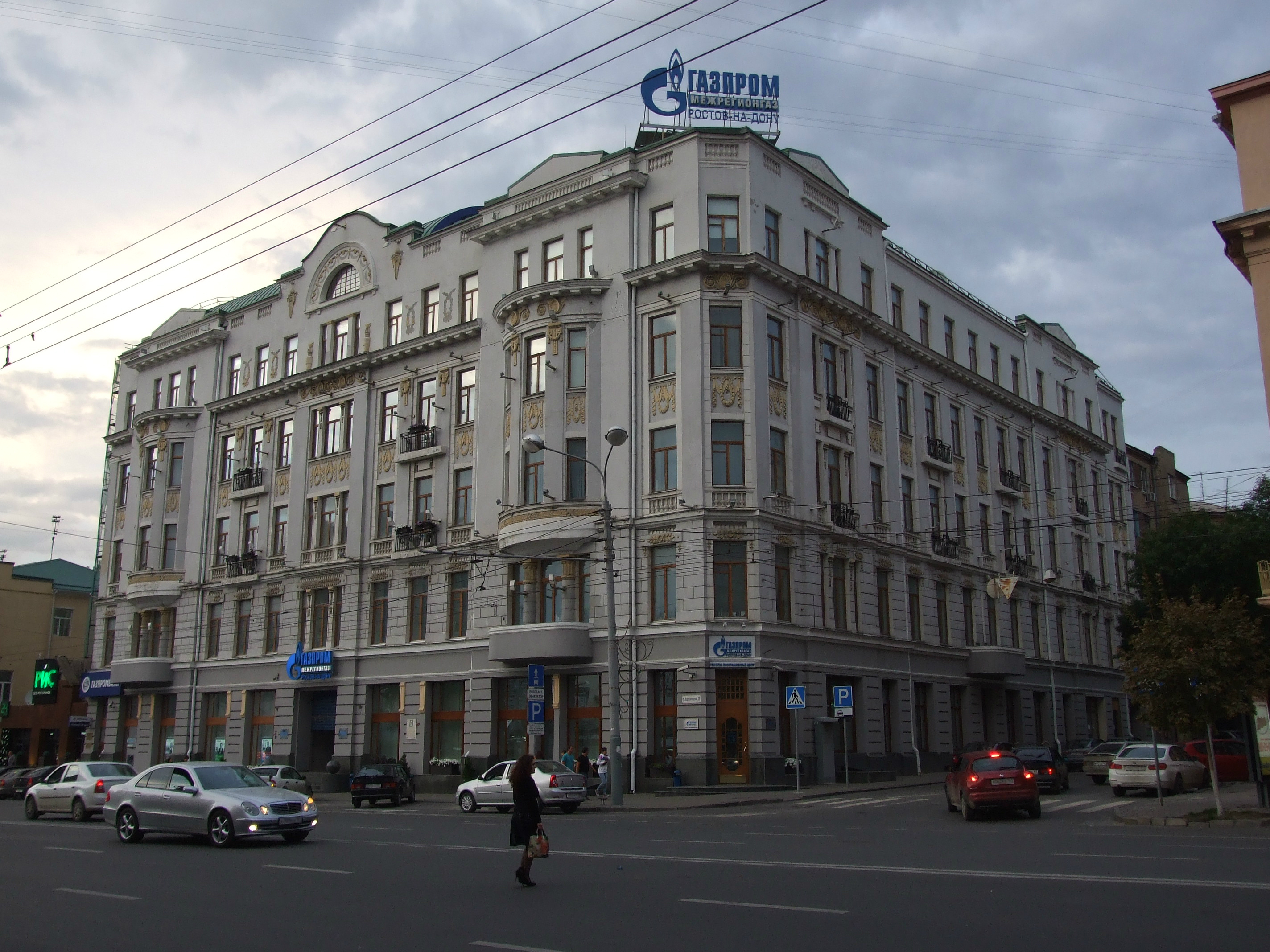
Suvorova Street

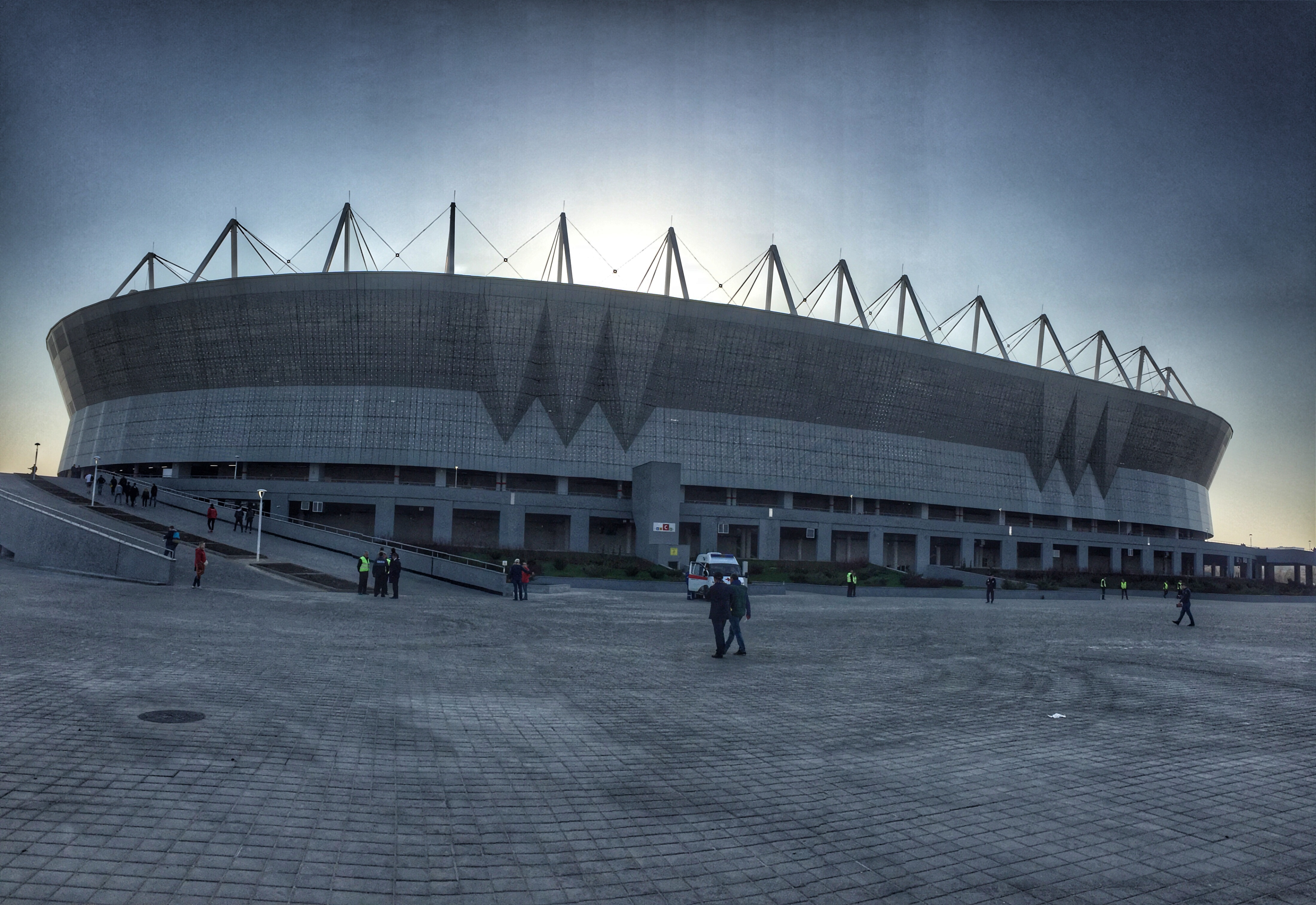
Rostov Arena on the southern portion of the district

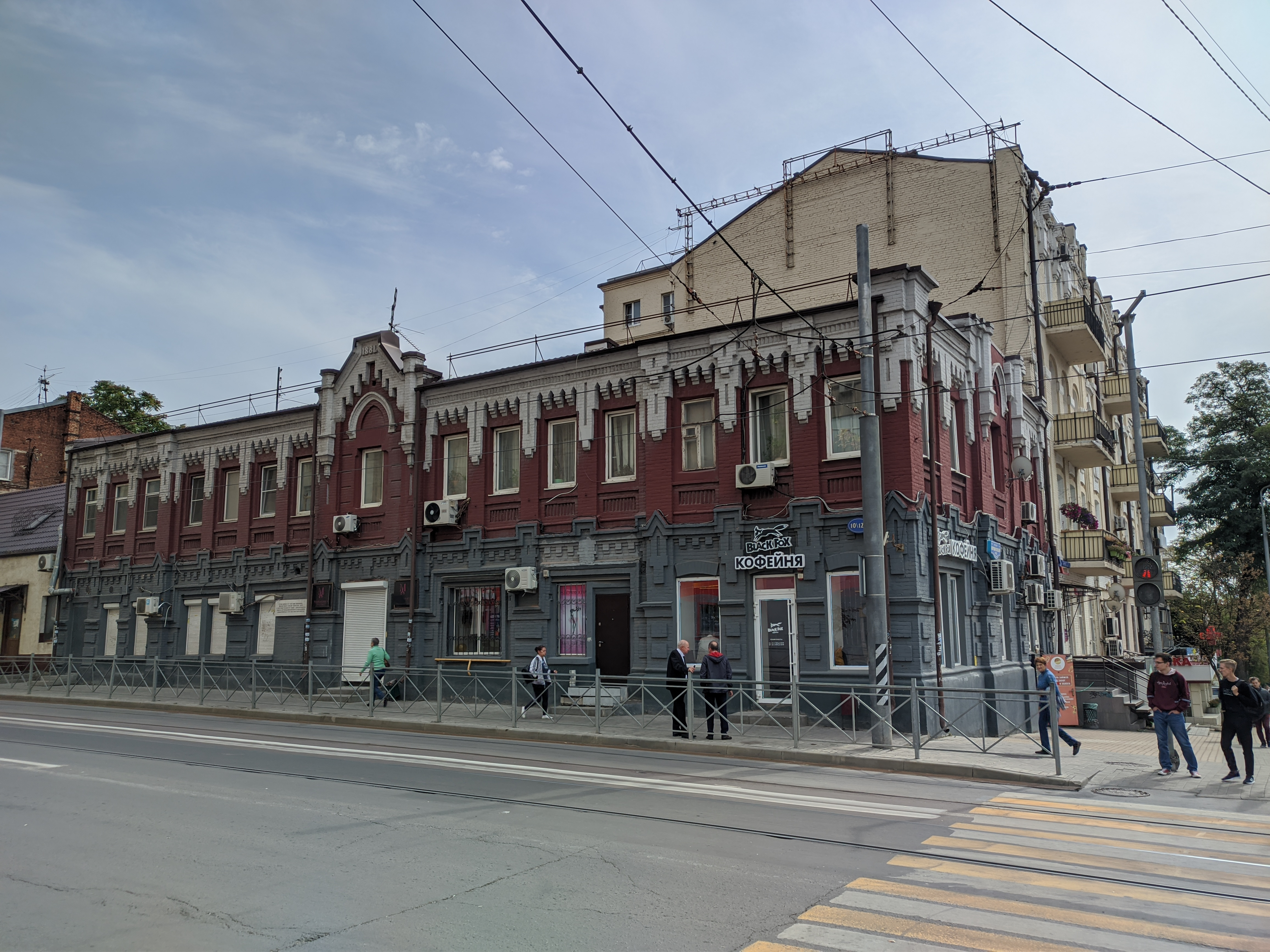
Stanislavsky Street
