= Krasny Sulin =

Town in Rostov Oblast, Russia

Krasny Sulin Красный Сулин
- Town
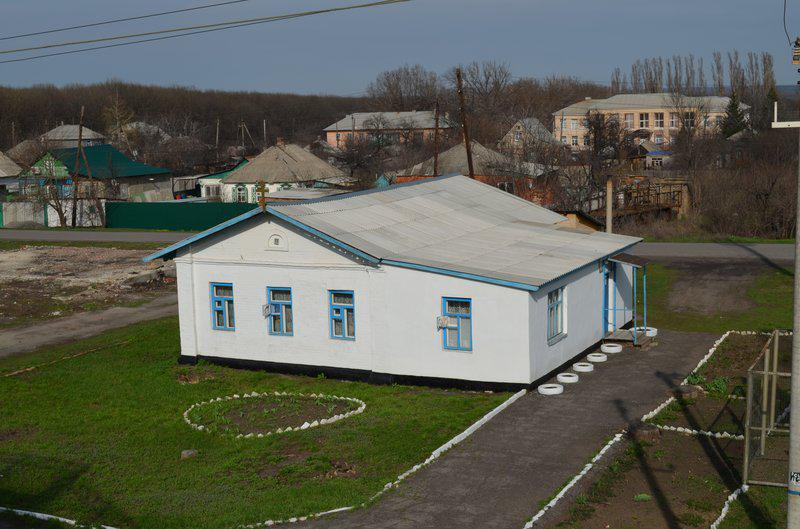

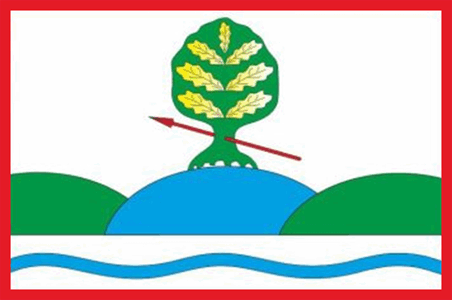
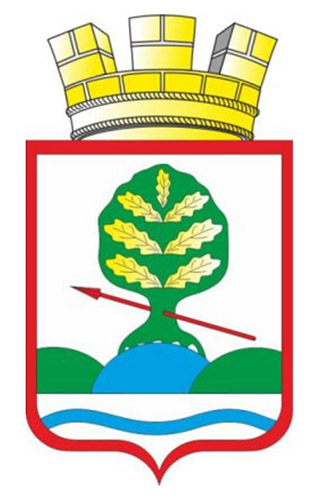
- Flag Coat of arms
- Interactive map of Krasny Sulin
- Location of Krasny Sulin Krasny Sulin (Rostov Oblast)
- Coordinates: 47°53′N 40°06′E
- Country: Russia
- Federal subject: Rostov Oblast
- Administrative district: Krasnosulinsky District
- Urban settlementSelsoviet: Krasnosulinskoye
- Founded: 1797
- Elevation: 150 m (490 ft)

Population (2010 Census)
  - Total: 40,866
  - Estimate (2025): 34,694 (−15.1%)

Administrative status
  - Capital of: Krasnosulinsky District, Krasnosulinskoye Urban Settlement

Municipal status
  - Municipal district: Krasnosulinsky Municipal District
  - Urban settlement: Krasnosulinskoye Urban Settlement
  - Capital of: Krasnosulinsky Municipal District, Krasnosulinskoye Urban Settlement
- Time zone: UTC+3 (MSK)
- Postal codes: 346350–346353, 346355–346361, 346369
- OKTMO ID: 60626101001
- Website: sulin.ksrayon.donland.ru

Krasny Sulin (Russian: Кра́сный Сули́н) is a town and the administrative center of Krasnosulinsky District in Rostov Oblast, Russia, located in the Donets Basin region. Population: 40,866 (2010 census); 44,187 (2002 census); 43,133 (1989 Soviet census).

Within the framework of administrative divisions, Krasny Sulin serves as the administrative center of Krasnosulinsky District. As an administrative division, it is incorporated within Krasnosulinsky District as Krasnosulinskoye Urban Settlement. As a municipal division, this administrative unit also has urban settlement status and is a part of Krasnosulinsky Municipal District.

== Cultural and religious objects ==
- Church of the Intercession (built in 1914)
