= Krasnosulinsky District =

Krasnosulinsky District Красносулинский район (Russian)
- District
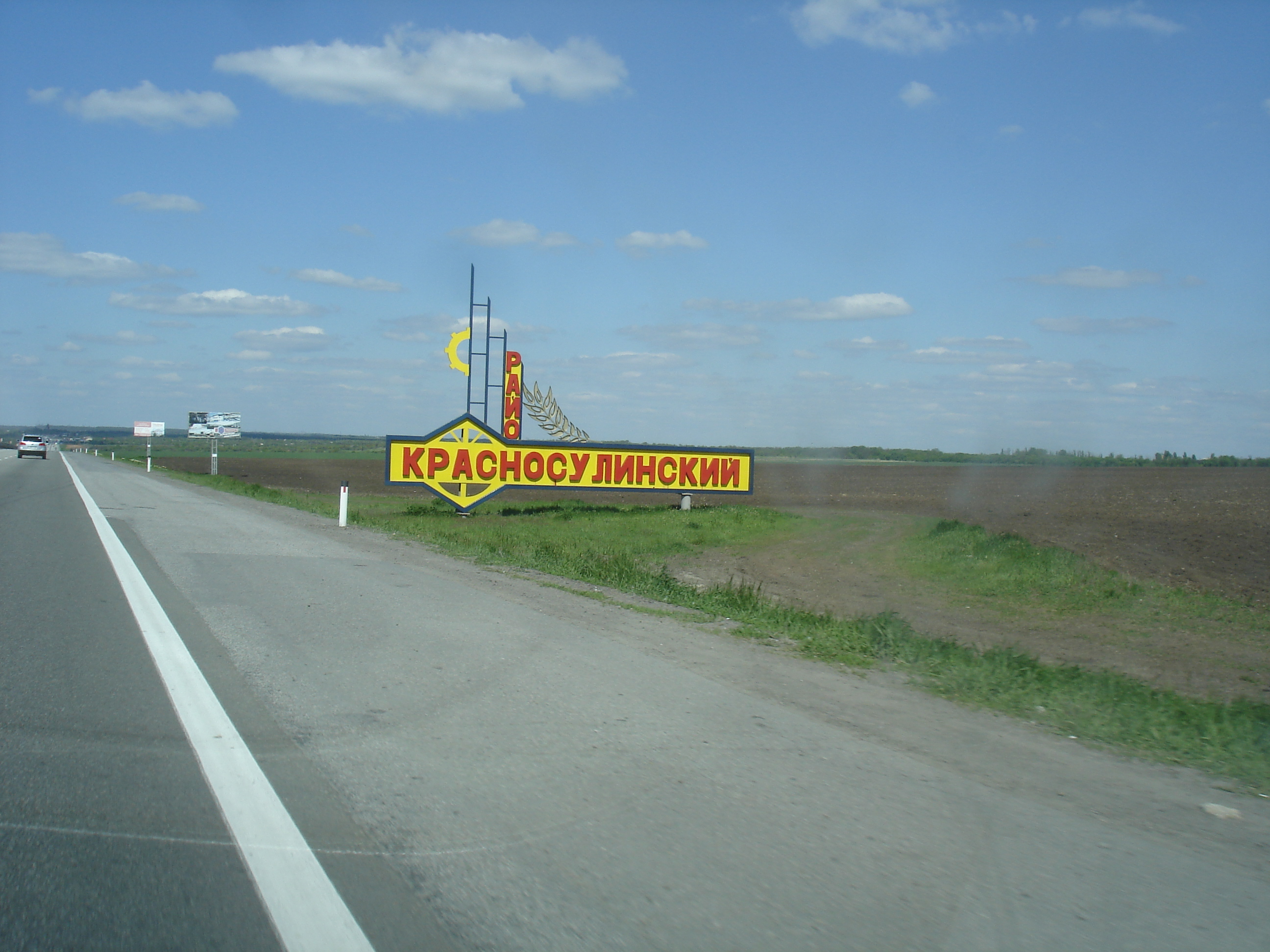
- Entrance to Krasnosulinsky District

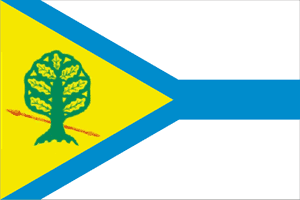
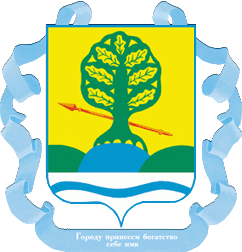
- Flag Coat of arms
- Location of Krasnosulinsky District in Rostov Oblast
- Coordinates: 47°53′N 40°04′E
- Country: Russia
- Federal subject: Rostov Oblast
- Established: 1923
- Administrative center: Krasny Sulin

Area
  - Total: 2,104 km^{2} (812 sq mi)

Population (2010 Census)
  - Total: 81,825
  - Density: 38.89/km^{2} (100.7/sq mi)
  - Urban: 56.0%
  - Rural: 44.0%

Administrative structure
  - Administrative divisions: 1 Urban settlements (towns), 2 Urban settlements (work settlements), 12 Rural settlements
  - Inhabited localities: 1 cities/towns, 2 urban-type settlements, 77 rural localities

Municipal structure
  - Municipally incorporated as: Krasnosulinsky Municipal District
  - Municipal divisions: 3 urban settlements, 12 rural settlements
- Time zone: UTC+3 (MSK)
- OKTMO ID: 60626000
- Website: http://ksrayon.donland.ru/

Krasnosulinsky District (Russian: Красносули́нский райо́н) is an administrative and municipal district (raion), one of the forty-three in Rostov Oblast, Russia. It is located in the west of the oblast. The area of the district is 2,104 square kilometers (812 sq mi). Its administrative center is the town of Krasny Sulin. Population: 81,825 (2010 Census); 34,906 (2002 census); 36,814 (1989 Soviet census). The population of Krasny Sulin accounts for 49.9% of the district's total population.
