= List of rural localities in Rostov Oblast =

Map of Russia with Rostov Oblast highlighted

This is a list of rural localities in the Rostov Oblast. Rostov Oblast (Russian: Росто́вская о́бласть, romanized: Rostovskaya oblast, IPA: [rɐˈstofskəjə ˈobləsʲtʲ]) is a federal subject of Russia (an oblast), located in the Southern Federal District. The oblast has an area of 100,800 square kilometers (38,900 sq mi) and a population of 4,277,976 (2010 Census), making it the sixth most populous federal subject in Russia. Its administrative center is the city of Rostov-on-Don, which also became the administrative center of the Southern Federal District in 2002.

== Aksaysky District ==
Rural localities in Aksaysky District:

- Starocherkasskaya

== Azovsky District ==
Rural localities in Azovsky District:

- Kuleshovka
- Samarskoye

== Bagayevsky District ==
Rural localities in Bagayevsky District:

- Arpachin
- Bagayevskaya

== Bogucharsky District ==
Rural localities in Bogucharsky District:

- Abrosimovo

== Bokovsky District ==
Rural localities in Bokovsky District:

- Bokovskaya
- Grachyov

== Chertkovsky District ==
Rural localities in Chertkovsky District:

- Chertkovo

== Dubovsky District ==
Rural localities in Dubovsky District:

- Dubovskoye

== Kagalnitsky District ==
Rural localities in Kagalnitsky District:

- Kagalnitskaya

== Kamensky District ==
Rural localities in Kamensky District:

- Abramovka

== Kasharsky District ==
Rural localities in Kasharsky District:

- Kashary

== Kuybyshevsky District ==
Rural localities in Kuybyshevsky District:

- Kuybyshevo

== Martynovsky District ==
Rural localities in Martynovsky District:

- Abrikosovy
- Bolshaya Martynovka

== Matveyevo-Kurgansky District ==
Rural localities in Matveyevo-Kurgansky District:

- Matveyev Kurgan

== Milyutinsky District ==
Rural localities in Milyutinsky District:

- Milyutinskaya

== Myasnikovsky District ==
Rural localities in Myasnikovsky District:

- Bolshiye Saly
- Chaltyr
- Hapry

== Neklinovsky District ==
Rural localities in Neklinovsky District:

- Golovinka
- Pokrovskoye

== Oblivsky District ==
Rural localities in Oblivsky District:

- Oblivskaya

== Orlovsky District ==
Rural localities in Orlovsky District:

- Orlovsky

== Peschanokopsky District ==
Rural localities in Peschanokopsky District:

- Peschanokopskoye

== Remontnensky District ==
Rural localities in Remontnensky District:

- Remontnoye

== Rodionovo-Nesvetaysky District ==
Rural localities in Rodionovo-Nesvetaysky District:

- Persianovka
- Rodionovo-Nesvetayskaya

== Salsky District ==
Rural localities in Salsky District:

- 25 let Voenkonezavoda
- Gigant

== Semikarakorsky District ==
Rural localities in Semikarakorsky District:

- Susat

== Sholokhovsky District ==
Rural localities in Sholokhovsky District:

- Vyoshenskaya

== Sovetsky District ==
Rural localities in Sovetsky District:

- Sovetskaya

== Tarasovsky District ==
Rural localities in Tarasovsky District:

- Tarasovsky

== Tatsinsky District ==
Rural localities in Tatsinsky District:

- Tatsinskaya
- Uglegorsky

== Tselinsky District ==
Rural localities in Tselinsky District:

- Tselina

== Verkhnedonskoy District ==
Rural localities in Verkhnedonskoy District:

- Kazanskaya

== Vesyolovsky District ==
Rural localities in Vesyolovsky District:

- Vesyoly

== Volgodonskoy District ==
Rural localities in Volgodonskoy District:

- Romanovskaya

== Yegorlyksky District ==
Rural localities in Yegorlyksky District:

- Gaidamachka
- Yegorlykskaya

== Zavetinsky District ==
Rural localities in Zavetinsky District:

- Zavetnoye

== Zernogradsky District ==
Rural localities in Zernogradsky District:

- 1st Rossoshinskiy
- 2nd Rossoshinskiy

== Zimovnikovsky District ==
Rural localities in Zimovnikovsky District:

- Zimovniki

== See also ==
- Lists of rural localities in Russia
