= Rostov constituency (Rostov Oblast) =

Legislative constituency in Russia

Rostov single-member constituency
- Constituency of the Russian State Duma
- Deputy: Dmitry Sizyakin; United Russia
- Federal subject: Rostov Oblast
- Districts: Rostov-on-Don (Kirovsky, Leninsky, Oktyabrsky, Proletarsky, Sovetsky, Zheleznodorozhny)
- Voters: 540,202 (2026)

The Rostov constituency (No.151 (Note: Rostov-Sovetsky constituency No.145 in 1993-1995, No.146 in 1995-2007, No.149 in 2016–2026)) is a Russian legislative constituency in Rostov Oblast. The constituency covers most of Rostov-on-Don, except for the north-eastern part of the city.

The constituency has been represented since 2026 by United Russia deputy Dmitry Sizyakin, former Member of Legislative Assembly of Rostov Oblast and urologist, who won the open seat, succeeding two-term United Russia incumbent Larisa Tutova.

== Boundaries ==
1993–1995 Rostov-Sovetsky constituency: Azov, Azovsky District, Bataysk, Kagalnitsky District, Rostov-on-Don (Oktyabrsky, Sovetsky), Vesyolovsky District, Yegorlyksky District, Zernogradsky District
The constituency covered western Rostov-on-Don, its southern suburbs, satellite cities Azov and Bataysk as well as rural south-western Rostov Oblast.

1995–2007: Myasnikovsky District, Rostov-on-Don (Kirovsky, Leninsky, Oktyabrsky, Sovetsky, Zheleznodorozhny)
After the 1995 redistricting Rostov Oblast gained the seventh constituency, so all other districts were redrawn. New Rostov constituency was reconfigured to an almost entirely urban seat, losing Azov and Kagalnitsky District to Taganrog constituency, Bataysk to Proletarsky constituency, Yegorlyksky and Zernogradsky districts – to new Belaya Kalitva constituency. This seat instead gained central Rostov-on-Don from Rostov-Pervomaysky constituency as well as Armenian-majority Myasnikovsky District in the city northern suburbs from Taganrog constituency.

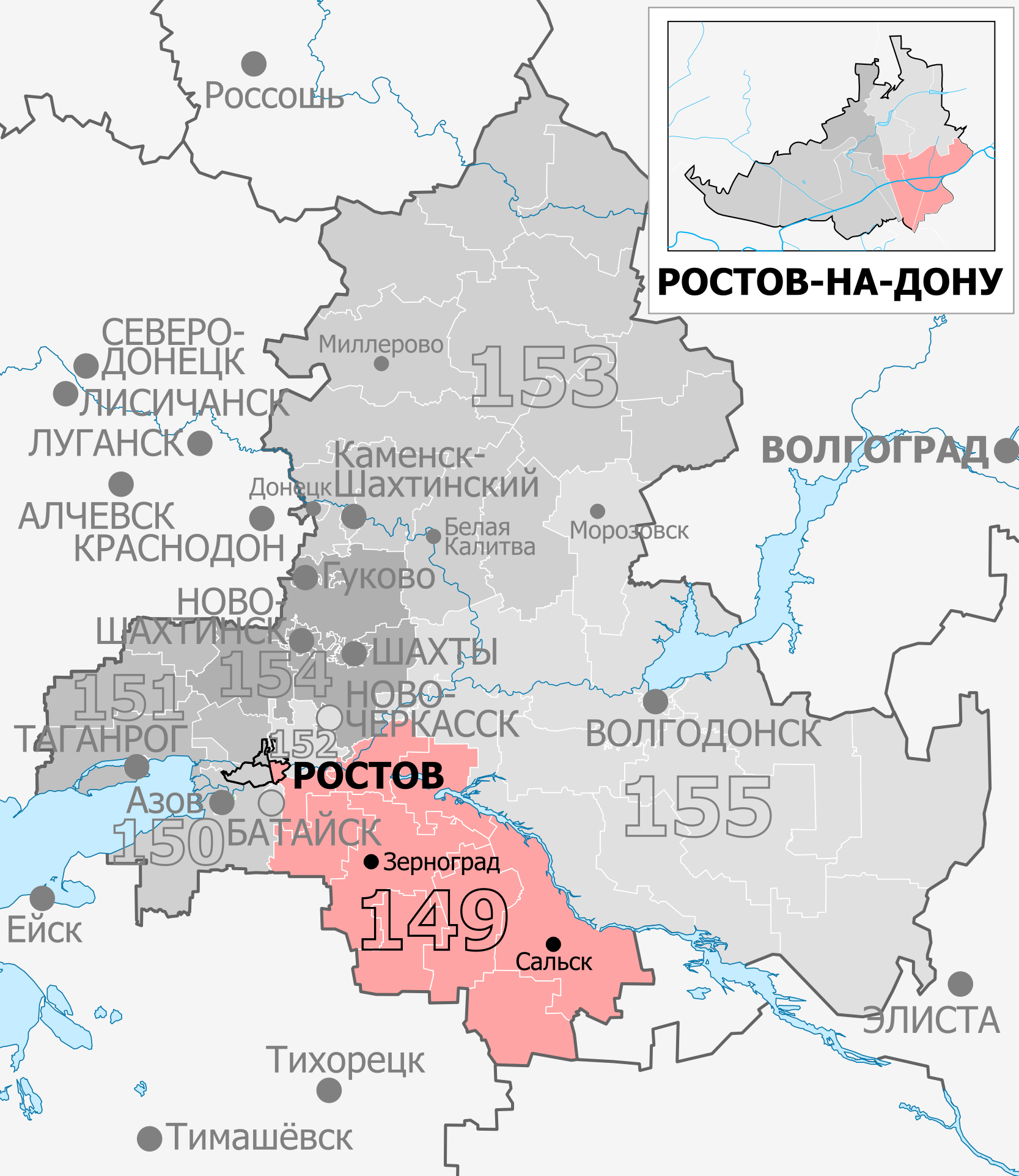
Constituency boundaries from 2016 to 2026

2016–2026: Aksaysky District (Istominskoye, Leninskoye, Olginskoye, Verkhnepodpolnenskoye), Bagayevsky District, Kagalnitsky District, Peschanokopsky District, Rostov-on-Don (Kirovsky, Proletarsky), Salsky District, Tselinsky District, Vesyolovsky District, Yegorlyksky District, Zernogradsky District
The constituency was re-created for the 2016 election and retained only downtown Kirovsky City District of Rostov-on-Don, losing western half of the city to new Nizhnedonskoy constituency, while Oktyabrsky City District and Myasnikovsky District were ceded to Taganrog constituency. This seat instead gained Proletarsky City District from Proletarsky constituency as well as rural southern Rostov Oblast from Taganrog, Belaya Kalitva and Volgodonsk constituencies.

2026–present: Rostov-on-Don (Kirovsky, Leninsky, Oktyabrsky, Proletarsky, Sovetsky, Zheleznodorozhny)
Following the 2025 redistricting Rostov Oblast lost one of its seven constituencies, so all the remaining seats saw major changes. Rostov constituency was reconfigured to an entirely urban seat, covering most of Rostov-on-Don, except the north-eastern corner of the city, after the seat gained territories from Nizhnedonskoy and Taganrog constituencies. This seat had to shed its rural southern territories to Bataysk constituency.

== Members elected ==
Election	Member	Party
1993	Igor Bratishchev	Communist Party
1995	Mikhail Yemelyanov	Yabloko
1999	Mikhail Yemelyanov	Yabloko
2003	Mikhail Yemelyanov	Yabloko
2007	Proportional representation - no election by constituency	
2011	Proportional representation - no election by constituency	
2016	Larisa Tutova	United Russia
2021	Larisa Tutova	United Russia
2026	Dmitry Sizyakin	United Russia

== Election results ==
=== 1993 ===
Summary of the 12 December 1993 Russian legislative election in the Rostov-Sovetsky constituency
Candidate	Party	Votes	%
Igor Bratishchev	Communist Party	61,454	20.27%
Mikhail Yemelyanov	Choice of Russia	48,115	15.87%
Ivan Miroshnichenko	Party of Russian Unity and Accord	35,195	11.61%
Viktor Chernobayev	Independent	26,783	8.84%
Anatoly Vishnevy	Independent	20,538	6.78%
Vladimir Kalinko	Independent	17,323	5.71%
Sergey Gorshkov	Independent	12,161	4.01%
Aleksandr Shorenko	Liberal Democratic Party	8,759	2.89%
Igor Lyutov	Yavlinsky—Boldyrev—Lukin	8,324	2.75%
against all		42,227	13.93%
Total		303,130	100%

=== 1995 ===
Summary of the 17 December 1995 Russian legislative election in the Rostov constituency
Candidate	Party	Votes	%
Mikhail Yemelyanov	Yabloko	96,001	35.20%
Gennady Serdyukov	Communist Party	49,712	18.23%
Nikolay Khachaturov	Independent	13,818	5.07%
Viktor Goncharov	Independent	9,627	3.53%
Vladimir Zubkov	Independent	9,540	3.50%
Vladimir Kalinko	Congress of Russian Communities	9,161	3.36%
Aleksandr Kokorev	Liberal Democratic Party	8,916	3.27%
Natalya Serdyukova	Ivan Rybkin Bloc	7,467	2.74%
Aleksandr Rodin	Party of Workers' Self-Government	6,429	2.36%
Aleksandr Tolmachev	Independent	5,812	2.13%
Yevgenia Vostrova	Party of Russian Unity and Accord	5,442	2.00%
Yevgeny Nikitin	Russian All-People's Movement	4,627	1.70%
Grigory Abaziyev	Independent	3,933	1.44%
Simon Sekizyan	Education — Future of Russia	2,752	1.01%
Aleksandr Kabanov	Independent	2,689	0.99%
Pyotr Bystrov	Independent	2,518	0.92%
Anzhela Khachaturyan	Stable Russia	2,417	0.89%
Aleksandr Zurnadzhiyev	Party of Tax Cuts' Supporters	1,727	0.63%
against all		22,539	8.26%
Total		272,744	100%

=== 1999 ===
Summary of the 19 December 1999 Russian legislative election in the Rostov constituency
Candidate	Party	Votes	%
Mikhail Yemelyanov (incumbent)	Yabloko	123,633	45.65%
Vyacheslav Antokhin	Communist Party	73,484	27.14%
Boris Sturov	Movement in Support of the Army	17,764	6.56%
Vasily Gatashov	Spiritual Heritage	5,985	2.21%
Leonid Troyko	Independent	3,301	1.22%
against all		40,992	15.14%
Total		270,802	100%

=== 2003 ===
Summary of the 7 December 2003 Russian legislative election in the Rostov constituency
Candidate	Party	Votes	%
Mikhail Yemelyanov (incumbent)	Yabloko	99,678	43.84%
Vladimir Bessonov	Communist Party	47,951	21.09%
Viktor Chernov	Great Russia – Eurasian Union	9,553	4.20%
Marat Zainalabidov	Liberal Democratic Party	8,835	3.89%
Boris Sturov	Independent	7,276	3.20%
Oleg Pobegaylov	Russian Party of Labour	3,258	1.43%
Albert Zaripov	Independent	2,560	1.13%
Aleksandr Kryuchkov	United Russian Party Rus'	2,419	1.06%
Aleksey Pelipenko	Independent	1,391	0.61%
Yury Netrebov	Independent	1,298	0.57%
against all		39,240	17.26%
Total		228,444	100%

=== 2016 ===
Summary of the 18 September 2016 Russian legislative election in the Rostov constituency
Candidate	Party	Votes	%
Larisa Tutova	United Russia	161,402	68.80%
Grigory Fomenko	Communist Party	21,251	9.06%
Sergey Ivanov	Liberal Democratic Party	19,308	8.23%
Anatoly Kotlyarov	A Just Russia	9,408	4.01%
Pavel Volkov	Communists of Russia	8,369	3.57%
Aleksandr Musiyenko	Yabloko	3,870	1.65%
Stanislav Krylov	Party of Growth	2,301	0.98%
Sergey Novikov	The Greens	2,154	0.92%
Vyacheslav Voloshchuk	Civic Platform	1,783	0.76%
Total		234,576	100%

=== 2021 ===
Summary of the 17-19 September 2021 Russian legislative election in the Rostov constituency
Candidate	Party	Votes	%
Larisa Tutova (incumbent)	United Russia	100,995	51.09%
Lavr Cherkashin	Communist Party	32,720	16.55%
Yevgeny Sutormin	Communists of Russia	12,626	6.39%
Nikita Rykovsky	Liberal Democratic Party	10,489	5.31%
Vladislav Makhmudov	New People	9,140	4.62%
Valentin Dzhagatsbanyan	A Just Russia — For Truth	8,676	4.39%
Anatoly Kotlyarov	Rodina	6,819	3.45%
Vladimir Tokarev	Russian Party of Freedom and Justice	5,382	2.72%
Tatyana Sporysheva	Yabloko	4,221	2.14%
Total		197,663	100%

=== 2026 ===
Summary of the 18-20 September 2026 Russian legislative election in the Rostov constituency
Candidate	Party	Votes	%
Dmitry Sizyakin	United Russia	194,802	55.81%
Aleksandr Chukhlebov	New People	51,265	14.69%
Lavr Cherkashin	Communist Party	46,827	13.42%
Natalya Belousova	A Just Russia	26,695	7.65%
Taras Sinonyan	Liberal Democratic Party	18,915	5.42%
Andrey Sheludko	Communists of Russia	8,357	2.39%
Total		349,051	100%
