= Bataysk constituency =

Legislative constituency in Russia

Bataysk single-member constituency
- Constituency of the Russian State Duma
- Deputy: Sergey Rozhkov; United Russia
- Federal subject: Rostov Oblast
- Districts: Azov, Azovsky, Bataysk, Kagalnitsky, Orlovsky, Peschanokopsky, Proletarsky, Salsky, Tselinsky, Vesyolovsky, Yegorlyksky, Zernogradsky
- Voters: 515,813 (2026)

The Bataysk constituency (No.152 (Note: Nizhnedonskoy constituency No.150 in 2016–2026)) is a Russian legislative constituency in Rostov Oblast. The constituency covers southern Rostov Oblast, stretching from Azov to rural south-central Rostov Oblast.

The constituency has been represented since 2026 by United Russia deputy Sergey Rozhkov, former Member of Legislative Assembly of Rostov Oblast and construction businessman, who won the open seat, succeeding two-term United Russia incumbent Anton Getta.

== Boundaries ==
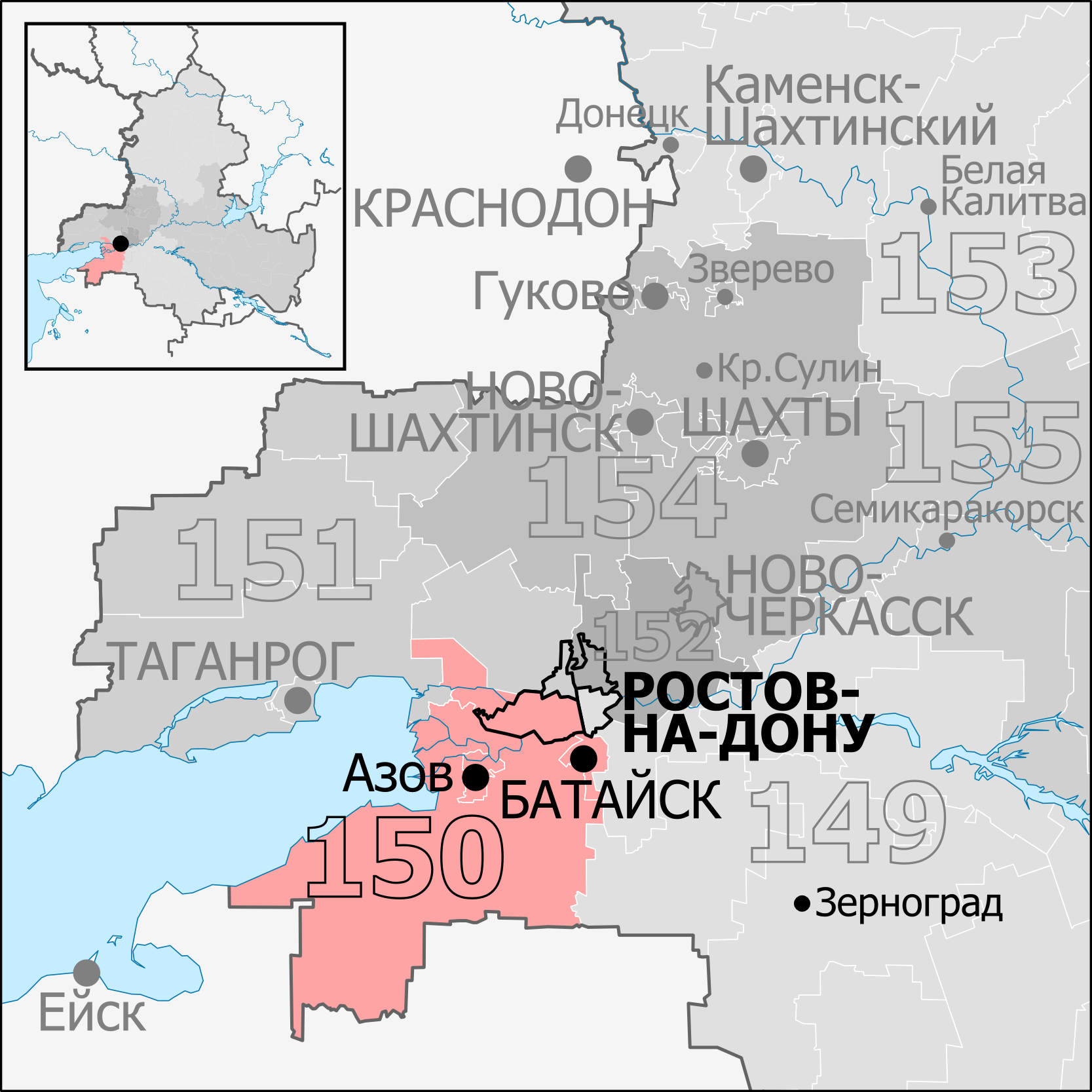
Constituency boundaries from 2016 to 2026

2016–2026 Nizhnedonskoy constituency: Azov, Azovsky District, Bataysk, Myasnikovsky District (Kalininskoye, Nedvigovskoye), Rostov-on-Don (Leninsky, Sovetsky, Zheleznodorozhny)
The constituency was created for the 2016 election, taking western Rostov-on-Don and parts of Myasnikovsky District from the former Rostov constituency as well as south-western Rostov Oblast, including Azov, from Taganrog constituency and Bataysk from Proletarsky constituency.

2026–present: Azov, Azovsky District, Bataysk, Kagalnitsky District, Orlovsky District, Peschanokopsky District, Proletarsky District, Salsky District, Tselinsky District, Vesyolovsky District, Yegorlyksky District, Zernogradsky District
Following the 2025 redistricting Rostov Oblast lost one of its seven constituencies, so all the remaining seats saw major changes. The constituency took the name "Bataysk constituency" and lost its portion of Rostov-on-Don to Rostov constituency, shedding the rest of Myasnikovsky District to Neklinovsky constituency. This seat was pushed to rural southern Rostov Oblast, gaining vast territories to its east from Rostov and Volgodonsk constituencies.

== Members elected ==
Election	Member	Party
2016	Mikhail Yemelyanov	A Just Russia
2021	Anton Getta	United Russia
2026	Sergey Rozhkov	United Russia

== Election results ==
=== 2016 ===
Summary of the 18 September 2016 Russian legislative election in the Nizhnedonskoy constituency
Candidate	Party	Votes	%
Mikhail Yemelyanov	A Just Russia	139,095	57.43%
Yevgeny Bessonov	Communist Party	41,439	17.11%
Igor Teperechkin	Liberal Democratic Party	23,823	9.84%
Andrey Sklyarov	Yabloko	6,841	2.82%
Aleksey Pelipenko	Communists of Russia	6,836	2.82%
Dmitry Velichko	Party of Growth	6,783	2.80%
Aleksey Dudarev	Rodina	6,685	2.76%
Yury Kolobrodov	Patriots of Russia	4,604	1.90%
Total		242,200	100%

=== 2021 ===
Summary of the 17-19 September 2021 Russian legislative election in the Nizhnedonskoy constituency
Candidate	Party	Votes	%
Anton Getta	United Russia	73,426	35.36%
Mikhail Yemelyanov (incumbent)	A Just Russia — For Truth	40,268	19.39%
Stanislav Potakov	Communist Party	33,031	15.91%
Yevgeny Fedyayev	Liberal Democratic Party	17,444	8.40%
Vladislav Madykin	New People	10,400	5.01%
Nadezhda Korteleva	Party of Pensioners	9,871	4.75%
Yevgeny Pykhonin	Communists of Russia	5,367	2.58%
Dmitry Velichko	Party of Growth	5,144	2.48%
Aleksandr Ryabchuk	Yabloko	3,691	1.78%
Andrey Tyurin	Rodina	3,658	1.76%
Total		207,657	100%

=== 2026 ===
Summary of the 18-20 September 2026 Russian legislative election in the Bataysk constituency
Candidate	Party	Votes	%
Sergey Rozhkov	United Russia	189,451	57.08%
Aleksandr Dedovich	Communist Party	46,016	13.86%
Maksim Chumakov	Liberal Democratic Party	30,582	9.21%
Igor Simakov	New People	25,901	7.80%
Oleg Shuvalov	A Just Russia	14,056	4.23%
Vasily Prikhodko	Party of Pensioners	11,407	3.44%
Sergey Koshevoy	Yabloko	10,918	3.29%
Total		331,916	100%
