= Kuleshovka =

Kuleshovka (Russian: Кулешовка) is the name of several rural localities in Russia:

- Kuleshovka, Belgorod Oblast, a selo in Krasnogvardeysky District of Belgorod Oblast
- Kuleshovka, Babyninsky District, Kaluga Oblast, a village in Babyninsky District of Kaluga Oblast
- Kuleshovka, Kozelsky District, Kaluga Oblast, a village in Kozelsky District of Kaluga Oblast
- Kuleshovka, Sukhinichsky District, Kaluga Oblast, a village in Sukhinichsky District of Kaluga Oblast
- Kuleshovka, Krasnodar Krai, a selo in Novopavlovsky Rural Okrug of Beloglinsky District of Krasnodar Krai
- Kuleshovka, Kursk Oblast, a village in Blagodatensky Selsoviet of Korenevsky District of Kursk Oblast
- Kuleshovka, Lipetsk Oblast, a village in Kosyrevsky Selsoviet of Lipetsky District of Lipetsk Oblast
- Kuleshovka, Oryol Oblast, a village in Stanovo-Kolodezsky Selsoviet of Orlovsky District of Oryol Oblast
- Kuleshovka, Rostov Oblast, a selo in Kuleshovskoye Rural Settlement of Azovsky District of Rostov Oblast
- Kuleshovka, Samara Oblast, a selo in Neftegorsky District of Samara Oblast
- Kuleshovka, Smolensk Oblast, a village in Vysokovskoye Rural Settlement of Novoduginsky District of Smolensk Oblast
- Kuleshovka, Abakumovsky Selsoviet, Tokaryovsky District, Tambov Oblast, a village in Abakumovsky Selsoviet of Tokaryovsky District of Tambov Oblast
- Kuleshovka, Sergiyevsky Selsoviet, Tokaryovsky District, Tambov Oblast, a village in Sergiyevsky Selsoviet of Tokaryovsky District of Tambov Oblast
- Kuleshovka, Podgorensky District, Voronezh Oblast, a selo in Sergeyevskoye Rural Settlement of Podgorensky District of Voronezh Oblast
- Kuleshovka, Ramonsky District, Voronezh Oblast, a village in Gorozhanskoye Rural Settlement of Ramonsky District of Voronezh Oblast
