= Dubovsky (rural locality) =

Dubovsky (Russian: Дубовский) or Dubovskoy (Дубовской; both masculine), Dubovskaya (Дубовская; feminine), or Dubovskoye (Дубовское; neuter) is the name of several rural localities in Russia.

== Modern localities ==
- Dubovsky, Chuvash Republic, a settlement in Alikovskoye Rural Settlement of Alikovsky District in the Chuvash Republic; 55°46′N 46°49′E
- Dubovsky, Mari El Republic, a settlement in Ardinsky Rural Okrug of Kilemarsky District in the Mari El Republic; 56°21′N 46°48′E
- Dubovsky, Kumylzhensky District, Volgograd Oblast, a khutor in Shakinsky Selsoviet of Kumylzhensky District in Volgograd Oblast
- Dubovsky, Uryupinsky District, Volgograd Oblast, a khutor in Dubovsky Selsoviet of Uryupinsky District in Volgograd Oblast
- Dubovskoye, Primorsky Krai, a selo in Spassky District of Primorsky Krai
- Dubovskoye, Rostov Oblast, a selo in Dubovskoye Rural Settlement of Dubovsky District in Rostov Oblast; 47°24′N 42°46′E
- Dubovskaya, Chechen Republic, a stanitsa in Dubovskaya Rural Administration of Shelkovskoy District in the Chechen Republic
- Dubovskaya, Republic of Karelia, a village in Pudozhsky District of the Republic of Karelia

== Alternative names ==
- Dubovsky, alternative name of Dubovskaya I, a village in Matvinursky Rural Okrug of Sanchursky District in Kirov Oblast; 57°02′N 47°35′E
- Dubovsky/Dubovskoy, alternative names of Dubovoy, a khutor in Bokovskoye Rural Settlement of Bokovsky District in Rostov Oblast; 49°24′N 42°02′E
- Dubovsky, alternative name of Dubrovsky, a khutor in Dubrovskoye Rural Settlement of Sholokhovsky District in Rostov Oblast; 49°42′N 41°38′E
