= Rodionovo-Nesvetaysky =

Rodionovo-Nesvetaysky (masculine), Rodionovo-Nesvetayskaya (feminine), or Rodionovo-Nesvetayskoye (neuter) may refer to:

- Rodionovo-Nesvetaysky District, a district of Rostov Oblast, Russia
- Rodionovo-Nesvetayskaya, a rural locality (a sloboda) in Rostov Oblast, Russia
