= Peschanokopsky =

Peschanokopsky (masculine), Peschanokopskaya (feminine), or Peschanokopskoye (neuter) may refer to:

- Peschanokopsky District, a district of Rostov Oblast, Russia
- Peschanokopskoye, a rural locality (a selo) in Rostov Oblast, Russia
