= Kagalnitsky =

Kagalnitsky (masculine), Kagalnitskaya (feminine), or Kagalnitskoye (neuter) may refer to:

- Kagalnitsky District, a district of Rostov Oblast, Russia
- Kagalnitskaya, a rural locality (a stanitsa) in Rostov Oblast, Russia
