= Kashary =

Set index of articles associated with the same name

Kashary (Russian: Кашары) is the name of several rural localities in Russia:

- Kashary, Belgorod Oblast, a khutor in Gubkinsky District of Belgorod Oblast
- Kashary, Lipetsk Oblast, a selo in Kasharsky Selsoviet of Zadonsky District of Lipetsk Oblast
- Kashary, Rostov Oblast, a sloboda in Kasharskoye Rural Settlement of Kasharsky District of Rostov Oblast
