= Yegorlyksky =

Yegorlyksky (masculine), Yegorlykskaya (feminine), or Yegorlykskoye (neuter) may refer to:

- Yegorlyksky District, a district of Rostov Oblast, Russia
- Yegorlykskaya, a rural locality (a stanitsa) in Yegorlyksky District of Rostov Oblast, Russia
