= 2009 Rostov-on-Don bus crash =

Fatal road accident in Russia

Rostov bus crash

Details
- Date: 24 July 2009 12:48
- Location: M4 highway - Samarskoye near Rostov-on-Don
- Country: Russia

Statistics
- Deaths: 21
- Injured: 8 (seriously)

The 2009 Rostov bus crash was a collision between a bus and a Mercedes-Benz Actros 1841LS oil tanker near Samarskoye village, Azovsky District, Rostov Oblast, Russia. 21 people died, and 8 others were injured.

== Incident ==
24 July 2009 at 12:48 Moscow Time on 1107 kilometer of M4 highway (near Elbuzd hamlet, Azovsky District, Rostov Oblast) Ikarus 250 bus with 28 passengers was on regular route Kurganinsk — Taganrog — Rostov-on-Don and collided head on with empty Mercedes-Benz Actros 1841LS oil tanker which had crossed the median strip. The drivers of both vehicles were killed. The accident happened at 12:48. 21 people were killed in the crash. 8 people were in a serious condition in hospital.

=== Route ===
The bus was on the highway route between Krasnodar and Volgodonsk. The bus had come from the town of Kurgantsy, heading towards Taganrog. The truck had crossed into the opposing lane and collided with the Ikarus 256.75 bus.

== Investigation ==
The Ministry of Emergency Situations for the Rostov Oblast said there had been 27 passengers on board the bus. The bus had a capacity to take 45 people. An investigation was opened for the crash.
