= Zernogradsky =

Zernogradsky (masculine), Zernogradskaya (feminine), or Zernogradskoye (neuter) may refer to:

- Zernogradsky District, a district in Rostov Oblast, Russia
- Zernogradskoye Urban Settlement, an administrative division and a municipal formation which the town of Zernograd in Zernogradsky District of Rostov Oblast, Russia is incorporated as
