= Nikolai Sorokin =

Russian actor (1952–2013)

- Born: Nikolai Evgenievich Sorokin; 15 February 1952; Cossack Hutor Vesyolovsky District, Rostov Oblast, Soviet Union
- Died: 26 March 2013 (aged 61); Rostov-on-Don, Russian Federation
- Occupations: actor, Theatre director
- Years active: 1975-2013
- Spouse: Tamara Aleksandrovna Sorokina
- Children: Alina Sorokina

Nikolai Evgenievich Sorokin (Russian: Николай Евгеньевич Сорокин; February 15, 1952 – March 26, 2013) was a Russian theatre and film actor, theatre director, educator, and People's Artist of Russia (1999). He was artistic director of the Rostov-on-Don academic drama theatre of a name Maxim Gorky and a deputy of the State Duma of the 3rd convocation.

== Biography ==
Nikolai Sorokin was born on February 15, 1952, in the Hutor Cossack Vesyolovsky District of Rostov Region, Russian's territory.
In 1975 he graduated from the Rostov art school (teacher of actor skill People's Artist of the USSR Mikhail Bushnov) and went to work in the Rostov drama theatre.
In 1984, Nikolai studied in Moscow, he graduated from the actor faculty of GITIS (teacher of actor skill People's Artist of the USSR Elina Bystritskaya).
In 1996, Nikolai Sorokin was appointed artistic director of the Rostov academic drama theatre of a name Maxim Gorky.
From 1999 to 2003 — Deputy of the State Duma of the Russian Federation of the third convocation (vice-Chairperson of the committee on culture and tourism), a member of the political party United Russia.
Since 2004, he was engaged in teaching activity. Professor of the Rostov branch of the St. Petersburg University of culture and arts, released two actors rate.
Nikolai Sorokin has worked at the Rostov theatre of drama about forty years. As an actor has created a lot of different images, as a director staged many performances in his native Rostov theatre, also worked abroad.

Nikolai Sorokin died after a long illness on March 26, 2013.

== Recognition and awards ==
- Honored Artist of the RSFSR (1988)
- People's Artist of Russia (1999)
- Order of Friendship (1996)
- Medal of the Order of Merit for the Fatherland, 2nd class (2002)
- The Grand-Prix of the festival, prize for the original setting and the reading of the drama of Mikhail Sholokhov in the 21st century — performance «The Destiny of man» (2005 — All-Russian theatrical festival «The Stars of the Victory», Ryazan)
- The Premium of the name of Nikolay Akimov for the original setting — performance «The Cherry Orchard» (2010 — IV All-Russian theatrical festival «Russian Comedy», Rostov-on-Don)
- Order of Merit in the Rostov Region (2012)
