= Denis Kalinin =

Russian robber and serial killer (born 1980)

- Born: Denis Sergeevich Kalinin; 1980 (age 45–46); Pskov, Russian SFSR, Soviet Union
- Other name: "The Salesman Maniac"
- Conviction: Murder
- Penalty: 19 years imprisonment

Details
- Victims: 14
- Span of crimes: September – November 2005
- Country: Russia
- States: Pskov, Chuvashia, Rostov
- Date apprehended: 2012

Denis Sergeevich Kalinin (Russian: Дени́с Сергеевич Кали́нин; born 1980), known as The Salesman Maniac (Russian: Маньяк-коммивояжёр), is a Russian robber and serial killer. Between September and October 2005, using his salesman job as a ruse, he killed 14 pensioners in Pskov, Chuvashia and most notably the Rostov Oblast, stealing their belongings afterwards.

== Early life and murders ==
Denis Kalinin was born in Pskov in 1980. Unemployed at age 24, he supported himself through minor thefts, wasting it mostly on slot machines, alcohol and drugs. At some point, he decided to kill pensioners during the robberies.

He committed his first murder in his hometown of Pskov, on 20 September, killing a 93-year-old woman, before moving to Rostov-on-Don. Kalinin got a job as a salesman to commit his crimes, choosing lonely elderly people as victims, as their children and grandchildren often lived far away. He managed to sell a wide variety of electrical household appliances to the pensioners, which, for the most part, were unnecessary. To the first victim, he sold an electric kettle for 1,500 rubles, and to another man, who was almost 100 years old, he gave an electric massager.

Kalinin, on the other hand, easily managed to gain the trust of the naive pensioners. Moreover, it was rather important for him to communicate with them, as they willingly gave the young man money for the unnecessary house appliances. They especially agreed to the purchase when they were told by Kalinin that he would drop by again, in case they needed assistance with the product or couldn't understand the instructions properly. Those repeated visits by Kalinin ended in murder. To confuse law enforcement, he operated in different cities: starting in Pskov, he committed additional murders in Cheboksary, Rostov-on-Don, Morozovsk, Tsimlyansk, Aksay, Bataysk and finally Zimovniki. After killing an elderly man in Morozovsk, where everyone knew each other, it became clear that a killer was operating in the area, penetrating through the houses of the elderly. However, there were no signs of forced entry, indicating that the pensioners themselves let the killer into their homes.

== Arrest and sentence ==
The killings stopped abruptly, but a female pensioner in the Rostov Oblast became an accidental victim of a drunken row - for which, the cold case of the "Salesman Maniac" was reopened, just in case. At the end of 2012, it turned out that there were enough fingerprints left, and that they could be used to track down the killer. It turned out to be an average-looking man named Denis Kalinin, who was serving an 8-year sentence for robbery. He immediately admitted everything, explaining how and why he killed the pensioners. Kalinin also confided that he drank before each murder to calm down his nerves. He gave the following reasoning as a motive:

I robbed them because they could not resist. They had money, they saved for a rainy day.

An employee of the company which Kalinin worked at also recalled one interesting conversation with him:

He appeared to be an ordinary person, inconspicuous. But once he said something like: "The old man annoys me. Shuffling, gray hair. You need to live up to 45, a maximum of 50, and then why? It's necessary to concede life to the young".

On 14 March 2014, for the murders of the 14 pensioners, Kalinin was sentenced by the Morozovsk Court of the Rostov Oblast to 19 years imprisonment.

== See also ==
- List of Russian serial killers
