= Abrikosovy =

Abrikosovy Абрикосовый
- Settlement
- Location within Rostov Oblast Location within Russia
- Coordinates: 47°24′N 41°15′E
- Country: Russia
- Region: Rostov Oblast
- District: Martynovsky District
- Time zone: UTC+3:00

Abrikosovy (Russian: Абрикосовый) is a rural locality (a settlement) in Zelenolugskoye Rural Settlement of Martynovsky District, Rostov Oblast, Russia. The population of Abrikosovyy was 427 as of 2010. There are 8 streets.

== Geography ==
Abrikosovy is located 43 km northwest of Bolshaya Martynovka (the district's administrative centre) by road. Zelenolugsky is the nearest rural locality.
