= 1st Rossoshinskiy =

1st Rossoshinskiy 1-й Россошинский
- Khutor
- Location within Rostov Oblast Location within Russia
- Coordinates: 46.681111°N 40.341111°E
- Country: Russia
- Region: Rostov Oblast
- District: Zernogradsky District
- Time zone: UTC+03:00

1st Rossoshinskiy (Russian: 1-й Россошинский) is a rural locality (a khutor) and the administrative center of Rossoshinskoye Rural Settlement of Zernogradsky District, Russia. The population was 911 as of 2010.

== Geography ==
The khutor is located on the Sredny Elbuzd River, 18 km from Zernograd.

== Streets ==
- Donskaya
- Zarechnaya
- Molodezhnaya
- Savovaya
- Stepnaya

== Geography ==
1st Rossoshinskiy is located 35 km south of Zernograd (the district's administrative centre) by road. Krayny is the nearest rural locality.
