= Dubovsky =

Dubovsky (masculine), Dubovksa/Dubovskaya (feminine), or Dubovskoye (neuter) may refer to:

- Martina Dubovská (born 1992), Czech-Slovak alpine ski racer
- Dubovsky District, name of several districts in Russia
- Dubovsky (rural locality) (Dubovskaya, Dubovskoye), name of several rural localities in Russia
- Peter Dubovský (footballer) (1972–2000), Slovak footballer
- Peter Dubovský (bishop), SJ, (1921–2008), Slovak Roman Catholic prelate, Auxiliary Bishop of Banská Bystrica (1991–1997)

== See also ==
- Dubovka
