= Zernograd Air Base =

Airbase in Rostov Oblast, Russia

Zernograd
- Зерноград
- Zernograd, Rostov Oblast in Russia
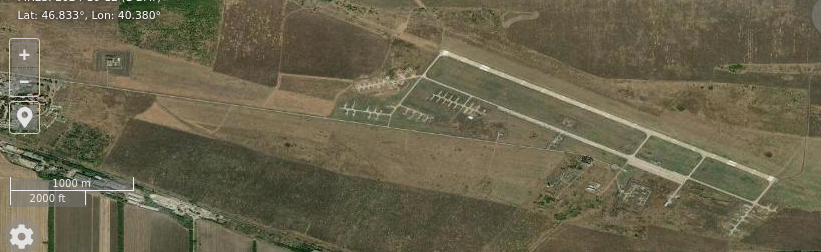
- Satellite imagery of Zernograd air base

Site information
- Type: Air Base
- Owner: Ministry of Defence
- Operator: Russian Aerospace Forces
- Controlled by: 4th Air and Air Defence Forces Army

Location
- Shown within Rostov Oblast Zernograd (Russia)
- Coordinates: 46°50′01″N 40°22′48″E

Site history
- Built: 1969
- In use: 1969 - present

Airfield information
- Identifiers: ICAO: URRG
- Elevation: 89 metres (292 ft) AMSL
Runways
Direction	Length and surface
11/29	2,500 metres (8,202 ft) Concrete

Zernograd is an airbase of the Russian Aerospace Forces in Zernograd, Rostov Oblast, Russia.

The base is home to the 16th Army Aviation Brigade.

106th Training Aviation Regiment between 1969 and 1995.

286th independent Helicopter Squadron for Electronic Warfare between 1992 and 1998.

== See also ==
- List of military airbases in Russia
