= Baklanovsky =

Baklanovsky (Russian: Баклановский; masculine), Baklanovskaya (Баклановская; feminine), or Baklanovskoye (Баклановское; neuter) is the name of several rural localities in Russia:

- Baklanovsky (rural locality), a khutor in Kulikovsky Selsoviet of Novonikolayevsky District of Volgograd Oblast
- Baklanovskaya, Rostov Oblast, a stanitsa in Maloluchenskoye Rural Settlement of Dubovsky District of Rostov Oblast
- Baklanovskaya, Stavropol Krai, a stanitsa in Izobilnensky District of Stavropol Krai
- Baklanovskaya, Markushevsky Selsoviet, Tarnogsky District, Vologda Oblast, a village in Markushevsky Selsoviet of Tarnogsky District of Vologda Oblast
- Baklanovskaya, Ozeretsky Selsoviet, Tarnogsky District, Vologda Oblast, a village in Ozeretsky Selsoviet of Tarnogsky District of Vologda Oblast
