= Larisa Tutova =

Russian politician

- Лариса Тутова
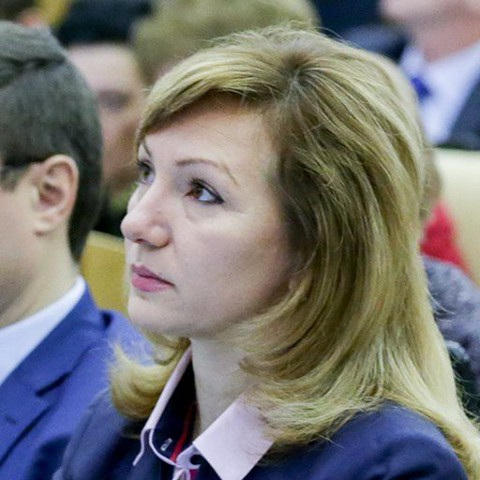

Member of the State Duma for Rostov Oblast
- Incumbent
- Assumed office 5 October 2016
- Preceded by: constituency re-established
- Constituency: Rostov (No. 149)

Personal details
- Born: 18 October 1969 (age 56) Peschanokopskoye, Rostov Oblast, RSFSR, USSR
- Party: United Russia
- Education: Southern Federal University

Larisa Nikolaevna Tutova (Russian: Лариса Николаевна Тутова; born 18 October 1969, Peschanokopskoye, Rostov Oblast) is a Russian political figure and a deputy of 7th and 8th State Dumas.

From 1991 to 2010, Tutova taught history and social studies at the secondary school in Peschanokopskoye. In 2011, she was appointed the director of the school. From 2013 to 2016, she was the deputy of the Legislative Assembly of the Rostov Oblast. In 2016, she was elected deputy of the 7th State Duma from the Rostov constituency. Since September 2021, she has served as deputy of the 8th State Duma.
