= 2nd Rossoshinskiy =

2nd Rossoshinskiy 2-й Россошинский
- Khutor
- Location within Rostov Oblast Location within Russia
- Coordinates: 46.693889°N 40.199444°E
- Country: Russia
- Region: Rostov Oblast
- District: Zernogradsky District
- Time zone: UTC+03:00

2nd Rossoshinskiy (Russian: 2-й Россошинский) is a rural locality (a khutor) in Rossoshinskoye Rural Settlement of Zernogradsky District, Russia. The population was 203 as of 2010.

== Streets ==
- Mira

== Geography ==
2nd Rossoshinskiy is located 42 km southwest of Zernograd (the district's administrative centre) by road. 1st Rossoshinskiy is the nearest rural locality.
