= Gaidamachka =

Gaidamachka Гайдамачка
- Location of Rostov Oblast in Russia
- Country: Russia
- Economic Region: North Caucasus
- Federal District: South
- Federal Subject: Russia
- Raion: Yegorlyksky
- Elevation: 77 m (253 ft)
- Time zone: UTC+03:00 (MSK)
- Postal code: 347684
- Dialing code: + 7 86370

Gaidamachka from Russian Гайдамачка is a khutor in Yegorlyksky District, Rostov Oblast, Russia. It is located on the banks of the Gaidamachka, a left-bank tributary of the Kugo-Yeya, itself a tributary of the Yeya, 23 km southwest of Yegorlykskaya and 103 km southeast of Rostov-on-Don, the capital of the oblast.

The village is part of the Balko-Gruzskoye rural settlement.

== External links and references ==
- This article contains geographical data extracted from Google Earth and the Russian map of Yandex.ru, accessible from the links of.
- This article is a partial translation of its corresponding in the Russian edition of Wikipedia, Гайдамачка (хутор).
