= Persianovka =

Persianovka Персиановка
- Khutor
- Location within Rostov Oblast Location within Russia
- Coordinates: 47°31′47″N 39°25′6″E
- Country: Russia
- Region: Rostov Oblast
- District: Rodionovo-Nesvetaysky District
- Time zone: UTC+3:00

Persianovka (Russian: Персиановка) is a rural locality (a khutor) in Bolshekrepinskoye Rural Settlement of Rodionovo-Nesvetaysky District, the Rostov Oblast, Russia. Population: 29 (2010 census);

== Notable people ==
- Alina Dolgikh, (born 1982) Russian handball world champion
