= Alina Dolgikh =

Russian handball player

Alina Gritsina
Personal information
- Nationality: Russian
- Born: 14 September 1982 (age 44) Persianovka, Soviet Union
- Height: 1.75 m (5 ft 9 in)

Sport
- Sport: Handball
- Position: Left wing

Youth career
- Years: Team
- –2001: Rostov-Don

Senior clubs
- Years: Team
- 2001–2004: Rostov-Don
- 2004–2007: HC Lada Togliatti
- 2007–2010: Rostov-Don
National team
- Years: Team
- –: Russia
Medal record
World Championship
Gold medal – first place	Italy 2001	National Team

Alina Gritsina (Russian: Алина Грицина), (née Dolgikh, 14 September 1982) is a former Russian handball player, who won the World Championship in 2001.

== Club Career ==
Dolgikh made her senior debut for Rostov-Don, where she played until 2004. She then joined HC Lada Togliatti, where she won the Russian Championship in 2005 and 2006. In the 2006-07 season, she reached the final of the EHF Women's Champions League, where HC Lada lost to Danish side Slagelse FH. In 2007 she returned to Rostov-Don, and she retired in 2010.

== National team ==
Dolgikh was part of the Russian team that won the 2001 World Women's Handball Championship, Russia's first title. Two years later represented Russia again at the 2003 World Women's Handball Championship, where Russia finished 7th.
