= Anton Getta =

Russian politician (born 1980)

- Антон Гетта
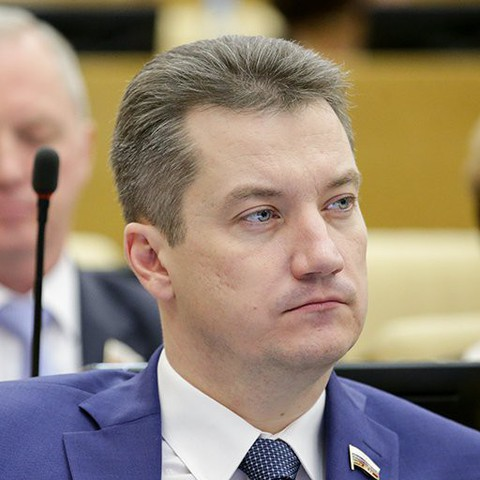

Member of the State Duma for Rostov Oblast
- Incumbent
- Assumed office 12 October 2021
- Preceded by: Mikhail Yemelyanov
- Constituency: Nizhnedonskoy (No. 150)

Member of the State Duma (Party List Seat)
- In office 5 October 2016 – 12 October 2021

Personal details
- Born: 29 April 1980 (age 46) Rostov-on-Don, Russian SFSR, Soviet Union
- Party: United Russia
- Education: Rostov State University of Economics

Anton Alexandrovich Getta (Russian: Антон Александрович Гетта; born 29 April 1980, Rostov-on-Don) is a Russian political figure and a deputy of the 7th and 8th State Dumas.

In 2005 he started his career in public service from the position of the leading specialist in the department of economic development, investment, industrial transport and communications in the administration of Tuapse. From 2008 to 2009, he headed the department of investments and project support of the Krasnodar Krai. In 2009, he moved to Moscow, where he was appointed head of the department of sectoral programs for the development of small and medium-sized enterprises under the department for the development of small and medium-sized businesses of the Ministry of Economic Development. In May 2013, he was assigned Appointed Advisor to the Minister of Transport of the Russian Federation Maksim Sokolov. He also became a member of the All-Russia People's Front, and, from 2013 to 2016, headed the anti-corruption project "For Fair Purchasing". In 2016 he was elected deputy of the 7th State Duma. In 2021, he was re-elected for the 8th State Duma from the Rostov Oblast constituency.

== Awards ==
- Order "For Merit to the Fatherland" (2019)
