= Saak Karapetyan =

Russian deputy attorney general (1960–2018)

Deputy Prosecutor General of the Russian Federation
- In office 2016 – 3 October 2018

Personal details
- Born: Saak Albertovich Karapetyan; 28 March 1960 Sovetsky, Balko-Gruzskoe Rural Settlement, Yegorlyksky District, Rostov Oblast, RSFSR, USSR
- Died: 3 October 2018 (aged 58) Kostroma, Russia
- Party: United Russia

Saak Albertovich Karapetyan (28 March 1960 – 3 October 2018) was a Russian deputy attorney general of Armenian descent. He was killed in a helicopter crash in October 2018 at age 58.

== Biography ==
From 1983 to 1996, Karapetyan was in various positions as a prosecutor of the Rostov region: he started as an intern, reached the head of the department for supervision of the investigation of particularly important cases and operational investigative activities. From 1996 to 2000, he was a State Duma deputy from the Yabloko party, deputy chairman of the security committee.

== Death ==
Karapetyan died when a Eurocopter AS350 Écureuil crashed in Kostroma.
