= Dubovsky District, Rostov Oblast =

Dubovsky District Дубовский район (Russian)
- District
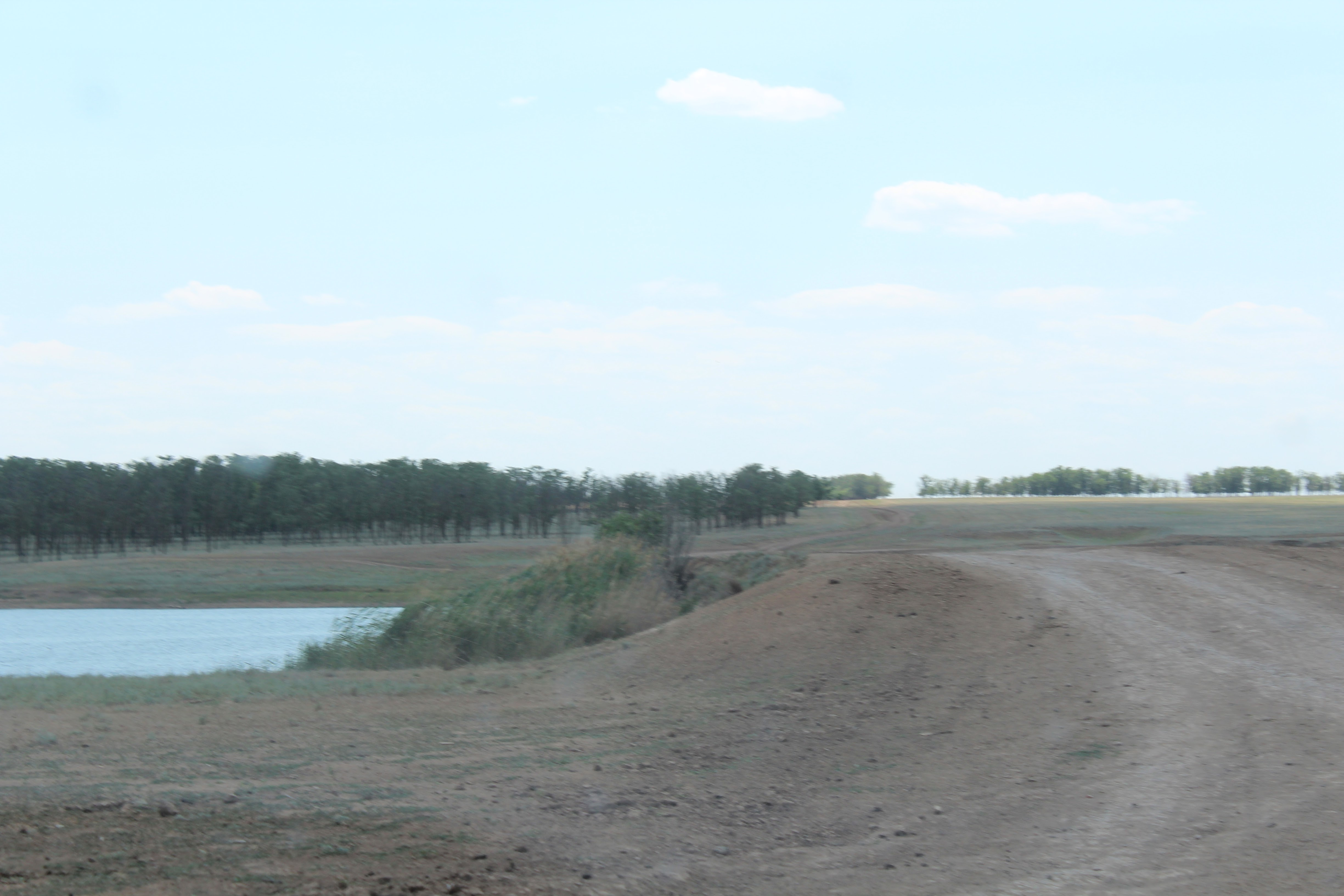
- Landscape of Dubovsky District

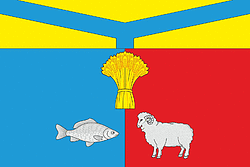
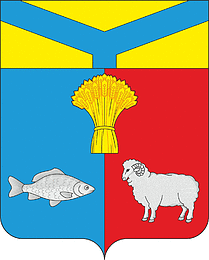
- Flag Coat of arms
- Location of Dubovsky District in Rostov Oblast
- Coordinates: 47°25′N 42°45′E
- Country: Russia
- Federal subject: Rostov Oblast
- Established: 1924 (first), 1965 (second)
- Administrative center: Dubovskoye

Area
  - Total: 3,993.2 km^{2} (1,541.8 sq mi)

Population (2010 Census)
  - Total: 22,983
  - Density: 5.7555/km^{2} (14.907/sq mi)
  - Urban: 0%
  - Rural: 100%

Administrative structure
  - Administrative divisions: 13 Rural settlements
  - Inhabited localities: 50 rural localities

Municipal structure
  - Municipally incorporated as: Dubovsky Municipal District
  - Municipal divisions: 0 urban settlements, 13 rural settlements
- Time zone: UTC+3 (MSK)
- OKTMO ID: 60613000
- Website: http://dubovskoe.donland.ru

Population of Dubovsky District
- 2010 Census: 22,983
- 2002 Census: 24,051
- 1989 Census: 25,371
- 1979 Census: 24,958

Dubovsky District (Russian: Ду́бовский райо́н) is an administrative and municipal district (raion), one of the forty-three in Rostov Oblast, Russia. It is located in the east of the oblast. The area of the district is 3,993.2 square kilometers (1,541.8 sq mi). Its administrative center is the rural locality (a selo) of Dubovskoye. As of the 2010 Census, the total population of the district was 22,983, with the population of Dubovskoye accounting for 37.2% of that number.

== History ==
The district was established in 1924 within Salsky Okrug of South Eastern Krai (Oblast) on the territories of former Ilyinskaya Volost and a part of Atamanskaya Volost. When Rostov Oblast was established in 1937, the district became its part. In 1962–1965, the district was merged into Zimovnikovsky District, but was re-established in modern borders in January 1965.
