= Dubovsky, Uryupinsky District, Volgograd Oblast =

Dubovsky Дубовский
- Khutor
- Location within Volgograd Oblast Location within Russia
- Coordinates: 50°31′N 41°59′E
- Country: Russia
- Region: Volgograd Oblast
- District: Uryupinsky District
- Time zone: UTC+4:00

Dubovsky (Russian: Дубовский) is a rural locality (a khutor) and the administrative center of Dubovskoye Rural Settlement, Uryupinsky District, Volgograd Oblast, Russia. The population was 942 as of 2010. There are 9 streets.

== Geography ==
Dubovsky is located in steppe, 33 km south of Uryupinsk (the district's administrative centre) by road. Golovsky is the nearest rural locality.
