= 25 let Voenkonezavoda =

25 let Voenkonezavoda 25 лет Военконезавода
- Settlement
- Location within Rostov Oblast Location within Russia
- Country: Russia
- Region: Rostov Oblast
- District: Salsky District
- Time zone: UTC+3:00

25 let Voenkonezavoda (Russian: 25 лет Военконезавода) is a rural locality (a settlement) in Budyonnovskoye Rural Settlement of Salsky District, Russia. The population was 109 as of 2010.

== Geography ==
The settlement is located 26 km north of Salsk (the district's administrative centre) by road. Salsky Beslan is the nearest rural locality.

== Streets ==
- Teatralnaya
- Urozhainaya
