= Golovinka, Rostov Oblast =

Rural locality in Rostov Oblast, Russia

Coordinates: 47°24′52″N 39°13′00″E

Golovinka (Russian: Головинка) is a small khutor - a rural locality - in southwest Russia near the border with Ukraine. It is a farming community in the Sovetinskogo rural settlement (Russian: Советинское сельское поселение), in Neklinovsky District of Rostov Oblast. The population is 132 as of the year 2010.

Golovinka hosts Russian Army soldiers as part of the 2014–15 Russian military intervention in Ukraine.

== Geography ==
Golovinka is approximately 59 kilometres (37 mi) northwest of the district capital city Rostov-on-Don, and 18 kilometres (11 mi) north of the Sea of Azov on the Black Sea.
