= Samarskoye, Rostov Oblast =

Samarskoye Самарское
- Selo
- Interactive map of Samarskoye
- Location of Samarskoye Samarskoye (Rostov Oblast)
- Coordinates: 46°56′N 39°41′E
- Country: Russia
- Federal subject: Rostov Oblast
- Administrative district: Azovsky District
- Founded: 1770

Population (2010 Census)
  - Total: 10,530
  - Estimate (2021): 11,015 (+4.6%)
- Time zone: UTC+3 (MSK)
- Postal code: 346751
- OKTMO ID: 60601476101

Samarskoye (Russian: Сама́рское) is a rural locality (a selo) in Azovsky District of Rostov Oblast, Russia, located on the Kagalnik River. Population: 10,530 (2010 census); 10,654 (2002 census).
