= Tselina, Russia =

Tselina Целина
- Settlement
- Interactive map of Tselina
- Location of Tselina Tselina (Rostov Oblast)
- Coordinates: 46°33′N 41°03′E
- Country: Russia
- Federal subject: Rostov Oblast
- Administrative district: Tselinsky District
- Founded: 1916

Population (2010 Census)
  - Total: 10,649
  - Estimate (2021): 9,720 (−8.7%)

Administrative status
  - Capital of: Tselinsky District
- Time zone: UTC+3 (MSK)
- Postal code: 347760
- OKTMO ID: 60656455101

Tselina (Russian: Целина́) is a rural locality (a settlement) and the administrative center of Tselinsky District of Rostov Oblast, Russia. Population: 10,649 (2010 census); 11,092 (2002 census); 12,545 (1989 Soviet census).
