= Dubovsky, Kumylzhensky District, Volgograd Oblast =

Dubovsky Дубовский
- Khutor
- Location within Volgograd Oblast Location within Russia
- Coordinates: 49°48′N 42°03′E
- Country: Russia
- Region: Volgograd Oblast
- District: Kumylzhensky District
- Time zone: UTC+4:00

Dubovsky (Russian: Дубовский) is a rural locality (a khutor) in Shakinskoye Rural Settlement, Kumylzhensky District, Volgograd Oblast, Russia. The population was 23 as of 2010. There is one street.

== Geography ==
Dubovsky is located in forest steppe, on Khopyorsko-Buzulukskaya Plain, on the bank of the Srednyaya Yelan River, 25 km southwest of Kumylzhenskaya (the district's administrative centre) by road. Devkin is the nearest rural locality.
