= Kuleshovka, Podgorensky District, Voronezh Oblast =

Kuleshovka Кулешовка
- Selo
- Location within Voronezh Oblast Location within Russia
- Coordinates: 50°23′N 39°42′E
- Country: Russia
- Region: Voronezh Oblast
- District: Podgorensky District
- Time zone: UTC+3:00

Kuleshovka (Russian: Кулешо́вка) is a rural locality (a selo) in Sergeyevskoye Rural Settlement, Podgorensky District, Voronezh Oblast, Russia. The population was 284 as of 2010. There are 3 streets.

== Geography ==
Kuleshovka is located 8 km southeast of Podgorensky (the district's administrative centre) by road. Golubin is the nearest rural locality.
