= Kuleshovka, Rostov Oblast =

Kuleshovka Кулешовка
- Selo
- Interactive map of Kuleshovka
- Location of Kuleshovka Kuleshovka (Rostov Oblast)
- Coordinates: 47°05′N 39°34′E
- Country: Russia
- Federal subject: Rostov Oblast
- Administrative district: Azovsky District

Population (2010 Census)
  - Total: 13,692
  - Estimate (2021): 14,568 (+6.4%)
- Time zone: UTC+3 (MSK)
- Postal codes: 346779, 346744
- OKTMO ID: 60601448101

Kuleshovka (Russian: Кулешовка) is a rural locality (a selo) in Azovsky District in Rostov Oblast, Russia. Population: 13,692 (2010 census); 14,690 (2002 census).
