= Dubovsky District =

Location of Rostov Oblast in Russia

Location of Volgograd Oblast in Russia

Dubovsky District is the name of several administrative and municipal districts in Russia.

- Dubovsky District, Rostov Oblast, an administrative and municipal district of Rostov Oblast
- Dubovsky District, Volgograd Oblast, an administrative and municipal district of Volgograd Oblast

== See also ==
- Dubovsky (disambiguation)
