= Vesyoly, Vesyolovsky District, Rostov Oblast =

Vesyoly Весёлый
- Posyolok
- Interactive map of Vesyoly
- Location of Vesyoly Vesyoly (Rostov Oblast)
- Coordinates: 47°05′05″N 40°44′15″E
- Country: Russia
- Federal subject: Rostov Oblast
- Administrative district: Vesyolovsky District
- Founded: 1845

Population (2010 Census)
  - Total: 9,175
  - Estimate (2010): 9,175 (0%)
- Time zone: UTC+3 (MSK)
- Postal code: 347780-347781
- OKTMO ID: 60609411101

Vesyoly (Russian: Весёлый) is a rural locality (a posyolok) in Vesyolovsky District of Rostov Oblast, Russia, located 100 kilometers (62 mi) (or 79 kilometers (49 mi) in a straight line) from Rostov-on-Don. Population: 9,175 (2010 census); 8,820 (2002 census).. It is also the administrative center of Vesyolovsky District.

== Geography ==
The settlement is situated on the left bank of Manych River in south-eastern part of Rostov Oblast.

== History ==
Vesyoly khutor was founded in 1845 by Cossacks from the village of Bagaevskaya.

In this year, at the command of Ataman of Bagaevskaya, seven Cossacks were evicted with their families for rebelliousness, and this decision was approved by The Cossack Circle. The settlers were allocated a money share and began to build dugouts. From those seven dugouts, the history of khutor Vesyoly (originally known as Vesyolaya Semiizbyanka or Merry Seven Dugouts) began.

According to 1915 data, the khutor at that time had 300 households and a population of 1998 residents.

During Russian Civil War the area around khutor was a place of fierce fightings. By Spring of 1920, it was taken by forces of Red Army.

In 1935 Vesyolovsky District of Rostov Oblast was established and Vesyoly became its administrative center.

During World War II Vesyoly was occupied by German forces from June 1942 to January 1943.
