= Dubovskoye, Rostov Oblast =

Dubovskoye Дубовское
- Selo
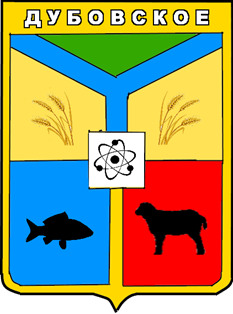
- Coat of arms
- Interactive map of Dubovskoye
- Location of Dubovskoye Dubovskoye (Rostov Oblast)
- Coordinates: 47°24′33″N 42°45′27″E
- Country: Russia
- Federal subject: Rostov Oblast
- Administrative district: Dubovsky District
- Founded: 1786
- Elevation: 49 m (161 ft)

Population (2010 Census)
  - Total: 8,544
  - Estimate (2010): 8,544 (0%)
- Time zone: UTC+3 (MSK)
- Postal code: 347410
- OKTMO ID: 60613425101

Dubovskoye (Russian: Дубовское) is a rural locality (a selo) in Dubovsky District of Rostov Oblast, Russia, located 300 kilometers (190 mi) from Rostov-on-Don. Population: 8,544 (2010 census); 8,031 (2002 census).. It is also the administrative center of Dubovsky District.

== Geography ==
Dubovskoye is situated in the eastern part of Rostov Oblast on the left bank of Sal River, close to the border with Volgograd Oblast. The average altitude above sea level is 49 m.

== History ==
The village was founded in 1786, when cossack captain Alexandr Dubovskov was granted possession of the lands in this area and settled his serfes there.

According to data of 1897 census, Dubovskoye had 51 households and a population of 312 people. In 1915, there already were 294 households and 1,129 people lived there. There was a parish school, two steam-oil mills, two flour mills and a soap factory. In addition, there also were two kerosene-oil depots, two warehouses of agricultural machinery, two forest exchanges, a bread-baking office "Louis-Dreyfus and K *" and seven grain barns.

During the Civil War, the area around village and railway station was a place of fierce fighting. In April 1918 it was captured by Whites and fell to Red Army forces in January 1920. Dubovskoye was briefly occupied by Nazi Germany starting in August 1942, for a few months.
