= Kagalnitskaya =

Kagalnitskaya Кагальницкая
- Stanitsa
- Interactive map of Kagalnitskaya
- Location of Kagalnitskaya Kagalnitskaya (Rostov Oblast)
- Coordinates: 46°52′55″N 40°09′0″E
- Country: Russia
- Federal subject: Rostov Oblast
- Administrative district: Kagalnitsky District
- Founded: 1809

Population (2010 Census)
  - Total: 6,831
  - Estimate (2010): 6,831 (0%)

Administrative status
  - Capital of: Kagalnitsky District
- Time zone: UTC+3 (MSK)
- Postal code: 347700–347701
- OKTMO ID: 60622414101

Kagalnitskaya (Russian: Кагальницкая) is a rural locality (a stanitsa) and the administrative center of Kagalnitsky District of Rostov Oblast, Russia. Population: 6,831 (2010 census); 6,848 (2002 census); 5,983 (1989 Soviet census).
