= Zimovnikovsky District =

Zimovnikovsky District Зимовниковский район (Russian)
- District
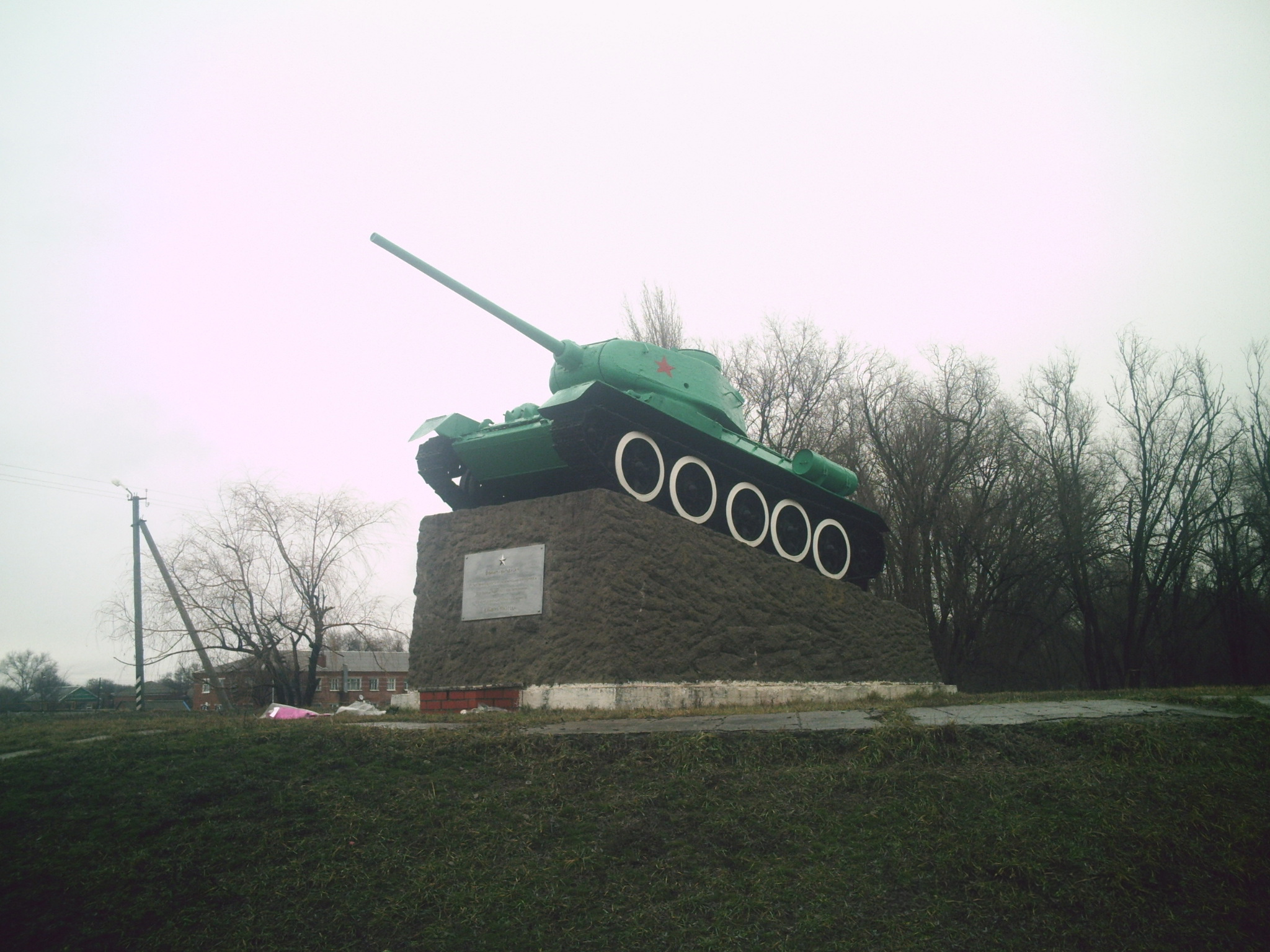
- Tank monument in Zimovniki, Zimnovnikovsky District

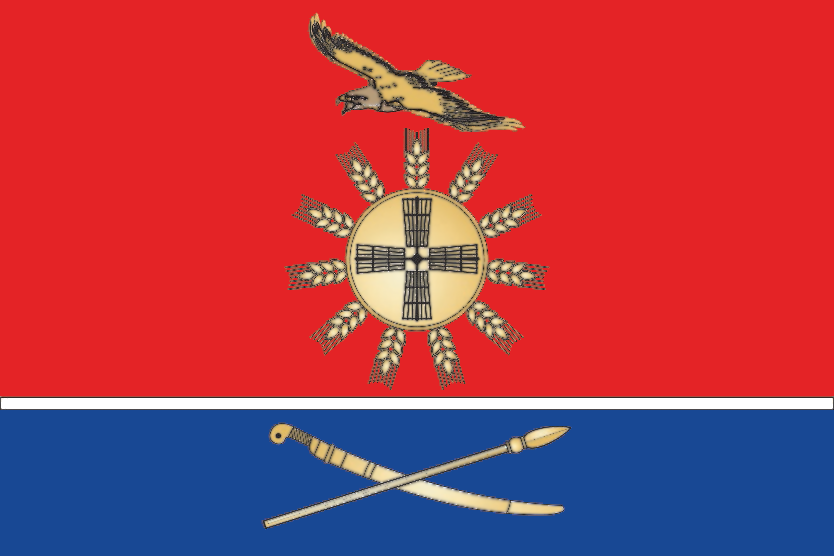
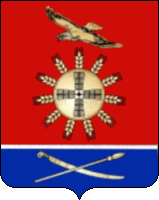
- Flag Coat of arms
- Location of Zimovnikovsky District in Rostov Oblast
- Coordinates: 47°08′42″N 42°28′00″E
- Country: Russia
- Federal subject: Rostov Oblast
- Established: 1924
- Administrative center: Zimovniki

Area
  - Total: 5,228 km^{2} (2,019 sq mi)

Population (2010 Census)
  - Total: 37,092
  - Density: 7.095/km^{2} (18.38/sq mi)
  - Urban: 0%
  - Rural: 100%

Administrative structure
  - Administrative divisions: 11 rural settlement
  - Inhabited localities: 74 rural localities

Municipal structure
  - Municipally incorporated as: Zimovnikovsky Municipal District
  - Municipal divisions: 0 urban settlements, 11 rural settlements
- Time zone: UTC+3 (MSK)
- OKTMO ID: 60619000
- Website: http://www.zimovniki.ru/

Zimovnikovsky District (Russian: Зимовнико́вский райо́н) is an administrative and municipal district (raion), one of the forty-three in Rostov Oblast, Russia. It is located in the southeast of the oblast. The area of the district is 5,228 square kilometers (2,019 sq mi). Its administrative center is the rural locality (a settlement) of Zimovniki. Population: 37,092 (2010 Census); 38,190 (2002 census); 38,854 (1989 Soviet census). The population of Zimovniki accounts for 48.7% of the district's total population.
