= Martynovsky District =

Martynovsky District Мартыновский район (Russian)
- District
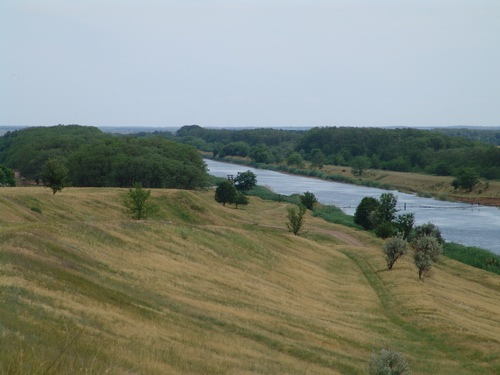
- Landscape in Martynovsky District

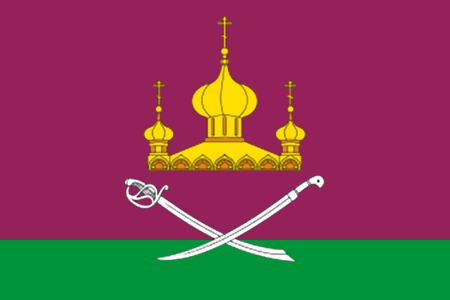
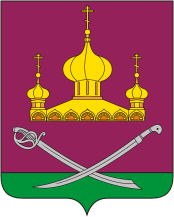
- Flag Coat of arms
- Location of Martynovsky District in Rostov Oblast
- Coordinates: 47°16′35″N 41°40′03″E
- Country: Russia
- Federal subject: Rostov Oblast
- Established: 1935
- Administrative center: Bolshaya Martynovka

Area
  - Total: 1,917 km^{2} (740 sq mi)

Population (2010 Census)
  - Total: 36,545
  - Density: 19.06/km^{2} (49.37/sq mi)
  - Urban: 0%
  - Rural: 100%

Administrative structure
  - Administrative divisions: 9 rural settlement
  - Inhabited localities: 57 rural localities

Municipal structure
  - Municipally incorporated as: Martynovsky Municipal District
  - Municipal divisions: 0 urban settlements, 9 rural settlements
- Time zone: UTC+3 (MSK)
- OKTMO ID: 60630000
- Website: http://martynov.donland.ru/

Martynovsky District (Russian: Мартыновский райо́н) is an administrative and municipal district (raion), one of the forty-three in Rostov Oblast, Russia. It is located in the center of the oblast. The area of the district is 1,917 square kilometers (740 sq mi). Its administrative center is the rural locality (a sloboda) of Bolshaya Martynovka. Population: 36,545 (2010 Census); 40,499 (2002 census); 33,684 (1989 Soviet census). The population of Bolshaya Martynovka accounts for 16.9% of the district's total population.
