= Rodionovo-Nesvetayskaya =

Rural locality in Rostov Oblast, Russia

Coordinates: 47°36′41″N 39°42′39″E

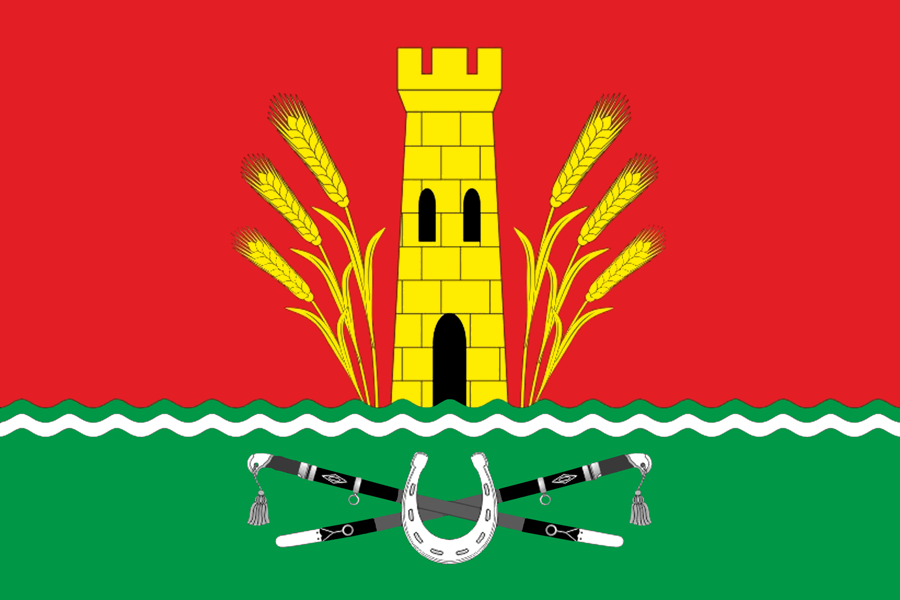
Flag of Rodionovo-Nesvetayskaya

Rodionovo-Nesvetayskaya (Russian: Родионово-Несветайская) is a rural locality (a sloboda) and the administrative center of Rodionovo-Nesvetaysky District, Rostov Oblast, Russia. Population: 6,379 (2010 census); 6,197 (2002 census); 4,957 (1989 Soviet census).
