= Kasharsky District =

Kasharsky District Кашарский район
- District
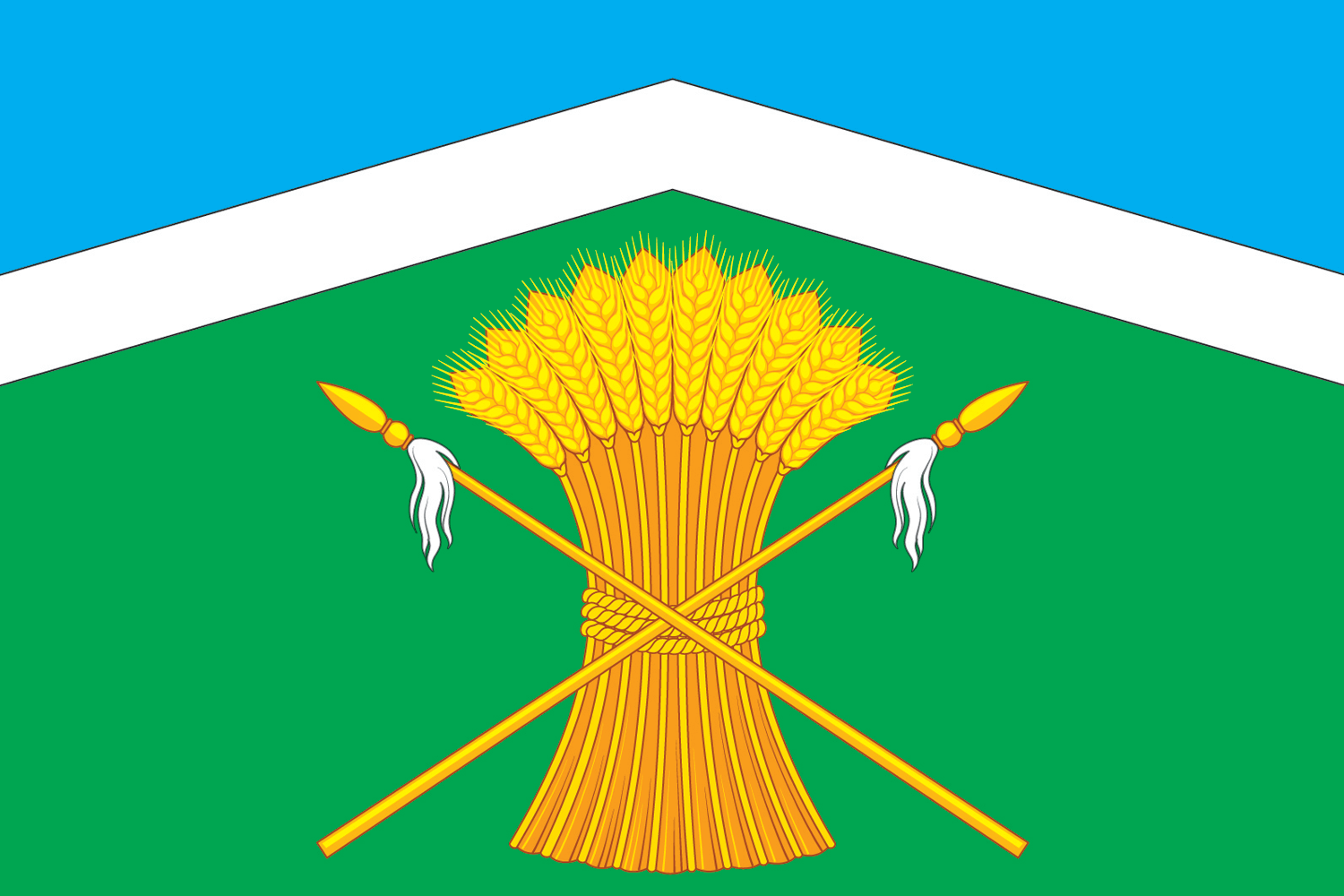
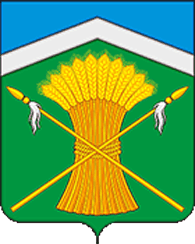
- Flag Coat of arms
- Location of Kasharsky District in Rostov Oblast
- Coordinates: 49°02′25″N 41°00′09″E
- Country: Russia
- Federal subject: Rostov Oblast
- Established: 1924
- Administrative center: Kashary

Area
  - Total: 3,112 km^{2} (1,202 sq mi)

Population (2010 Census)
  - Total: 25,355
  - Density: 8.147/km^{2} (21.10/sq mi)
  - Urban: 0%
  - Rural: 100%

Administrative structure
  - Administrative divisions: 10 rural settlement
  - Inhabited localities: 76 rural localities

Municipal structure
  - Municipally incorporated as: Kasharsky Municipal District
  - Municipal divisions: 0 urban settlements, 10 rural settlements
- Time zone: UTC+3 (MSK)
- OKTMO ID: 60624000
- Website: http://kashadm.donland.ru/

Kasharsky District (Russian: Каша́рский райо́н) is an administrative and municipal district (raion), one of the forty-three in Rostov Oblast, Russia. It is located in the north of the oblast. The area of the district is 3,112 square kilometers (1,202 sq mi). Its administrative center is the rural locality (a sloboda) of Kashary. Population: 25,355 (2010 Census); 27,424 (2002 Census); 29,712 (1989 Soviet census). The population of Kashary accounts for 25.8% of the district's total population.

== Notable residents ==
- Ivan Kapitanets (1928–2018), Fleet Admiral in the Soviet Navy
