= Kashary, Rostov Oblast =

Kashary Кашары
- Sloboda
- Interactive map of Kashary
- Location of Kashary Kashary (Rostov Oblast)
- Coordinates: 49°02′25″N 41°00′09″E
- Country: Russia
- Federal subject: Rostov Oblast
- Administrative district: Kasharsky District
- Elevation: 79 m (259 ft)

Population (2010 Census)
  - Total: 6,529
  - Estimate (2010): 6,529 (0%)
- Time zone: UTC+3 (MSK)
- Postal code: 346200
- OKTMO ID: 60624430101

Kashary (Russian: Кашары) is a rural locality (a sloboda) in Kasharsky District of Rostov Oblast, Russia. Population: 6,529 (2010 census); 6,302 (2002 census). It is also the administrative center of Kasharsky District.

== Name ==
Initially the sloboda was called Verkhne-Olkhovaya (after the name of the Olkhovaya River). It started to be called Koshara in 1840s. The presence of extensive pastures and a source of watering on settlement territory allowed local landowners to maintain large flocks of sheep. Sheep were driven into the koshars (yard). Over time the settlement became known as Verkhne-Olkhovaya ― Koshary. The name of Koshary mentioned in archival sources was first mentioned in 1843 (and since 1963 it is known under the name of Kashary sloboda).

== History ==
Verkhne-Olkhovaya sloboda was first mentioned in official documents in 1790. In that year, there were 62 households, 189 men and 194 women. In 1839 the Church of St. Nicholas the Wonderworker was built there, and in 1868 a parish school was opened. In 1911, the first telephone line was established here.

According to data of 1897 census, the village had about 500 households.

During Russian Civil War, in March 1919, the Moscow regiment of the Red Army entered Kashary, yet in autumn of the save year Bolshevik forces were driven out after a popular uprising. In 1921 through the territory of the district was shortly taken by Makhno and Antonov forces.

Since 1924 the village has been the administrative center of Kasharsky District.

During World War II the settlement was briefly occupied by Germans and liberated in December 1942.

== Places of interest ==
- Kashary Museum of Local History
- A mound with ancient burials.
