= Zimovniki =

Zimovniki Зимовники
- Posyolok
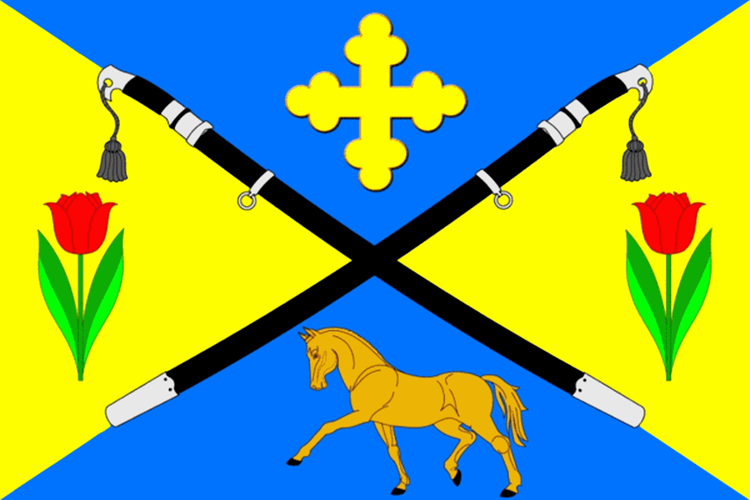
- Flag
- Interactive map of Zimovniki
- Location of Zimovniki Zimovniki (Rostov Oblast)
- Coordinates: 47°08′42″N 42°28′00″E
- Country: Russia
- Federal subject: Rostov Oblast
- Administrative district: Zimovnikovsky District
- Founded: 1898

Population (2010 Census)
  - Total: 18,070
  - Estimate (2010): 18,070 (0%)
- Time zone: UTC+3 (MSK)
- Postal code: 347460
- OKTMO ID: 60619417101

Zimovniki (Russian: Зимовники) is a rural locality (a posyolok) in Zimovnikovsky District of Rostov Oblast, Russia. Population: 18,070 (2010 census); 17,705 (2002 census). It is also the administrative center of Zimovnikovsky District.

== History ==
The history of Zimovniki village began in 1898. At this time the construction of Tikhoretskaya-Tsaritsyn railway line was being carried out. This railway had a station called Kalmytskaya. Around it a village began to grow, which was surrounded by numerous pasters (in Russian they are called Zimovniki). The station and the village quickly became a place for fairs, where livestock was sold and sent by rail. In 1904 Kalmytskaya station was renamed into Zimovniki station.

In 1924, Zimovnikovsky District was established, and the village became its administrative center. According to population census data of 1926, 2,885 people lived in the village of Zimovniki, and the majority of the population were Ukrainians ― 1,731, and Russians ― 798. The population grew rapidly. According to the 1939 census, there already were already 9,439 people living in the village, including 4722 men and 4717 women.

== Places of interest ==
- Zimovniki museum of local history
- Monument to T-34-85
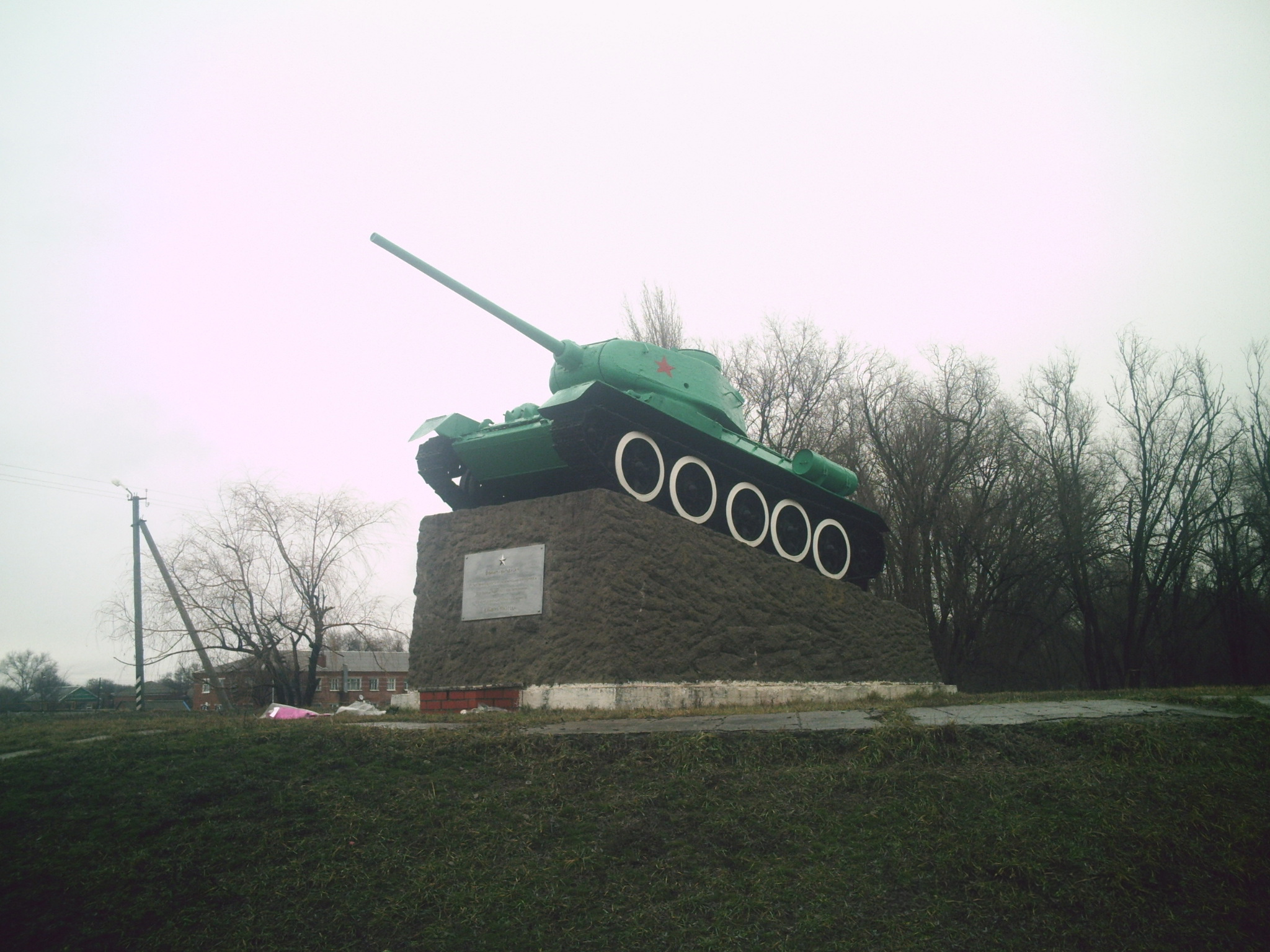
Monument to T-34-85

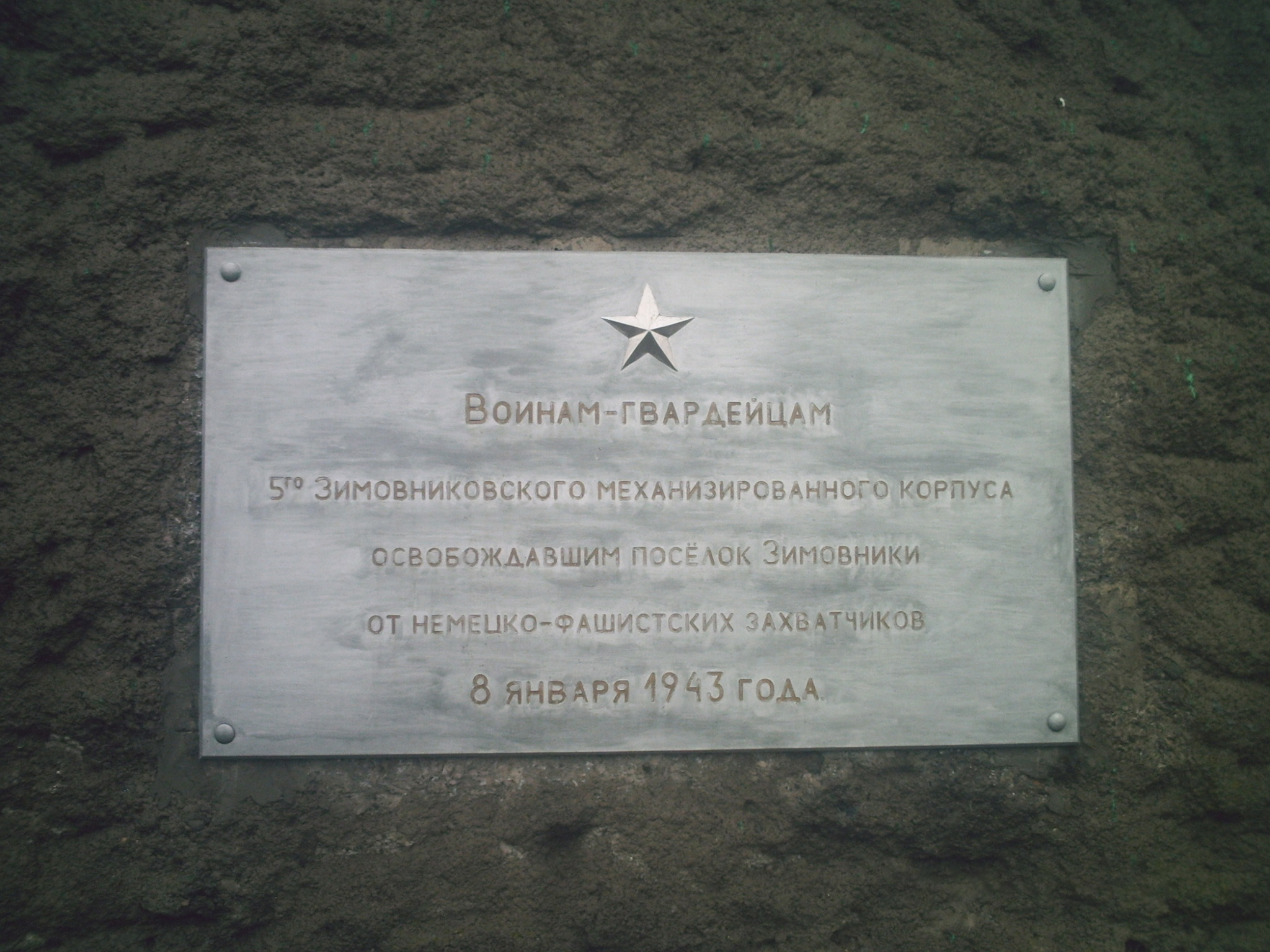
Memorial plaque dedicated to soldiers of 5th Guard Mechanized Corps
