= Bolshaya Martynovka =

Rural locality in Rostov Oblast, Russia

Coordinates: 47°16′29″N 41°39′42″E

Bolshaya Martynovka (Russian: Большая Мартыновка) is a rural locality (a sloboda) and the administrative center of Martynovsky District, Rostov Oblast, Russia. Population: 6,158 (2010 census); 6,823 (2002 census); 5,949 (1989 Soviet census).
