= Tselinsky District =

Tselinsky District Целинский район (Russian)
- District
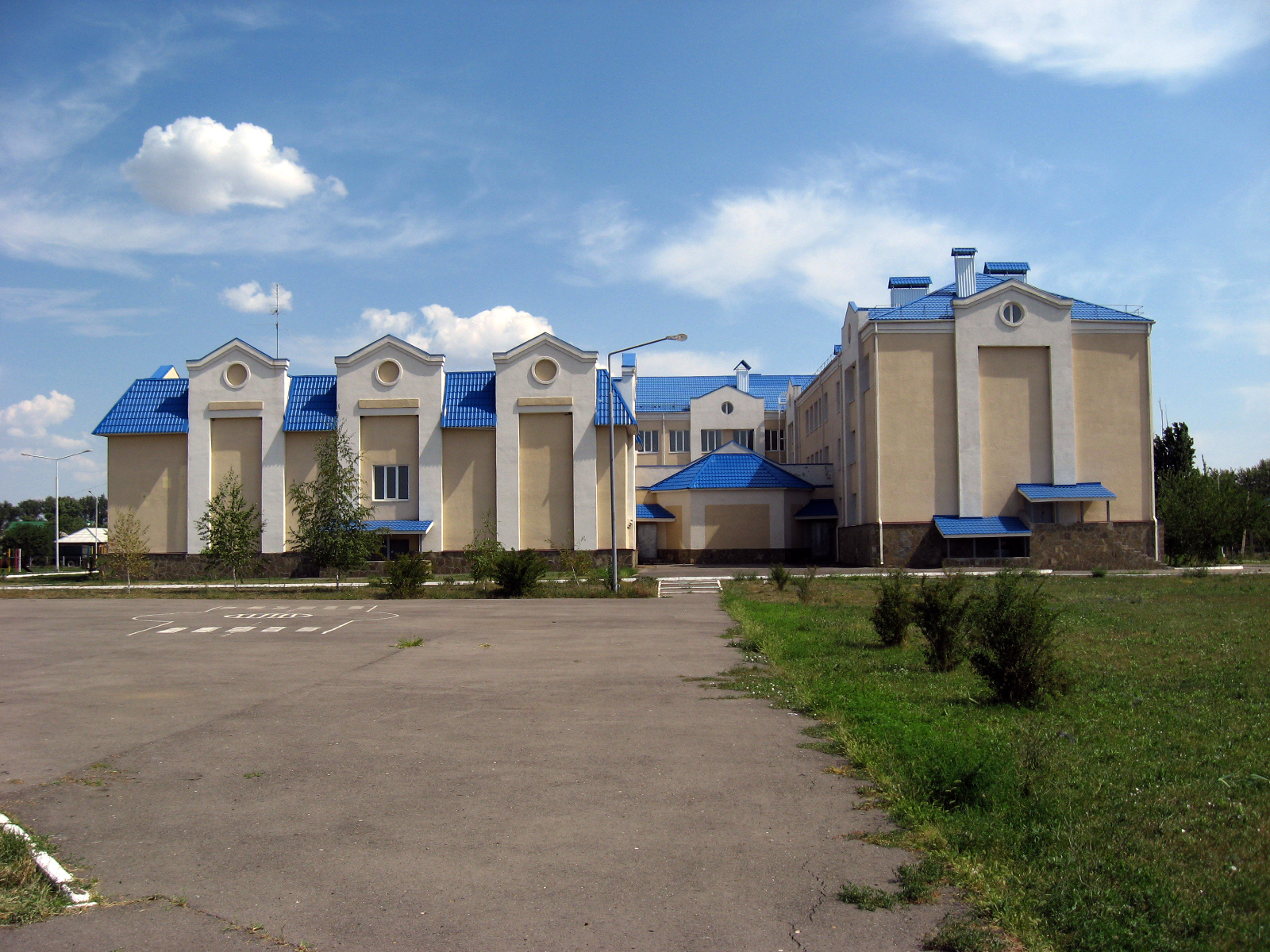
- School in village Celina, Tselinsky District

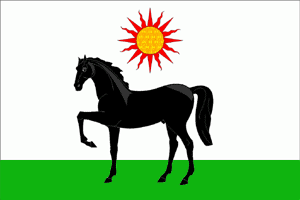
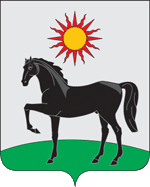
- Flag Coat of arms
- Location of Tselinsky District in Rostov Oblast
- Coordinates: 46°32′N 41°02′E
- Country: Russia
- Federal subject: Rostov Oblast
- Established: 1923
- Administrative center: Tselina

Area
  - Total: 2,129 km^{2} (822 sq mi)

Population (2010 Census)
  - Total: 33,690
  - Density: 15.82/km^{2} (40.98/sq mi)
  - Urban: 0%
  - Rural: 100%

Administrative structure
  - Administrative divisions: 9 rural settlement
  - Inhabited localities: 67 rural localities

Municipal structure
  - Municipally incorporated as: Tselinsky Municipal District
  - Municipal divisions: 0 urban settlements, 9 rural settlements
- Time zone: UTC+3 (MSK)
- OKTMO ID: 60656000
- Website: http://www.tselinaraion.ru/

Tselinsky District (Russian: Цели́нский райо́н) is an administrative and municipal district (raion), one of the forty-three in Rostov Oblast, Russia. It is located in the south of the oblast. The area of the district is 2,129 square kilometers (822 sq mi). Its administrative center is the rural locality (a settlement) of Tselina. Population: 33,690 (2010 Census); 36,742 (2002 census); 34,666 (1989 Soviet census). The population of Tselina accounts for 31.6% of the district's total population.

== Notable residents ==
- Oleg Fatun (born 1959), sprinter
