= Peschanokopskoye =

Peschanokopskoye Песчанокопское
- Selo
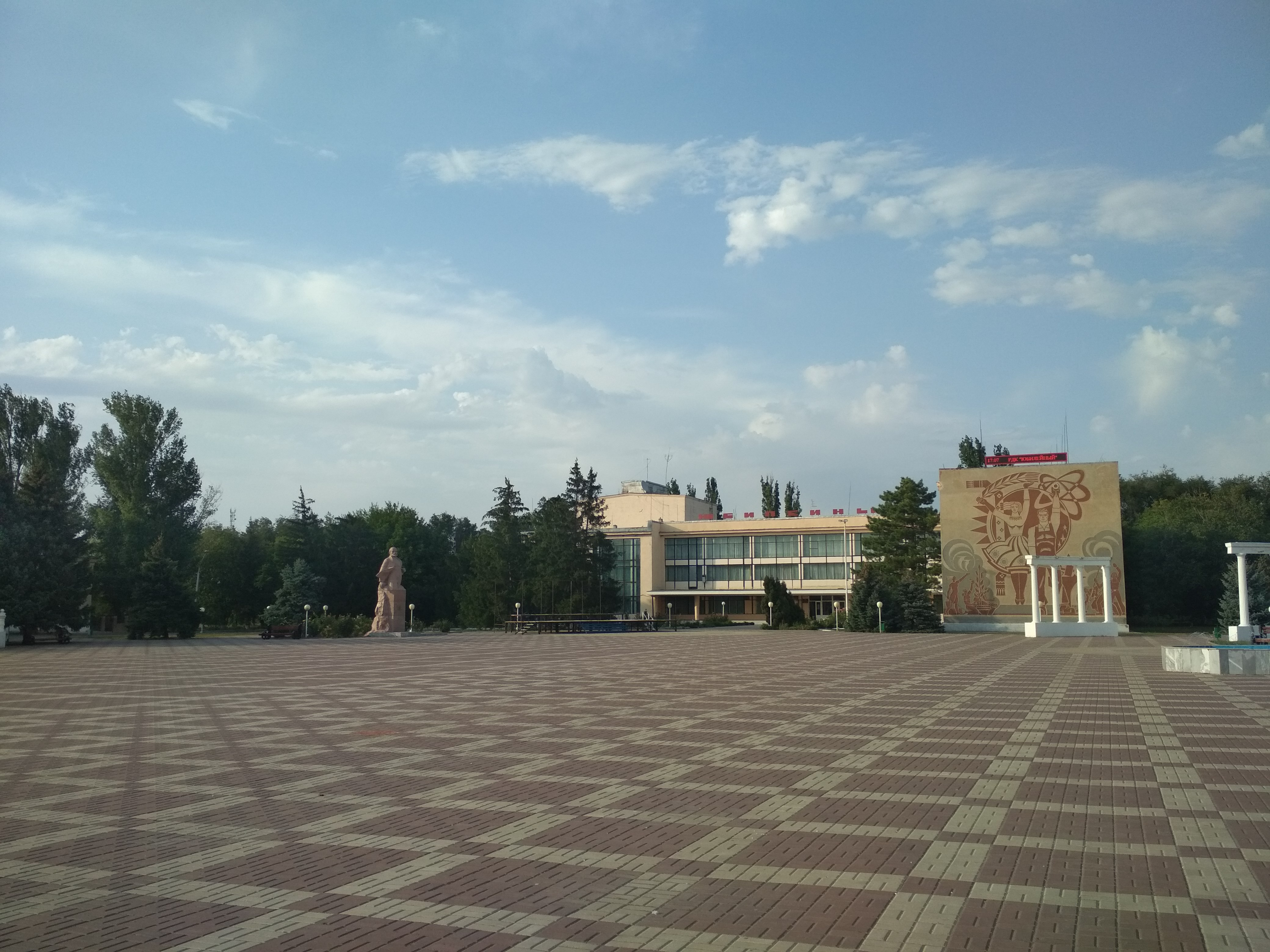

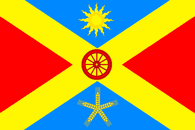
- Flag
- Interactive map of Peschanokopskoye
- Location of Peschanokopskoye Peschanokopskoye (Rostov Oblast)
- Coordinates: 46°11′45″N 41°04′40″E
- Country: Russia
- Federal subject: Rostov Oblast
- Administrative district: Peschanokopsky District

Population (2010 Census)
  - Total: 10,593
  - Estimate (2010): 10,593 (0%)

Administrative status
  - Capital of: Peschanokopsky District
- Time zone: UTC+3 (MSK)
- Postal code: 347570–347572
- OKTMO ID: 60644455101

Peschanokopskoye (Russian: Песчанокопское) is a rural locality (a selo) and the administrative center of Peschanokopsky District in Rostov Oblast, Russia. Population: 10,593 (2010 census); 11,357 (2002 census); 10,966 (1989 Soviet census).

In World War II, the town was captured by 13th Panzer Division forces during the advance by III Panzer Corps on 1 August 1942.
