= Rodionovo-Nesvetaysky District =

Rodionovo-Nesvetaysky District Родионово-Несветайский район
- District
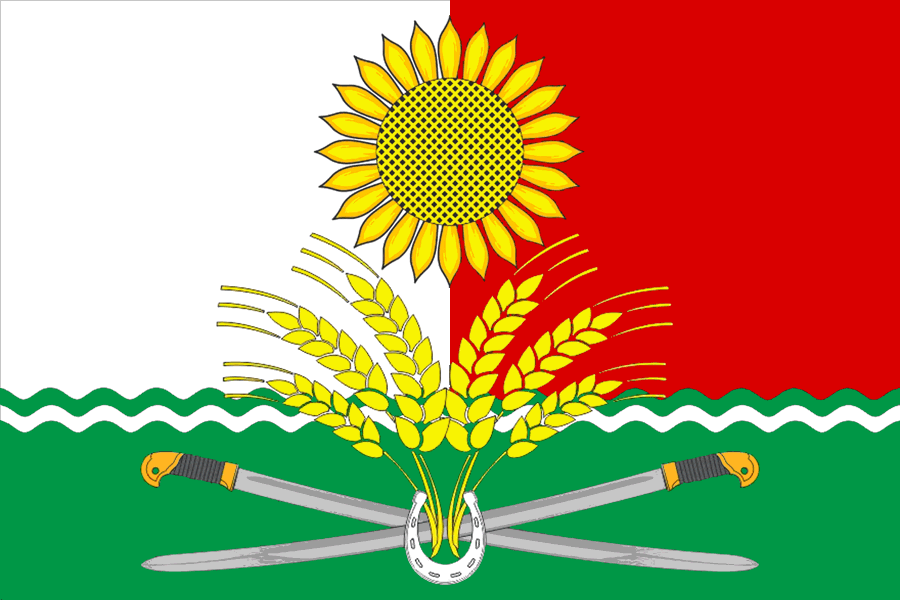
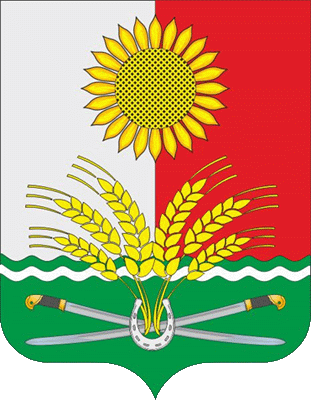
- Flag Coat of arms
- Location of Rodionovo-Nesvetaysky District in Rostov Oblast
- Coordinates: 47°36′50″N 39°42′03″E
- Country: Russia
- Federal subject: Rostov Oblast
- Established: 1935
- Administrative center: Rodionovo-Nesvetayskaya

Area
  - Total: 1,547 km^{2} (597 sq mi)

Population (2010 Census)
  - Total: 23,632
  - Density: 15.28/km^{2} (39.56/sq mi)
  - Urban: 0%
  - Rural: 100%

Administrative structure
  - Administrative divisions: 6 rural settlement
  - Inhabited localities: 53 rural localities

Municipal structure
  - Municipally incorporated as: Rodionovo-Nesvetaysky Municipal District
  - Municipal divisions: 0 urban settlements, 6 rural settlements
- Time zone: UTC+3 (MSK)
- OKTMO ID: 60648000
- Website: http://nesvetai.donland.ru/

Rodionovo-Nesvetaysky District (Russian: Родионово-Несветайский райо́н) is an administrative and municipal district (raion), one of the forty-three in Rostov Oblast, Russia. It is located in the west of the oblast. The area of the district is 1,547 square kilometers (597 sq mi). Its administrative center is the rural locality (a sloboda) of Rodionovo-Nesvetayskaya. Population: 23,632 (2010 Census); 23,391 (2002 Census); 21,665 (1989 Soviet census). The population of Rodionovo-Nesvetayskaya accounts for 27.0% of the district's total population.

== Notable residents ==
- Aleksandr Rudenko, footballer, born 1999 in Daryevka
