= Yegorlykskaya =

Yegorlykskaya Егорлыкская
- Stanitsa
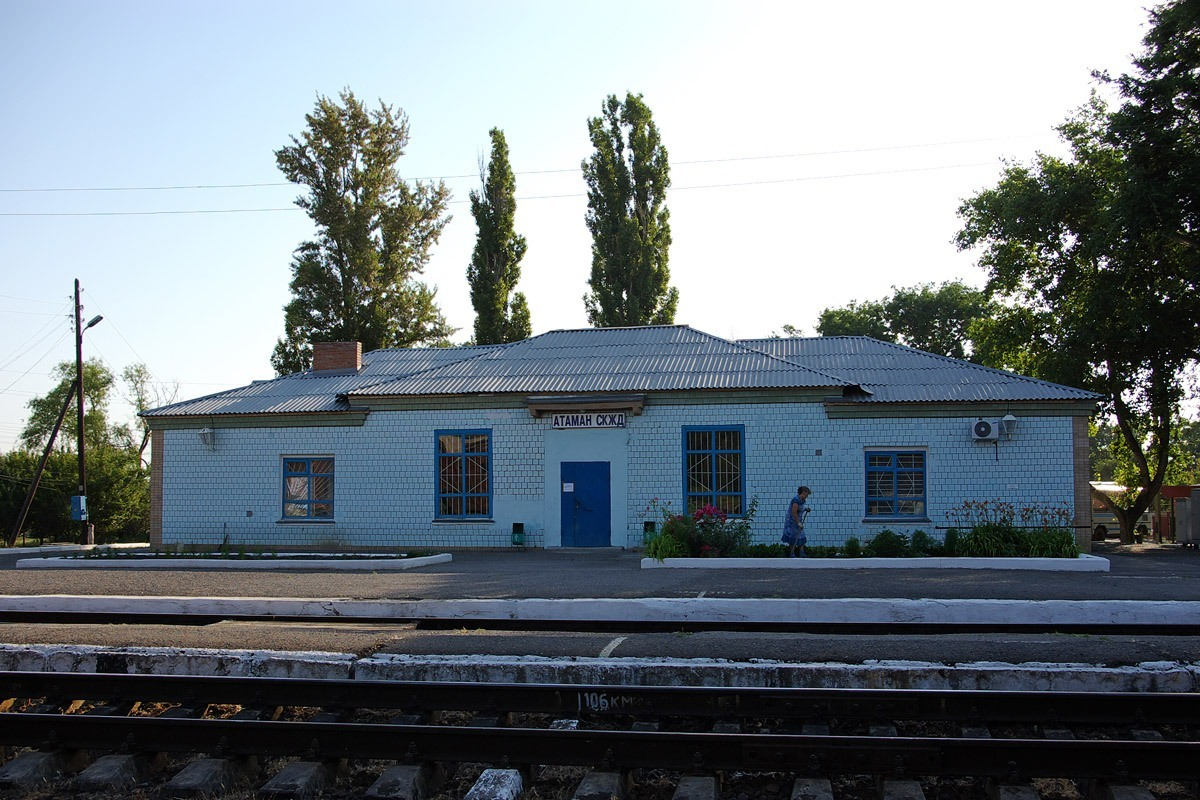

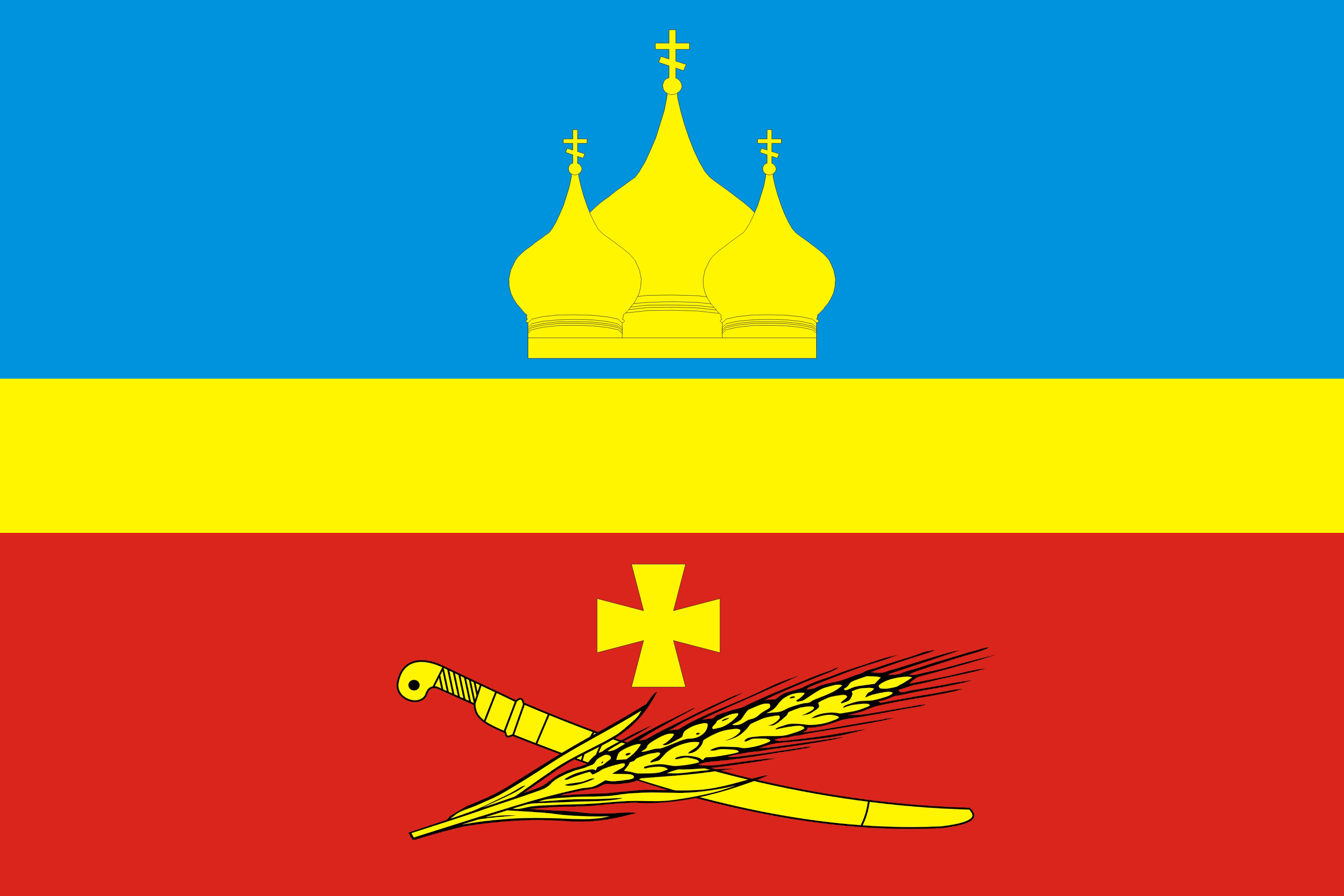
- Flag
- Interactive map of Yegorlykskaya
- Location of Yegorlykskaya Yegorlykskaya (Rostov Oblast)
- Coordinates: 46°33′N 40°39′E
- Country: Russia
- Federal subject: Rostov Oblast
- Administrative district: Yegorlyksky District
- Founded: 1809
- Elevation: 90 m (300 ft)

Population (2010 Census)
  - Total: 17,660
  - Estimate (2010): 17,660 (0%)

Administrative status
  - Capital of: Yegorlyksky District
- Time zone: UTC+3 (MSK)
- Postal code: 347660–347664
- OKTMO ID: 60615417101

Yegorlykskaya (Russian: Егорлыкская) is a rural locality (a stanitsa) and the administrative center of Yegorlyksky District in Rostov Oblast, Russia. Population: 17,660 (2010 census); 18,005 (2002 census); 15,805 (1989 Soviet census).
