= Peschanokopsky District =

Peschanokopsky District Песчанокопский район
- District
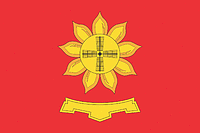
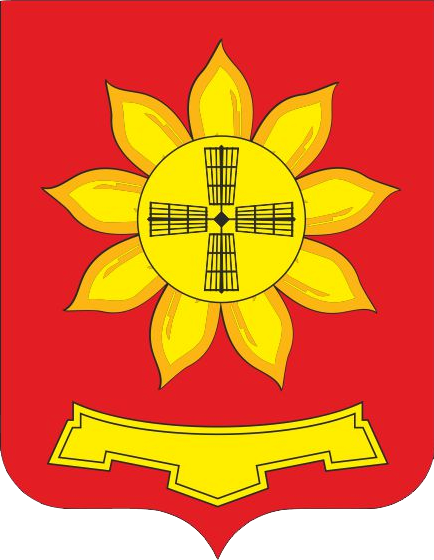
- Flag Coat of arms
- Location of Peschanokopsky District in Rostov Oblast
- Coordinates: 46°11′46″N 41°04′39″E
- Country: Russia
- Federal subject: Rostov Oblast
- Established: 1935
- Administrative center: Peschanokopskoye

Area
  - Total: 1,885 km^{2} (728 sq mi)

Population (2010 Census)
  - Total: 31,619
  - Density: 16.77/km^{2} (43.44/sq mi)
  - Urban: 0%
  - Rural: 100%

Administrative structure
  - Administrative divisions: 9 rural settlement
  - Inhabited localities: 19 rural localities

Municipal structure
  - Municipally incorporated as: Peschanokopsky Municipal District
  - Municipal divisions: 0 urban settlements, 9 rural settlements
- Time zone: UTC+3 (MSK)
- OKTMO ID: 60644000
- Website: http://peschanrn.donland.ru/

Peschanokopsky District (Russian: Песчаноко́пский райо́н) is an administrative and municipal district (raion), one of the forty-three in Rostov Oblast, Russia. It is located in the south of the oblast. The area of the district is 1,885 square kilometers (728 sq mi). Its administrative center is the rural locality (a selo) of Peschanokopskoye. Population: 31,619 (2010 Census); 34,171 (2002 Census); 34,367 (1989 Soviet census). The population of Peschanokopskoye accounts for 33.5% of the district's total population.

== Notable residents ==
- Nina Pereverzeva (1929–2022), Soviet politician, born in Letnik
