= Vesyolovsky District =

Vesyolovsky District Весёловский район (Russian)
- District
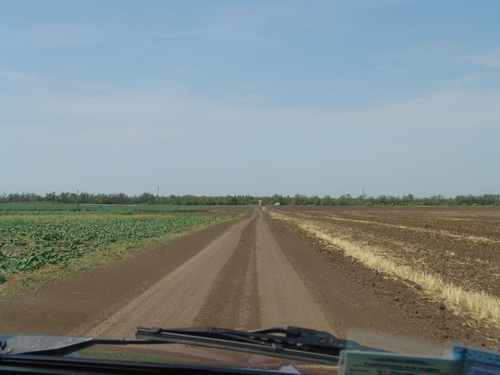
- Landscape in Vesyolovsky District

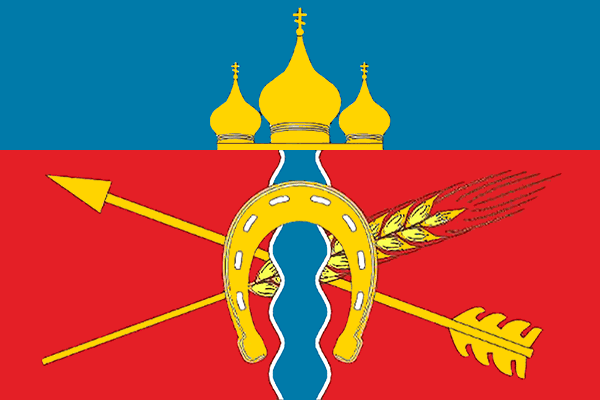
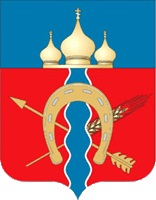
- Flag Coat of arms
- Location of Vesyolovsky District in Rostov Oblast
- Coordinates: 47°05′05″N 40°44′15″E
- Country: Russia
- Federal subject: Rostov Oblast
- Established: 1935
- Administrative center: Vesyoly

Area
  - Total: 1,355 km^{2} (523 sq mi)

Population (2010 Census)
  - Total: 26,165
  - Density: 19.31/km^{2} (50.01/sq mi)
  - Urban: 0%
  - Rural: 100%

Administrative structure
  - Administrative divisions: 4 rural settlement
  - Inhabited localities: 30 rural localities

Municipal structure
  - Municipally incorporated as: Vesyolovsky Municipal District
  - Municipal divisions: 0 urban settlements, 4 rural settlements
- Time zone: UTC+3 (MSK)
- OKTMO ID: 60609000
- Website: http://veselorn.donland.ru/

Vesyolovsky District (Russian: Весёловский райо́н) is an administrative and municipal district (raion), one of the forty-three in Rostov Oblast, Russia. It is located in the southern central part of the oblast. The area of the district is 1,355 square kilometers (523 sq mi). Its administrative center is the rural locality (a settlement) of Vesyoly. Population: 26,165 (2010 Census); 26,564 (2002 census); 23,016 (1989 Soviet census). The population of Vesyoly accounts for 35.1% of the district's total population.
