= Zernograd =

Town in Rostov Oblast, Russia

Zernograd Зерноград
- Town
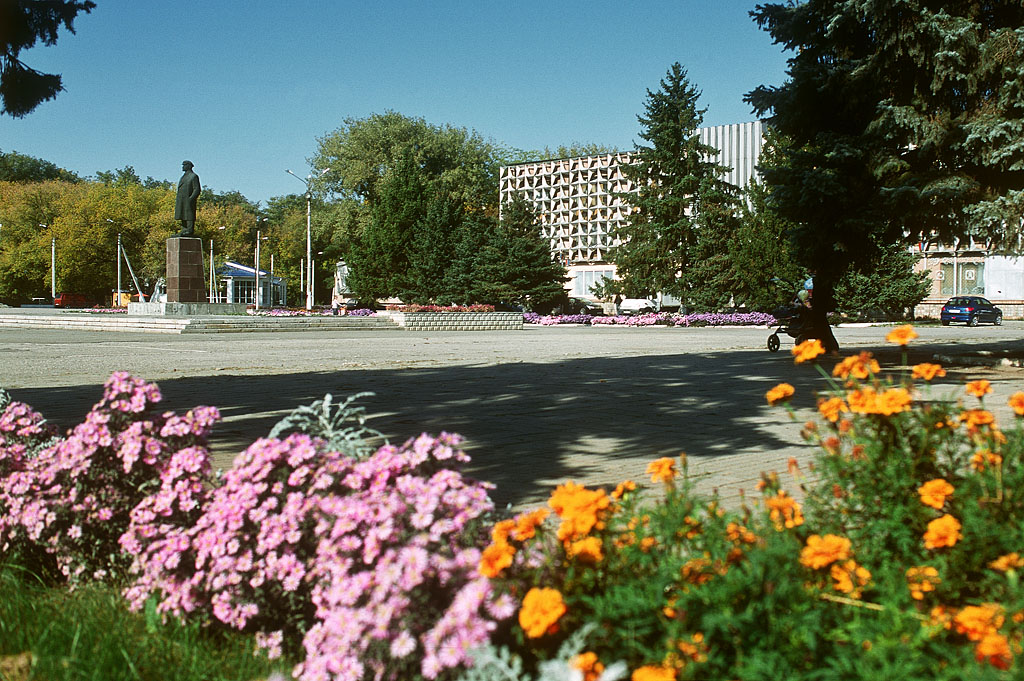
- Zernograd town square

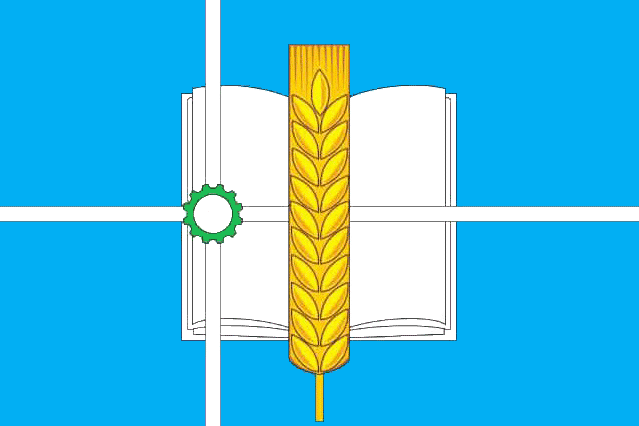
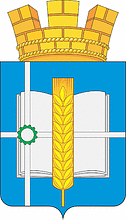
- Flag Coat of arms
- Interactive map of Zernograd
- Location of Zernograd Zernograd (Rostov Oblast)
- Coordinates: 46°51′N 40°19′E
- Country: Russia
- Federal subject: Rostov Oblast
- Administrative district: Zernogradsky District
- Urban settlementSelsoviet: Zernogradskoye
- Founded: 1915
- Town status since: 1951

Population (2010 Census)
  - Total: 26,842
  - Estimate (2021): 24,076 (−10.3%)

Administrative status
  - Capital of: Zernogradsky District, Zernogradskoye Urban Settlement

Municipal status
  - Municipal district: Zernogradsky Municipal District
  - Urban settlement: Zernogradskoye Urban Settlement
  - Capital of: Zernogradsky Municipal District, Zernogradskoye Urban Settlement
- Time zone: UTC+3 (MSK)
- Postal codes: 347740, 347742, 347743, 347749
- Dialing code: +7 86359
- OKTMO ID: 60618101001
- Website: web.archive.org/web/20140714144652/http://www.zernograd.org/

Zernograd (Russian: Зерногра́д, literally "Grain town") is a town and the administrative center of Zernogradsky District in Rostov Oblast, Russia, located 71 kilometers (44 mi) southeast of Rostov-on-Don, the administrative center of the oblast. Population: 26,842 (2010 census); 28,840 (2002 census); 26,097 (1989 Soviet census).

== History ==
Historical affiliations

Russian Empire 1915–1917
Russian Republic 1917
Soviet Russia 1917–1922
Soviet Union 1922–1991
Russian Federation 1991–present

It was founded in 1915 as the halt of Verblyud (Верблю́д) due to the construction of the Rostov–Torgovaya railway. By 1933, it became a settlement and was renamed Zernovoy (Зерново́й). It was granted town status in 1951 and renamed Zernograd in 1960.

== Administrative and municipal status ==
Within the framework of administrative divisions, Zernograd serves as the administrative center of Zernogradsky District. As an administrative division, it is, together with ten rural localities, incorporated within Zernogradsky District as Zernogradskoye Urban Settlement. As a municipal division, this administrative unit also has urban settlement status and is a part of Zernogradsky Municipal District.

== Military ==
From 1969 to 1995, Zernograd (air base) was home to the 106th Training Aviation Regiment, Yeysk Higher Military School of Pilots, of the Soviet Air Forces. The regiment was equipped with the L-29 and L-39 jet trainer aircraft. The airbase is now home to the 16th Army Aviation Brigade.
