= Kagalnitsky District =

Kagalnitsky District Кагальницкий район
- District
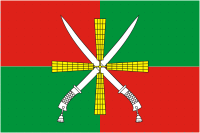
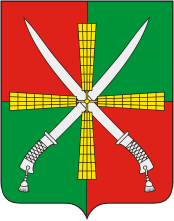
- Flag Coat of arms
- Location of Kagalnitsky District in Rostov Oblast
- Coordinates: 46°52′55″N 40°09′01″E
- Country: Russia
- Federal subject: Rostov Oblast
- Established: 1935
- Administrative center: Kagalnitskaya

Area
  - Total: 1,370 km^{2} (530 sq mi)

Population (2010 Census)
  - Total: 30,489
  - Density: 22.3/km^{2} (57.6/sq mi)
  - Urban: 0%
  - Rural: 100%

Administrative structure
  - Administrative divisions: 8 rural settlement
  - Inhabited localities: 40 rural localities

Municipal structure
  - Municipally incorporated as: Kagalnitsky Municipal District
  - Municipal divisions: 0 urban settlements, 8 rural settlements
- Time zone: UTC+3 (MSK)
- OKTMO ID: 60622000
- Website: http://kagl-rayon.donland.ru/

Kagalnitsky District (Russian: Кагальницкий райо́н) is an administrative and municipal district (raion), one of the forty-three in Rostov Oblast, Russia. It is located in the southwest of the oblast. The area of the district is 1,370 square kilometers (530 sq mi). Its administrative center is the rural locality (a stanitsa) of Kagalnitskaya. Population: 30,489 (2010 Census); 31,189 (2002 Census); 27,901 (1989 Soviet census). The population of Kagalnitskaya accounts for 22.4% of the district's total population.
