= Yegorlyksky District =

Yegorlyksky District Егорлыкский район (Russian)
- District
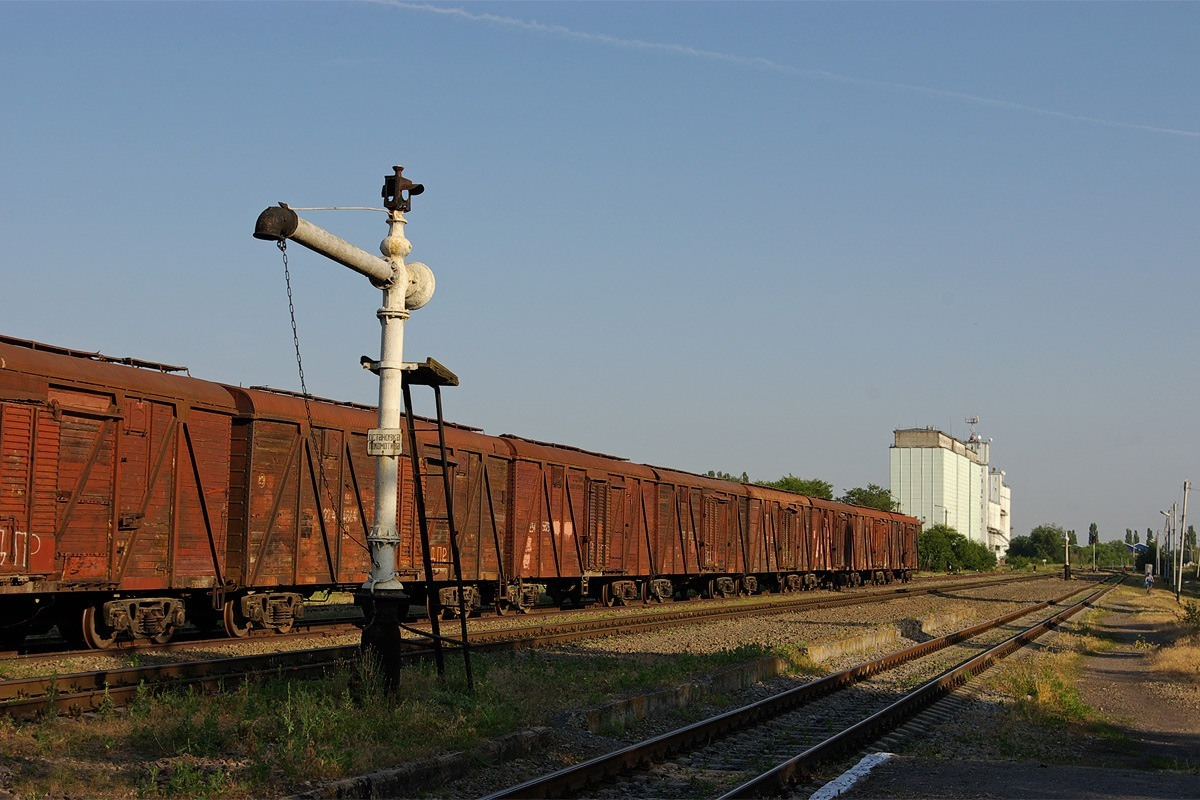
- Train and grain elevators in Yegorlyksky District

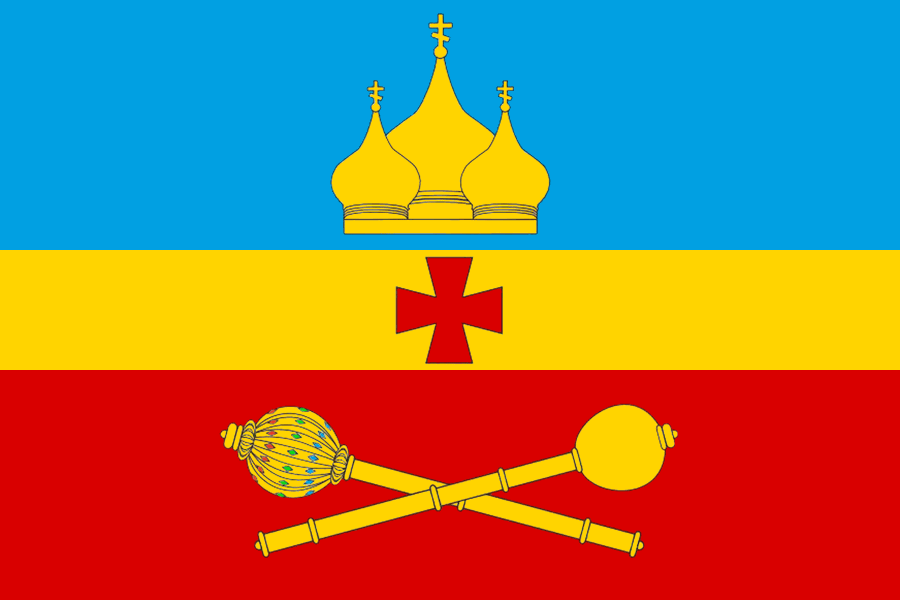
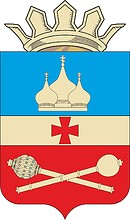
- Flag Coat of arms
- Location of Yegorlyksky District in Rostov Oblast
- Coordinates: 46°33′N 40°39′E
- Country: Russia
- Federal subject: Rostov Oblast
- Established: 18 January 1935
- Administrative center: Yegorlykskaya

Area
  - Total: 1,460 km^{2} (560 sq mi)

Population (2010 Census)
  - Total: 35,733
  - Density: 24.5/km^{2} (63.4/sq mi)
  - Urban: 0%
  - Rural: 100%

Administrative structure
  - Administrative divisions: 9 rural settlement
  - Inhabited localities: 36 rural localities

Municipal structure
  - Municipally incorporated as: Yegorlyksky Municipal District
  - Municipal divisions: 0 urban settlements, 9 rural settlements
- Time zone: UTC+3 (MSK)
- OKTMO ID: 60615000
- Website: http://www.egorlykraion.ru/

Yegorlyksky District (Russian: Егорлы́кский райо́н) is an administrative and municipal district (raion), one of the forty-three in Rostov Oblast, Russia. It is located in the south of the oblast. The area of the district is 1,460 square kilometers (560 sq mi). Its administrative center is the rural locality (a stanitsa) of Yegorlykskaya. Population: 35,733 (2010 Census); 36,996 (2002 census); 33,378 (1989 Soviet census). The population of Yegorlykskaya accounts for 49.4% of the district's total population.

== Notable residents ==
- Saak Karapetyan (1960–2018), Russian deputy attorney general of Armenian descent, born in the rural settlement of Balko-Gruzskoe
- Fedor Tokarev (1871–1968), weapons designer, deputy of the Supreme Soviet 1937–1950, born in the stanitsa of Yegorlykskaya
