= Zernogradsky District =

Zernogradsky District Зерноградский район (Russian)
- District
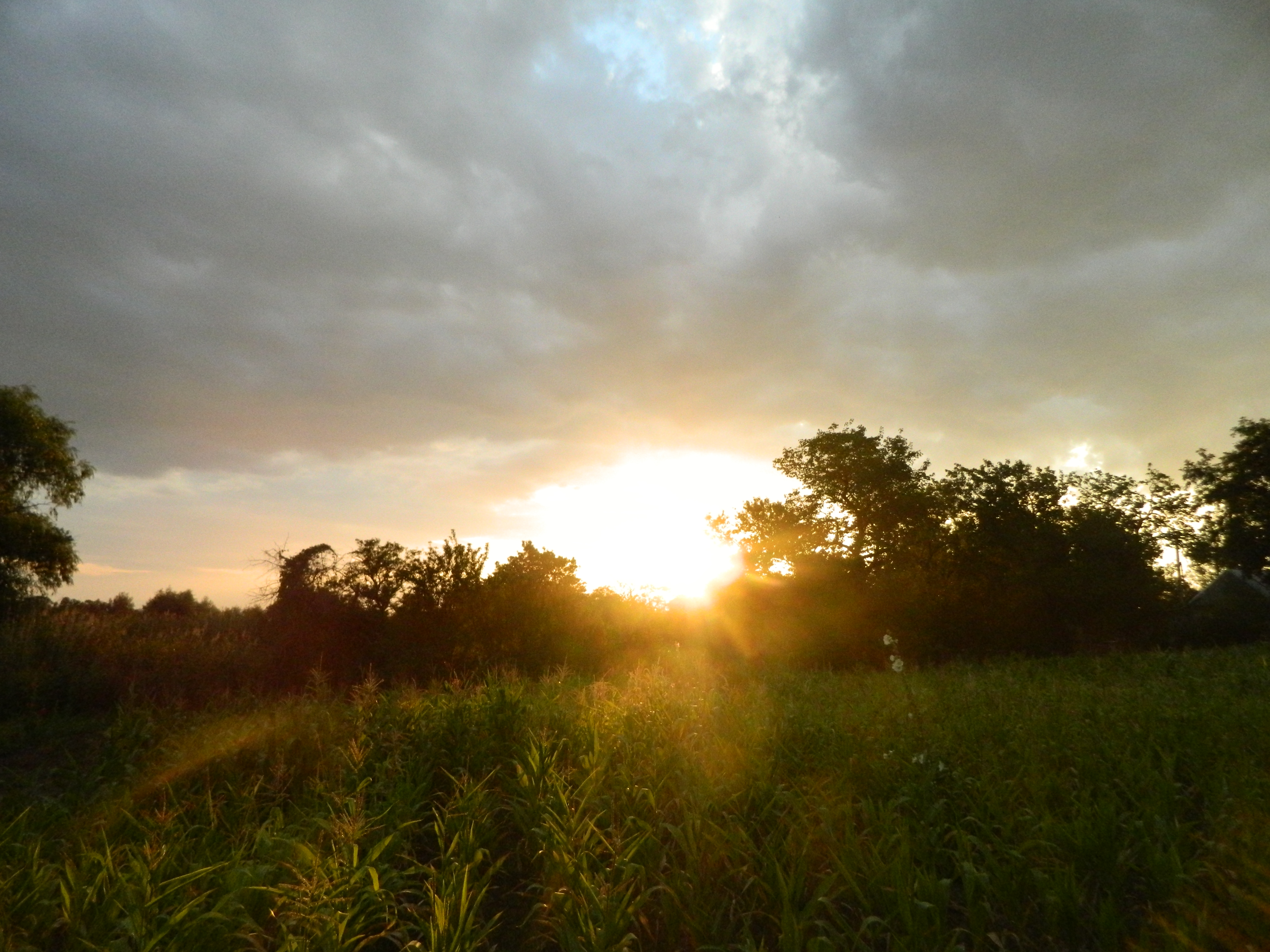
- Khorol, Zernogradsky District

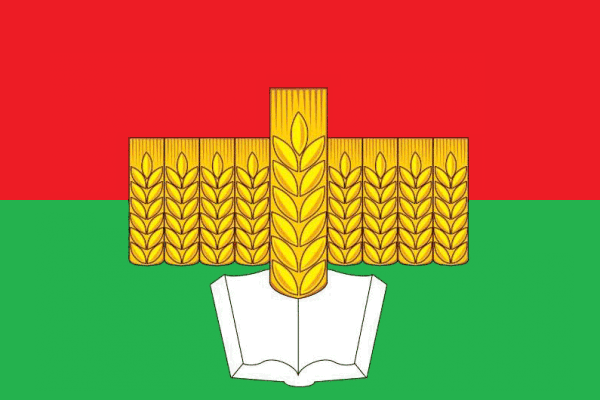
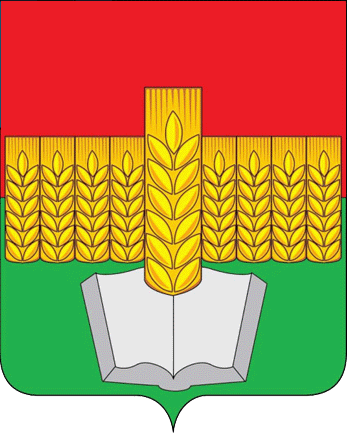
- Flag Coat of arms
- Location of Zernogradsky District in Rostov Oblast
- Coordinates: 46°50′52″N 40°18′24″E
- Country: Russia
- Federal subject: Rostov Oblast
- Established: 1924
- Administrative center: Zernograd

Area
  - Total: 2,663 km^{2} (1,028 sq mi)

Population (2010 Census)
  - Total: 58,757
  - Density: 22.06/km^{2} (57.15/sq mi)
  - Urban: 45.7%
  - Rural: 54.3%

Administrative structure
  - Administrative divisions: 1 Urban settlements, 8 Rural settlements
  - Inhabited localities: 1 cities/towns, 62 rural localities

Municipal structure
  - Municipally incorporated as: Zernogradsky Municipal District
  - Municipal divisions: 1 urban settlements, 8 rural settlements
- Time zone: UTC+3 (MSK)
- OKTMO ID: 60618000
- Website: http://zernoland.ru/

Zernogradsky District (Russian: Зерногра́дский райо́н) is an administrative and municipal district (raion), one of the forty-three in Rostov Oblast, Russia. It is located in the south of the oblast. The area of the district is 2,663 square kilometers (1,028 sq mi). Its administrative center is the town of Zernograd. Population: 58,757 (2010 Census); 66,481 (2002 census); 61,140 (1989 Soviet census). The population of Zernograd accounts for 45.7% of the district's total population.
