= Azovsky District =

Azovsky District Азовский район (Russian)
- District
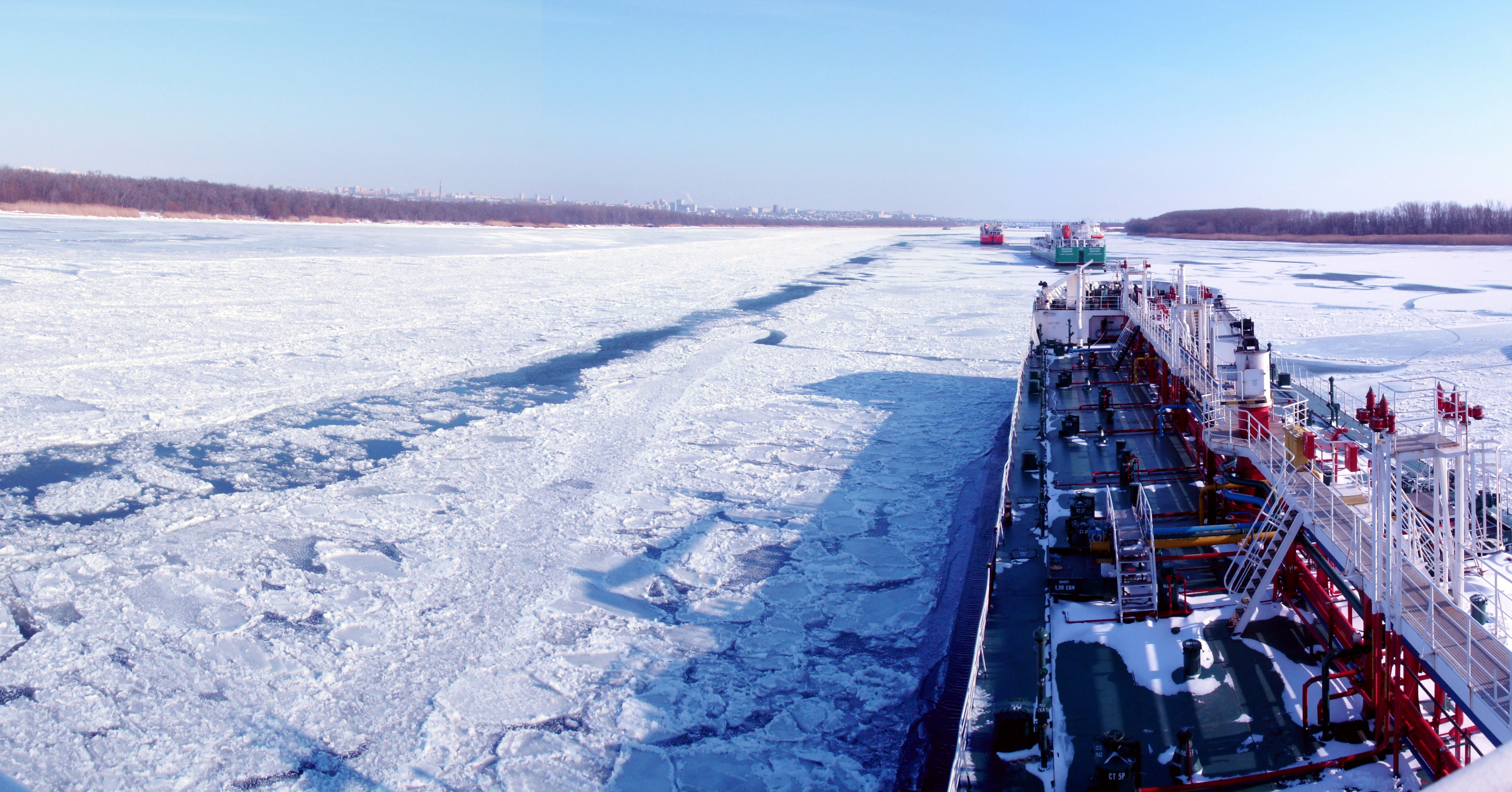
- Don River in Winter, Azovsky District

- Flag Coat of arms
- Location of Azovsky District in Rostov Oblast
- Coordinates: 47°06′N 39°25′E
- Country: Russia
- Federal subject: Rostov Oblast
- Established: 1924
- Administrative center: Azov

Area
  - Total: 2,862 km^{2} (1,105 sq mi)

Population (2010 Census)
  - Total: 93,579
  - Density: 32.70/km^{2} (84.69/sq mi)
  - Urban: 0%
  - Rural: 100%

Administrative structure
  - Administrative divisions: 18 rural settlement
  - Inhabited localities: 99 rural localities

Municipal structure
  - Municipally incorporated as: Azovsky Municipal District
  - Municipal divisions: 0 urban settlements, 18 rural settlements
- Time zone: UTC+3 (MSK)
- OKTMO ID: 60601000
- Website: http://www.rayon.azov-info.ru/

Azovsky District (Russian: Азо́вский райо́н) is an administrative and municipal district (raion), one of the forty-three in Rostov Oblast, Russia. It is located in the southwest of the oblast. The area of the district is 2,862 square kilometers (1,105 sq mi). Its administrative center is the town of Azov (which is not administratively a part of the district). Population: 93,579 (2010 Census); 92,568 (2002 census); 83,393 (1989 Soviet census).

== Administrative and municipal status ==
Within the framework of administrative divisions, Azovsky District is one of the forty-three in the oblast. The town of Azov serves as its administrative center, despite being incorporated separately as an urban okrug—an administrative unit with the status equal to that of the districts.

As a municipal division, the district is incorporated as Azovsky Municipal District. Azov Urban Okrug is incorporated separately from the district.
