= Ust-Donetsky constituency =

Ust-Donetsky single-member constituency
- Constituency of the Russian State Duma
- Deputy: Yekaterina Stenyakina; United Russia
- Federal subject: Rostov Oblast
- Districts: Dubovsky, Konstantinovsky, Martynovsky, Morozovsky, Oktyabrsky (Artemovskoye, Kerchikskoye), Remontnensky, Semikarakorsky, Shakhty, Tsimlyansky, Ust-Donetsky, Volgodonsk, Volgodonskoy, Zavetinsky, Zimovnikovsky
- Voters: 514,470 (2026)

The Ust-Donetsky constituency (No.156 (Note: Volgodonsk constituency No.142 in 1993-1995, Volgodonsk constituency No.143 in 1995-2007)) is a Russian legislative constituency in Rostov Oblast. The constituency stretches from Shakhty to rural eastern Rostov Oblast.

The constituency has been represented since 2026 by United Russia deputy Yekaterina Stenyakina, two-term State Duma member and party activist, who was redistricted from the eliminated Shakhty constituency, while two-term United Russia incumbent Viktor Deryabkin retired.

== Boundaries ==
1993–1995 Volgodonsk constituency: Dubovsky District, Konstantinovsky District, Martynovsky District, Orlovsky District, Peschanokopsky District, Proletarsky District, Remontnensky, Salsk, Salsky District, Semikarakorsky District, Tselinsky District, Tsimlyansky District, Volgodonsk, Volgodonskoy District, Zavetinsky District, Zimovnikovsky District
The constituency covered predominantly rural eastern and central Rostov Oblast, including the cities Volgodonsk and Salsk.

1995–2007 Volgodonsk constituency: Dubovsky District, Martynovsky District, Orlovsky District, Peschanokopsky District, Proletarsky District, Remontnensky, Salsk, Salsky District, Tselinsky District, Tsimlyansky District, Volgodonsk, Vesyolovsky District, Volgodonskoy District, Zavetinsky District, Zimovnikovsky District
After the 1995 redistricting Rostov Oblast gained the seventh constituency, so all other districts were redrawn. The constituency retained most of its territory, losing Konstantinovsky and Semikarakorsky districts in central Rostov Oblast to new Belaya Kalitva constituency. This seat gained Vesyolovsky District from the former Rostov-Sovetsky constituency.

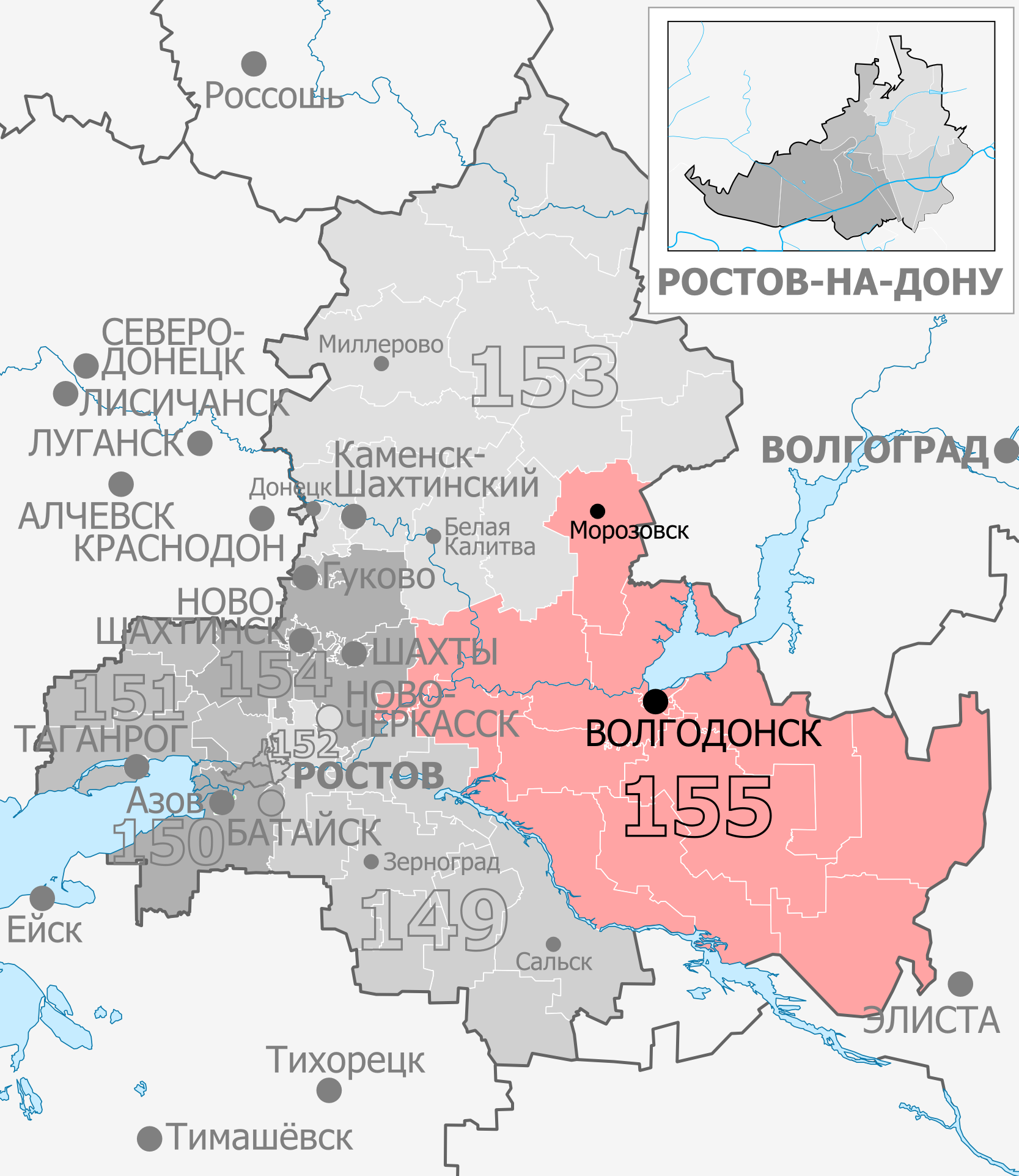
Constituency boundaries from 2016 to 2026

2016–2026 Volgodonsk constituency: Dubovsky District, Konstantinovsky District, Martynovsky District, Morozovsky District, Orlovsky District, Proletarsky District, Remontnensky District, Semikarakorsky District, Tsimlyansky District, Ust-Donetsky District, Volgodonsk, Volgodonskoy District, Zavetinsky District, Zimovnikovsky District
The constituency was re-created for the 2016 election and retained most of its territory, losing its southern portion on the left bank of the Manych river, including Salsk, to Rostov constituency. This seat instead gained Konstantinovsky, Semikarakorsky and Ust-Donetsky districts from the former Belaya Kalitva constituency as well as Morozovsky District from the dissolved Kamensk-Shakhtinsky constituency.

2026–present: Dubovsky District, Konstantinovsky District, Martynovsky District, Morozovsky District, Oktyabrsky District (Artemovskoye, Kerchikskoye), Remontnensky District, Semikarakorsky District, Shakhty, Tsimlyansky District, Ust-Donetsky District, Volgodonsk, Volgodonskoy District, Zavetinsky District, Zimovnikovsky District
Following the 2025 redistricting Rostov Oblast lost one of its seven constituencies, so all the remaining seats saw major changes. The constituency took the name "Ust-Donetsky constituency" and retained almost all of its territory, losing Orlovsky and Proletarsky districts to Bataysk constituency. This seat was pushed westwards, gaining Shakhty and small part of Oktyabrsky District from the dissolved Shakhty constituency.

== Members elected ==
Election	Member	Party
1993	Sergey Ponomaryov	Independent
1995	Tatyana Shubina	Independent
1999	Viktor Topilin	Independent
2003	Valery Dyatlenko	United Russia
2007	Proportional representation - no election by constituency	
2011	Proportional representation - no election by constituency	
2016	Viktor Deryabkin	United Russia
2021	Viktor Deryabkin	United Russia
2026	Yekaterina Stenyakina	United Russia

== Election results ==
=== 1993 ===
Summary of the 12 December 1993 Russian legislative election in the Volgodonsk constituency
Candidate	Party	Votes	%
Sergey Ponomaryov	Independent	100,734	30.77%
Valentin Miroshnikov	Independent	58,970	18.01%
Nikolay Morkovskoy	Agrarian Party	40,295	12.31%
Vyacheslav Khizhnyakov	Independent	36,785	11.23%
Sergey Sherstyuk	Independent	22,038	6.73%
against all		43,623	13.32%
Total		327,429	100%

=== 1995 ===
Summary of the 17 December 1995 Russian legislative election in the Volgodonsk constituency
Candidate	Party	Votes	%
Tatyana Shubina	Independent	95,702	27.08%
Sergey Ponomaryov (incumbent)	Agrarian Party	77,550	21.95%
Aleksandr Popov	Independent	29,352	8.31%
Nikolay Kozitsyn	Russian All-People's Movement	22,270	6.30%
Olga Vereshchak	Party of Workers' Self-Government	20,083	5.68%
Vladimir Samarsky	Education — Future of Russia	16,718	4.73%
Gennady Motyanin	Democratic Choice of Russia – United Democrats	15,562	4.40%
Gennady Klimov	Independent	15,385	4.35%
Sergey Mishanin	Independent	14,653	4.15%
Nikolay Rodzyanko	Ivan Rybkin Bloc	6,128	1.73%
against all		34,580	9.79%
Total		353,355	100%

=== 1999 ===
Summary of the 19 December 1999 Russian legislative election in the Volgodonsk constituency
Candidate	Party	Votes	%
Viktor Topilin	Independent	102,355	32.17%
Ivan Litvinov	Russian Socialist Party	60,190	18.92%
Nikolay Sungurov	Communist Party	55,396	17.41%
Grigory Zabolotsky	Union of Right Forces	27,580	8.67%
Sergey Grinko	Independent	9,980	3.14%
Nikolay Kozitsyn	Movement in Support of the Army	9,506	2.99%
Nikolay Lysenko	Russian All-People's Union	3,403	1.07%
against all		44,844	14.09%
Total		318,168	100%

=== 2003 ===
Summary of the 7 December 2003 Russian legislative election in the Volgodonsk constituency
Candidate	Party	Votes	%
Valery Dyatlenko	United Russia	157,370	56.55%
Viktor Topilin (incumbent)	People's Party	34,330	12.34%
Vladimir Karpov	Liberal Democratic Party	15,559	5.59%
Anna Gordeyeva	United Russian Party Rus'	13,966	5.02%
Aleksandr Lebed	Party of Russia's Rebirth-Russian Party of Life	10,375	3.73%
Georgy Zheluntsyn	Independent	2,852	1.02%
against all		39,257	14.11%
Total		278,369	100%

=== 2016 ===
Summary of the 18 September 2016 Russian legislative election in the Volgodonsk constituency
Candidate	Party	Votes	%
Viktor Deryabkin	United Russia	91,832	44.69%
Oleg Pakholkov	A Just Russia	42,302	20.59%
Aleksandr Dedovich	Communist Party	27,586	13.42%
Sergey Malykhin	Liberal Democratic Party	18,315	8.91%
Aleksey Lyutov	Rodina	5,465	2.66%
Roman Yatsenko	Communists of Russia	5,224	2.54%
Yury Koshelnikov	The Greens	4,458	2.17%
Vyacheslav Stepanenko	Civic Platform	2,504	1.22%
Total		205,492	100%

=== 2021 ===
Summary of the 17-19 September 2021 Russian legislative election in the Volgodonsk constituency
Candidate	Party	Votes	%
Viktor Deryabkin (incumbent)	United Russia	101,422	46.26%
Aleksey Misan	Communist Party	44,774	20.42%
Tatyana Belova	New People	21,645	9.87%
Dmitry Yevseyev	A Just Russia — For Truth	18,617	8.49%
Aleksey Plotnikov	Liberal Democratic Party	14,167	7.53%
Marina Zinchenko	Party of Pensioners	13,027	5.94%
Total		219,258	100%

=== 2026 ===
Summary of the 18-20 September 2026 Russian legislative election in the Ust-Donetsky constituency
Candidate	Party	Votes	%
Yekaterina Stenyakina (incumbent) (Note: redistricted from Shakhty constituency)	United Russia	198,522	55.56%
Aleksey Misan	Communist Party	68,506	19.17%
Tatyana Belova	New People	37,332	10.45%
Sergey Apanovich	A Just Russia	29,075	8.14%
Ilya Cheremisov	Yabloko	18,405	5.15%
Total		357,305	100%
