= Shakhty constituency =

Russian legislative constituency in Rostov Oblast

Shakhty single-member constituency
- Constituency of the Russian State Duma

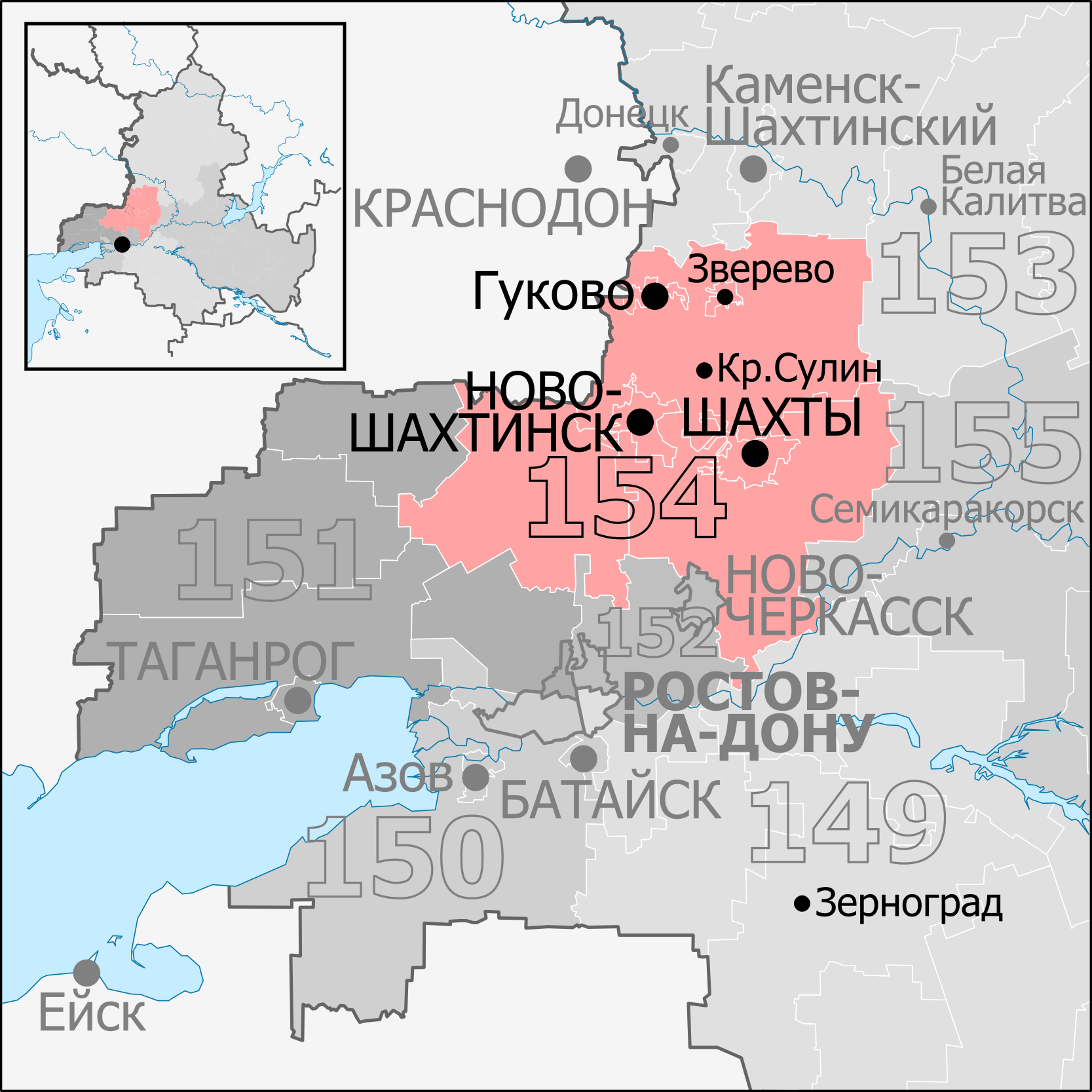
- Constituency boundaries from 2016 to 2026
- Deputy: None
- Federal subject: Rostov Oblast
- Districts: Gukovo, Krasnosulinsky, Novoshakhtinsk, Oktyabrsky, Rodionovo-Nesvetaysky, Shakhty, Zverevo
- Other territory: Israel (Tel Aviv-1)
- Voters: 427,930 (2021)

The Shakhty constituency (No.154 (Note: No.147 in 1993-1995, No.148 in 1995-2007)) was a Russian legislative constituency in Rostov Oblast in 1993–2007 and 2016–2026. The constituency covered most of coal-mining Eastern Donbass. After 2025 redistricting Rostov Oblast lost one of its seven constituencies, so Shakhty constituency was dissolved and partitioned between Neklinovsky, Belaya Kalitva and Ust-Donetsky constituencies.

The constituency was last represented by United Russia deputy Yekaterina Stenyakina, Member of Legislative Assembly of Rostov Oblast, who won the open seat in 2021, succeeding one-term United Russia incumbent Maksim Shchablykin. Stenyakina was re-elected to the State Duma in 2026 in the Ust-Donetsky constituency.

== Boundaries ==
1993–1995: Bagayevsky District, Gukovo, Krasnosulinsky District, Krasny Sulin, Novoshakhtinsk, Oktyabrsky District, Rodionovo-Nesvetaysky District, Shakhty, Ust-Donetsky District, Zverevo
The constituency covered coal-mining Eastern Donbass in western Rostov Oblast, including the cities Gukovo, Krasny Sulin, Novoshakhtinsk, Shakhty and Zverevo.

1995–2007: Gukovo, Krasnosulinsky District, Krasny Sulin, Novoshakhtinsk, Kuybyshevsky District, Rodionovo-Nesvetaysky District, Shakhty, Zverevo
After the 1995 redistricting Rostov Oblast gained the seventh constituency, so all other districts were redrawn. The constituency retained most of its territory, losing Bagayevsky, Oktyabrsky and Ust-Donetsky districts to new Belaya Kalitva constituency. This seat instead gained Kuybyshevsky District to its west from Taganrog constituency.

2016–2026: Gukovo, Krasnosulinsky District, Novoshakhtinsk, Oktyabrsky District, Rodionovo-Nesvetaysky District, Shakhty, Zverevo
The constituency was re-created for the 2016 election and retained almost all of its former territory, losing only Kuybyshevsky District to Taganrog constituency. This seat re-gained Oktyabrsky District from the former Belaya Kalitva constituency.

== Members elected ==
| Election | Member | Party |
|---|---|---|
| 1993 | Ivan Bespalov | Independent |
| 1995 | Vladimir Katalnikov | Independent |
| 1999 | Vladimir Katalnikov | Independent |
| 2003 | Vladimir Katalnikov | Independent |
| 2007 | Proportional representation - no election by constituency | |
| 2011 | Proportional representation - no election by constituency | |
| 2016 | Maksim Shchablykin | United Russia |
| 2021 | Yekaterina Stenyakina | United Russia |

== Election results ==
=== 1993 ===
==== Declared candidates ====
- Ruben Badalov (Independent), former Member of Rostov Oblast Council of People's Deputies (1990–1993), union leader
- Vladimir Bayburtyan (YaBL), bank executive
- Ivan Bespalov (Independent), coal miner, section foreman
- Lev Yapayev (Independent), Head of Novoshakhtinsk Mining Inspection

==== Results ====
Summary of the 12 December 1993 Russian legislative election in the Shakhty constituency
| Candidate | Party | Votes | % |
|---|---|---|---|
| Ivan Bespalov | Independent | 81,056 | 29.15% |
| Ruben Badalov | Independent | 76,836 | 27.63% |
| Lev Lyapayev | Independent | 32,454 | 11.67% |
| Vladimir Bayburtyan | Yavlinsky–Boldyrev–Lukin | 17,360 | 6.24% |
| against all | | 46,504 | 16.72% |
| Total | | 278,104 | 100% |

=== 1995 ===
==== Declared candidates ====
- Aleksandr Aleksandrov (Independent), Rostov State University lecturer
- Ivan Bespalov (CPRF), incumbent Member of State Duma (1994–present)
- Oleg Boyarkin (Independent), trading businessman
- Vladimir Cherednichenko (KRO), chief doctor of the Shakhty city hospital
- Viktor Demyanenko (ROD), cossack ataman
- Yevgeny Dulimov (DOBRo), rector of Don Law Institute
- Vyacheslav Gushchin (K–TR–zSS), ironsmith
- Vladimir Katalnikov (Independent), former Member of Rostov Oblast Council of People's Deputies (1990–1993), union leader
- Vitaly Linnik (NDR), Director of the Rostov Oblast Department of Social Protection (1992–present)
- Viktor Tkachev (LDPR), party secretary in Novoshakhtinsk
- Sergey Shatsky (Independent), Rostov Higher Military Command and Engineering School of Missile Troops faculty deputy head
- Nikolay Shevchenko (Independent), journalist

==== Results ====
Summary of the 17 December 1995 Russian legislative election in the Shakhty constituency
| Candidate | Party | Votes | % |
|---|---|---|---|
| Vladimir Katalnikov | Independent | 90,874 | 32.64% |
| Vitaly Linnik | Our Home – Russia | 43,900 | 15.77% |
| Ivan Bespalov (incumbent) | Communist Party | 40,805 | 14.66% |
| Oleg Boyarkin | Independent | 22,269 | 8.00% |
| Vladimir Kalinko | Congress of Russian Communities | 15,427 | 5.54% |
| Viktor Tkachev | Liberal Democratic Party | 9,056 | 3.25% |
| Vyacheslav Gushchin | Communists and Working Russia - for the Soviet Union | 7,055 | 2.53% |
| Sergey Shatsky | Independent | 7,023 | 2.52% |
| Nikolay Shevchenko | Independent | 6,157 | 2.21% |
| Viktor Demyanchenko | Russian All-People's Movement | 5,551 | 1.99% |
| Yevgeny Dulimov | Education — Future of Russia | 5,388 | 1.94% |
| Aleksandr Aleksandrov | Independent | 4,331 | 1.56% |
| against all | | 14,276 | 5.13% |
| Total | | 278,436 | 100% |

=== 1999 ===
==== Declared candidates ====
- Mikhail Fetisov (Independent), former Chief of Rostov Oblast Militsiya (1990–1999), militsiya lieutenant general
- Vladimir Katalnikov (Independent), incumbent Member of State Duma (1996–present)
- Sergey Khoroshilov (Independent), nonprofit chairman
- Anatoly Osovsky (Independent), electronic engineer
- Vladimir Protsenko (CPRF), aide to State Duma member
- Anatoly Sapronov (Independent), rector of Don State Academy of Service (1997–present)
- Vladimir Sitnikov (Independent), businessman
- Aleksandr Yukhanayev (RSP), businessman

==== Withdrawn candidates ====
- Andrey Gortsevskoy (Independent)
- Dmitry Korotkov (Independent)

==== Failed to qualify ====
- Valentina Kovalenko (LDPR)

==== Did not file ====
- Aleksey Beklemishev (Independent)
- Oleg Boyarkin (Independent), trading businessman, 1995 candidate for this seat
- Gennady Glushchenko (Independent)
- Vitaly Karlov (KRO-Boldyrev), sustainability specialist
- Andrey Plotnikov (PME), power plant worker
- Yury Pokhodeyev (Independent), pensioner
- Gennady Shcherbakov (Independent), Member of Gukovo City Duma (1996–present), corporate executive
- Yury Skiba (Independent)
- Vadim Yeryzhensky (Independent)
- Vitaly Zabelin (Independent)

==== Results ====
Summary of the 19 December 1999 Russian legislative election in the Shakhty constituency
| Candidate | Party | Votes | % |
|---|---|---|---|
| Vladimir Katalnikov (incumbent) | Independent | 96,065 | 36.61% |
| Mikhail Fetisov | Independent | 57,737 | 22.00% |
| Vladimir Protsenko | Communist Party | 43,444 | 16.56% |
| Sergey Khoroshilov | Independent | 21,832 | 8.32% |
| Anatoly Sapronov | Independent | 5,845 | 2.23% |
| Anatoly Osovsky | Independent | 3,753 | 1.43% |
| Aleksandr Yukhanayev | Russian Socialist Party | 3,398 | 1.29% |
| Vladimir Sitnikov | Independent | 2,396 | 0.91% |
| against all | | 23,095 | 8.80% |
| Total | | 262,400 | 100% |

=== 2003 ===
==== Declared candidates ====
- Viktor Anpilov (Independent), chairman of the Labour Russia movement (1992–present), former Member of Moscow City Council of People's Deputies (1990–1993)
- Vitaly Chernyshov (RPP-PSS), chairman of the Russian Party of Pensioners office in Shakhty
- Vladimir Katalnikov (Independent), incumbent Member of State Duma (1996–present)
- Nikolay Kozitsyn (Independent), cossack ataman
- Igor Malikov (Independent), community activist
- Vadim Petriyenko (ORP Rus'), postgraduate student
- Yury Udovichenko (RKRP-RPK), pensioner
- Dmitry Usoltsev (Independent), businessman

==== Did not file ====
- Mikhail Chernenko (DPR), South Russian State Polytechnic University associate professor of mineralogy
- Sergey Kildyushov (Independent), logistics executive
- Aleksandr Levchenko (Independent), pensioner
- Aleksey Obolonkov (Independent), roadheader driver
- Yury Pokhodeyev (Independent), pensioner, 1999 candidate for this seat
- Yury Zatulivetrov (LDPR), pensioner

==== Results ====
Summary of the 7 December 2003 Russian legislative election in the Shakhty constituency
| Candidate | Party | Votes | % |
|---|---|---|---|
| Vladimir Katalnikov (incumbent) | Independent | 89,121 | 44.66% |
| Nikolay Kozitsyn | Independent | 24,372 | 12.21% |
| Viktor Anpilov | Independent | 19,666 | 9.85% |
| Vitaly Chernyshov | Russian Pensioners' Party-Party of Social Justice | 15,515 | 7.77% |
| Igor Malikov | Independent | 7,431 | 3.72% |
| Yury Udovichenko | Russian Communist Workers Party-Russian Party of Communists | 6,785 | 3.40% |
| Dmitry Usoltsev | Independent | 2,230 | 1.12% |
| Vadim Petriyenko | United Russian Party Rus' | 2,129 | 1.07% |
| against all | | 28,206 | 14.13% |
| Total | | 199,868 | 100% |

=== 2016 ===
==== Declared candidates ====
- Sergey Anipko (GP), corporate executive
- Georgy Khugayev (CPCR), perennial candidate
- Nikolay Maslinnikov (A Just Russia), Member of Novoshakhtinsk City Duma (2008–present), individual entrepreneur
- Alfred Minin (The Greens), construction businessman
- Sergey Sarabyev (Patriots of Russia), construction businessman
- Maksim Shchablykin (United Russia), Member of Legislative Assembly of Rostov Oblast (2012–present)
- Gennady Shcherbakov (CPRF), Mayor of Gukovo-Gnilushevskoye (2012–present), 1999 candidate for this seat
- Mikhail Sorokin (LDPR), unemployed
- Aleksandr Tishchenko (Rodina), agriculture executive

==== Results ====
Summary of the 18 September 2016 Russian legislative election in the Shakhty constituency
| Candidate | Party | Votes | % |
|---|---|---|---|
| Maksim Shchablykin | United Russia | 128,865 | 61.92% |
| Gennady Shcherbakov | Communist Party | 24,217 | 11.64% |
| Mikhail Sorokin | Liberal Democratic Party | 22,186 | 10.66% |
| Nikolay Maslinnikov | A Just Russia | 1,197 | 5.38% |
| Georgy Khugayev | Communists of Russia | 5,411 | 2.60% |
| Aleksandr Tishchenko | Rodina | 3,654 | 1.75% |
| Sergey Sarabyev | Patriots of Russia | 2,841 | 1.36% |
| Alfred Minin | The Greens | 2,201 | 1.06% |
| Sergey Anipko | Civic Platform | 1,992 | 0.96% |
| Total | | 208,118 | 100% |

=== 2021 ===
==== Declared candidates ====
- Vladimir Bashmakov (RPSS), pensioner
- Vladimir Kalinin (Yabloko), former Member of Shakhty City Duma (2018–2020), corporate executive
- Konstantin Koshlyakov (RPPSS), blogger
- Aleksandr Kuleshov (New People), architectural designer
- Yury Mezinov (SR–ZP), humanitarian volunteer
- Ilya Ptushkin (LDPR), security businessman
- Sergey Shapovalov (CPRF), Member of Krasny Sulin Assembly of Deputies (2018–present)
- Yekaterina Stenyakina (United Russia), Member of Legislative Assembly of Rostov Oblast (2013–present)

==== Declined ====
- Vladimir Lakunin (United Russia), former Senator from Rostov Oblast (2019–2020) (ran on the party list)
- Maksim Shchablykin (United Russia), incumbent Member of State Duma (2016–present)

==== Results ====
Summary of the 17-19 September 2021 Russian legislative election in the Shakhty constituency
| Candidate | Party | Votes | % |
|---|---|---|---|
| Yekaterina Stenyakina | United Russia | 90,608 | 48.17% |
| Sergey Shapovalov | Communist Party | 37,068 | 19.70% |
| Yury Mezinov | A Just Russia — For Truth | 16,163 | 8.59% |
| Aleksandr Kuleshov | New People | 9,691 | 5.15% |
| Konstantin Koshlyakov | Party of Pensioners | 8,621 | 4.58% |
| Ilya Ptushkin | Liberal Democratic Party | 8,550 | 4.55% |
| Vladimir Kalinin | Yabloko | 6,498 | 3.45% |
| Vladimir Bashmakov | Russian Party of Freedom and Justice | 6,280 | 3.34% |
| Total | | 188,085 | 100% |
