= Ust-Donetsky =

Ust-Donetsky (masculine), Ust-Donetskaya (feminine), or Ust-Donetskoye (neuter) may refer to:

- Ust-Donetsky District, a district of Rostov Oblast, Russia
- Ust-Donetsky (urban-type settlement), an urban locality (a work settlement) in Rostov Oblast, Russia
