= Zavetny =

Set index of articles associated with the same name

Zavetny (Russian: Заветный; masculine), Zavetnaya (Заветная; feminine), or Zavetnoye (Заветное; neuter) is the name of several rural localities in Russia:

- Zavetny (rural locality), a settlement in Zavetny Rural Okrug under the administrative jurisdiction of the City of Armavir, Krasnodar Krai
- Zavetnoye, Krasnodar Krai, a settlement in Protichkinsky Rural Okrug of Krasnoarmeysky District of Krasnodar Krai
- Zavetnoye, Leningrad Oblast, a logging depot settlement in Sevastyanovskoye Settlement Municipal Formation of Priozersky District of Leningrad Oblast
- Zavetnoye, Primorsky Krai, a selo in Chuguyevsky District of Primorsky Krai
- Zavetnoye, Rostov Oblast, a selo in Zavetinskoye Rural Settlement of Zavetinsky District of Rostov Oblast
- Zavetnoye, Saratov Oblast, a selo in Volsky District of Saratov Oblast
- Zavetnoye, Stavropol Krai, a selo in Zavetnensky Selsoviet of Kochubeyevsky District of Stavropol Krai
