= House with an owl =

- Дом с совой (Russian)
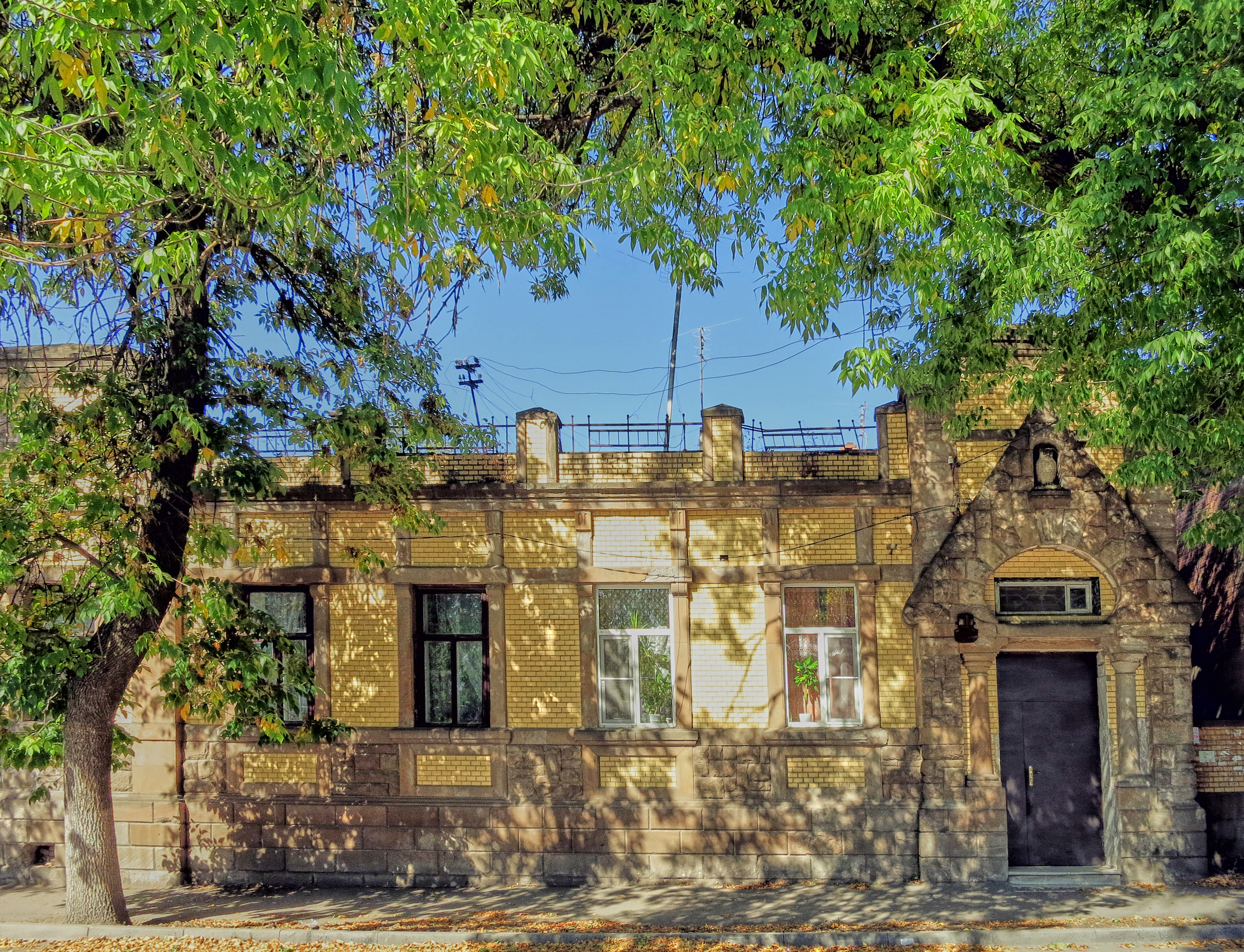
- A picture of House with an owl.
- Interactive map of the House with an owl area

General information
- Architectural style: Modern
- Location: Novocherkassk, Russia
- Coordinates: 47°25′04″N 40°05′59″E
- Completed: 1910

House with an owl (Dubovskogo Street 8) is an apartment house in the modernist style in Novocherkassk, in Rostov Oblast, Russia. It is located at the junction of Sovetskaya and Dubovskogo streets.

== Description ==
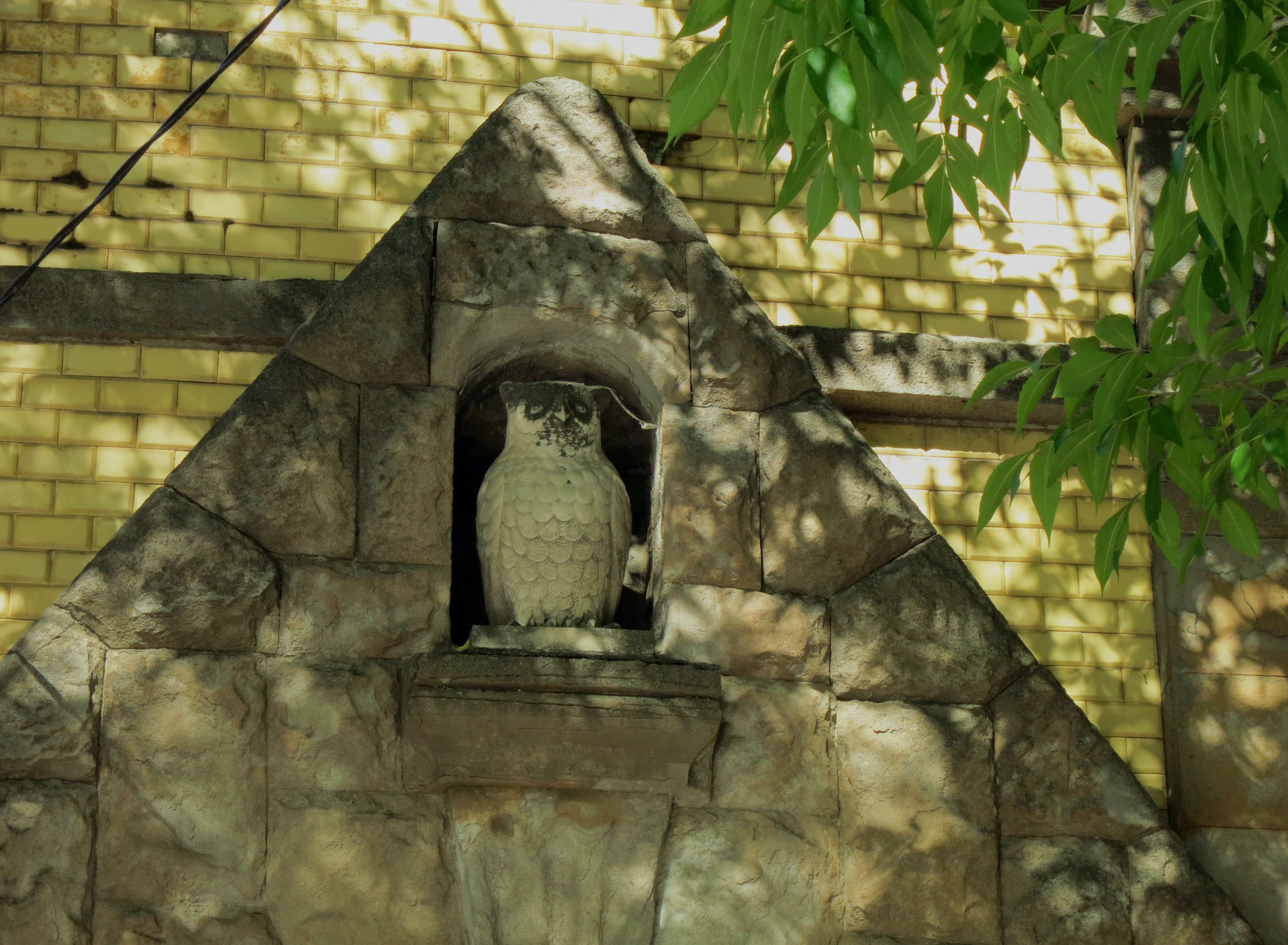
Marble owl above the house entrance.

The house was built in 1910 and was the property of G. G. Krivtsov, head of a mutual loan company, and then M. M. Grishin (1891-1979), a professor at South Russian State Polytechnic University.

V.I. Kulishov, an art critic, called the architectural style of this residential building, which closes up the outlook of Atamanskaya street, "Finnish modern". The reason for this description was the combination in the facade decoration of materials very different in terms of texture, which was typical for northern countries: a wild stone bordering the entrance portal, the lower plinth part of the floor and glazed tiles covering the wall surface.

The house owes its name to the sculpture of a marble owl, a symbol of family well-being and happiness, inserted into the groove of the pointed gable above the entrance. The contrast of the glossy olive surface of the tile and the roughly machined gray stone was often found in medieval architecture.

It is this house that appears in the novel Novocherkassk by G. A. Semenikhin, but at a different address.
