= Monument to Ivan Dokunin =

- Russian: Памятник Ивану Докунину
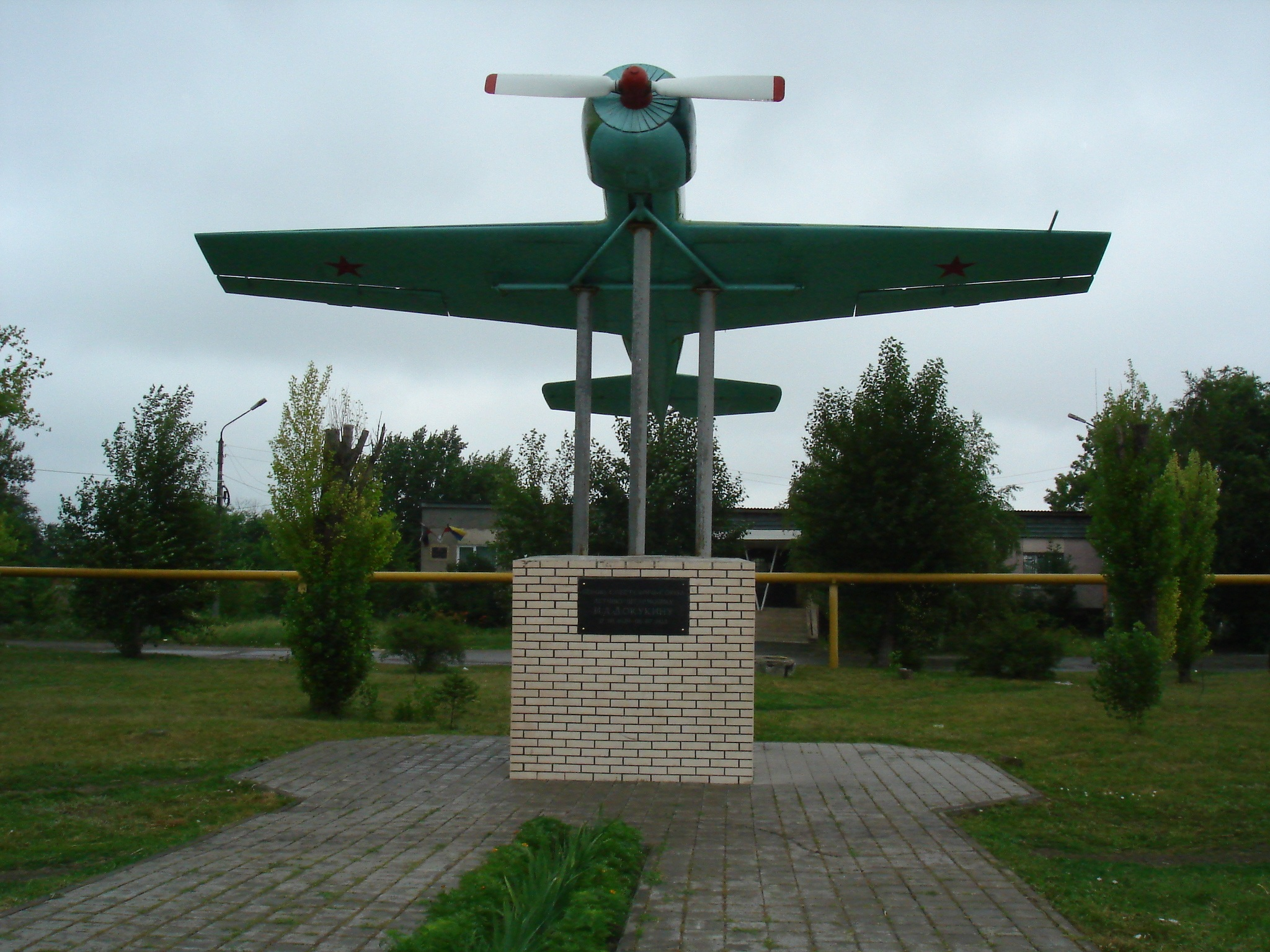
- Interactive map of Monument to Ivan Dokunin
- Location: Sovetskaya street in Zverevo, Rostov Oblast, Russia
- Coordinates: 48°01′42.3″N 40°07′09.9″E
- Designer: Yelena Zubkova
- Type: Monument
- Material: Metal, granite
- Opening date: 2010
- Location in Russia

Monument to Ivan Dokunin (Russian: Памятник Ивану Докунину) is a monument in Zverevo, Rostov oblast, Russia. It is dedicated to the Hero of the Soviet Union Ivan Dokunin, who has died in an air fight above Mius River in the Donbas during the Great Patriotic war.

It consists of a mockup of the trainer aircraft Yakovlev Yak-52 installed on the pedestal. The plane was manufactured at Shakhty Aviation Repair Plant. Installation works was completed in April 2010 on the ever of the Victory Day celebration. The opening ceremony took place on May 6, 2010.

Mayor of Zverevo A. Chumakov was the initiator of this project. The memorial was designed by a local artist Yelena Zubkova. The monument is located at Dokunin's burial site. It also perpetuated the Soviet soldiers fallen and buried here.

== Historical background ==
Ivan Dokunin was enlisted in the Workers' and Peasants' Red Army in June 1941 after the Serpukhov Military Aviation School graduation. Young aviator with his battlefield companions had successfully attacked and destroyed tanks, artillery guns, firing points, troop transports, funk holes of the Wehrmacht, airports occupied by the Luftwaffe, battalions of the hostile infantry. Dokunun made the highest number of flights in his military base, executed battle drills under adverse weather and in poor visibility, when the enemy expected the air strike least of all. Resolution of the Presidium of the Supreme Soviet of February 8, 1943 for the exemplary performance of battle missions, brave actions, heroism Ivan Dokunin received the title of the Hero of the Soviet Union with the awarding of the Order of Lenin and Gold Star. The aviator was killed in battle in Summer 1943. He was buried in a common grave.
