= Pukhlyakovsky =

Set index of articles associated with the same name

Pukhlyakovsky (Russian: Пухляковский; masculine), Pukhlyakovskaya (Пухляковская; feminine), or Pukhlyakovskoye (Пухляковское; neuter) is the name of several rural localities in Rostov Oblast, Russia:

- Pukhlyakovsky, Ust-Donetsky District, Rostov Oblast, a khutor in Pukhlyakovskoye Rural Settlement of Ust-Donetsky District
- Pukhlyakovsky, Verkhnedonskoy District, Rostov Oblast, a khutor in Kazanskoye Rural Settlement of Verkhnedonskoy District
