= Yekaterina Stenyakina =

Russian politician

- Екатерина Стенякина
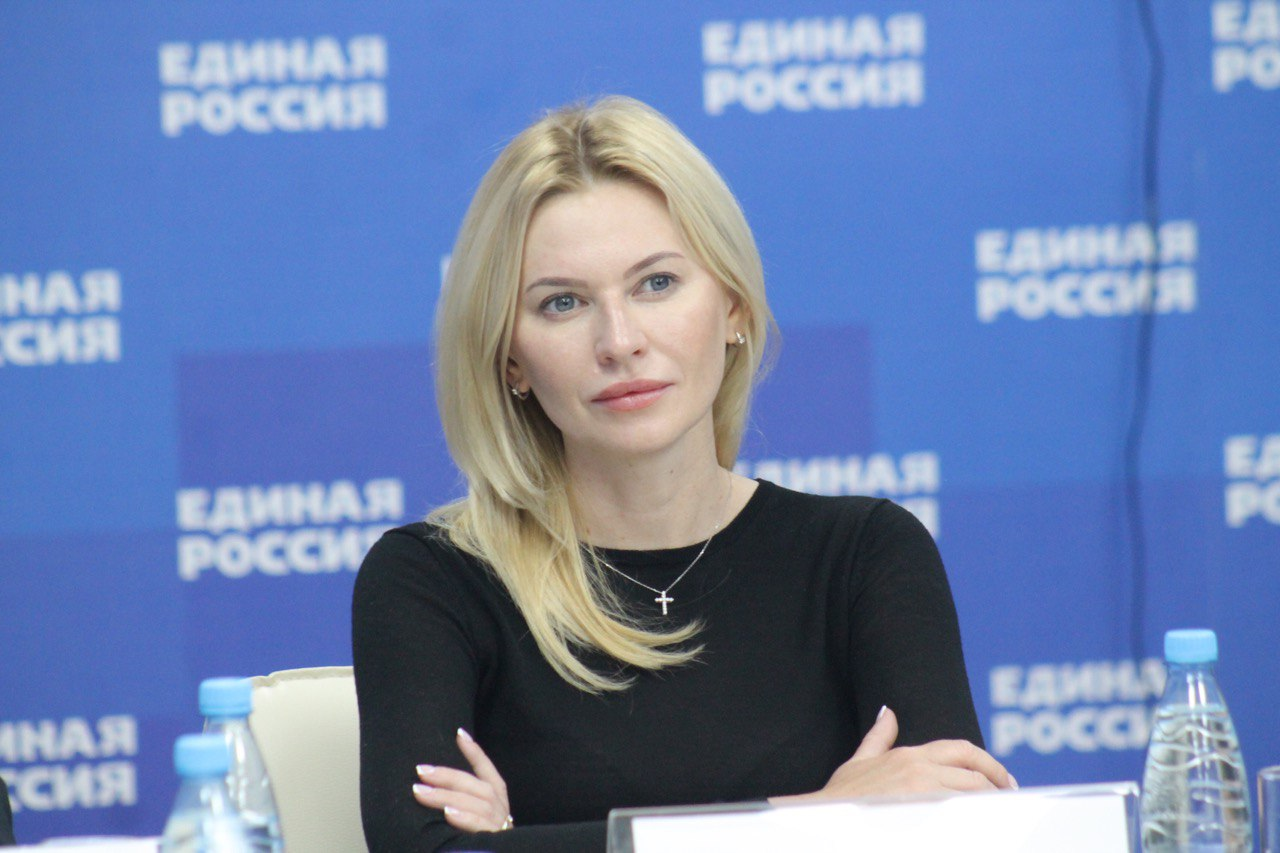

Member of the State Duma for Rostov Oblast
- Incumbent
- Assumed office 12 October 2021
- Preceded by: Maksim Shchablykin
- Constituency: Shakhty (No. 154)

Personal details
- Born: 4 May 1985 (age 41) Shakhty, Rostov Oblast, Russian SFSR, Soviet Union
- Party: United Russia
- Education: South Russian State Polytechnic University

Ekaterina Petrovna Stenyakina (Russian: Екатерина Петровна Стенякина; May 4, 1985, Shakhty, Rostov Oblast) is a Russian political figure, deputy of the 8th State Duma.

From 2005 to 2007, she worked as a technician at the Shakhty branch of the South Russian State Polytechnic University. From 2008 to 2009, Stenyakina served as assistant to the deputy of the Legislative Assembly of Rostov Oblast. In 2016-2018, Stenyakina was the Chairman of the Committee on Youth Policy, Physical Culture, Sports and Tourism. On September 14, 2018, she was elected Chairman of the committee of the Legislative Assembly of the Rostov region on interaction with public associations, youth policy, physical culture, sports and tourism. Since September 2021, she has served as deputy of the 8th State Duma.
