= Viktor Deryabkin =

Russian politician (born 1954)

- Виктор Дерябкин
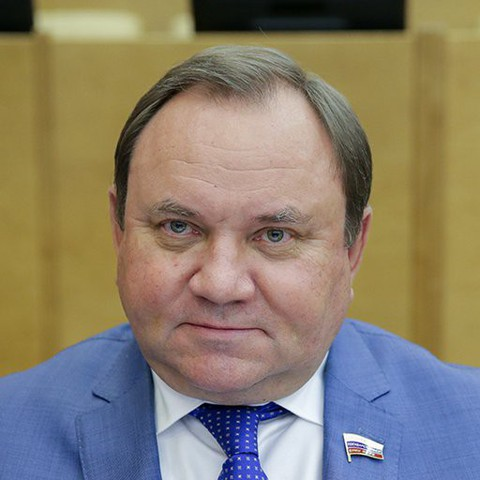

Member of the State Duma for Rostov Oblast
- Incumbent
- Assumed office 5 October 2016
- Preceded by: Constituency re-established
- Constituency: Volgodonsk (No. 155)

Personal details
- Born: 11 May 1954 (age 72) khutor Bolshe-Napolovsky, Sholokhovsky District, Russian SFSR, Soviet Union
- Party: United Russia
- Education: Rostov-on-Don Maritime College

Viktor Efimovich Deryabkin (Russian: Виктор Ефимович Дерябкин; born 11 May 1954, stanitsa Arkhonskaya, Prigorodny District, North Ossetia–Alania) is a Russian political figure and a deputy of the 7th and 8th State Dumas.

In 1983 when Deryabkin was appointed the deputy secretary of the Party Committee of the Volga-Don River Shipping Company. From 1988 to 1990, he worked as an instructor and the chief organizer of the Rostov Regional Party Committee. In 1997, he was appointed head of the administration of the Proletarsky District. In 2002, he became deputy head of the administration of the Rostov Region.

In 2016, he was elected deputy of the 7th State Duma from the Volgodonsk constituency. In September 2021, he was re-elected for the 8th State Duma.

== Legislative activity ==
From 2016 to 2019, during his tenure as a deputy of the State Duma of the 7th convocation, he co-authored 21 legislative initiatives and amendments to draft federal laws.

Together with State Duma deputy and United Russia faction member Igor Stankevich, he co-authored a hastily introduced bill in December 2020 on regulating the betting market. The proposal was highly controversial and caused a wave of disagreements within ministries and among deputies. The deputies suggested reducing deductions for sports and transferring control over these deductions to a public law company, which was to establish a private financial entity to replace the structures licensed by the Central Bank. It was also noted that a number of provisions of the bill contradicted Russian legislation. The bill on regulating the betting market became one of the few controversial manifestations of Deryabkin’s legislative activity.

== Awards ==
- Order “For Merit to the Rostov Region” (April 22, 2024).
- Commendation of the President of the Russian Federation (April 7, 2017) — for active participation in the social and political life of Russian society.

== Sanctions ==
He was sanctioned by the UK government in 2022 in relation to the Russo-Ukrainian War.
