= Church of the Nativity (Nizhnekundryuchenskaya) =

Russian Orthodox Church in Nizhnekundryuchenskaya, Ust-Donetsky, Rostov, Russia

Coordinates: 47.744°N 40.9476°E

Religion
- Affiliation: Russian Orthodox

Location
- Location: Nizhnekundryuchenskaya stanitsa, Ust-Donetsky District, Rostov Oblast, Russia
- Interactive map of Church of the Nativity

Architecture
- Architect: Ivan Rodomsky
- Completed: 1906

Church of the Nativity Of Christ (Russian: Храм Рождества Христова) ― is a Russian Orthodox church in Nizhnekundryuchenskaya stanitsa, Ust-Donetsky District, Rostov Oblast, Russia. It belongs to Volgodonsk diocese of Moscow Patriarchate and was built in 1906. According to some sources, it is also the largest rural Orthodox church in Europe.

== History ==
Nizhnekundruchenskaya was one of the richest villages in the entire Don Host Oblast. At the beginning of the twentieth century, it had a population of about 7,000 inhabitants.

The Church of the Nativity Of Christ was the third church built in the village. In the 18th century there had already been built another two wooden churches.

It was decided to build a new church out of brick. In 1902, under the guidance of the architect and chief builder Ivan Rodomsky, the construction work began. At first, 4,000 four-meter piles for the foundation were hammered, and this laborious work took about a year. Nevertheless, in general, the work progressed very quickly, as almost all of the villagers participated in it.

On October 12, 1906 the church was consecrated by Archpriest Vasily Ilyinsky.

In the 1930s the Soviet authorities made several attempts to close the church, but faced opposition from local residents. In 1933 a detachment of NKVD soldiers dispersed the defenders, and arrests followed. The church was closed and looted and its bells were sent for remelting.

During the Second World War, services in the church resumed. However, in 1961 the church was closed again and its premises were used as a sports hall, and then it was turned into a collective farm warehouse.

In 1990 the church was opened again and in the same year a work began on its restoration, which lasted until 2008.

== Exterior and interior ==
The church has three altars: the main one is consecrated in honor of the Nativity of Christ, the northern one - in honor of the Holy Trinity, the southern one - in honor of Our Lady of Kazan.

The building occupies an area of 940 square meters, the height of the walls is 56 meters, the height from the ground to top of the cross is 76 meters. The walls and ceiling inside are not painted.
