= Remontnoye =

Rural locality in Rostov Oblast, Russia

Coordinates: 46°33′39″N 43°39′24″E

Remontnoye (Russian: Ремонтное) is a rural locality (a selo) and the administrative center of Remontnensky District, Rostov Oblast, Russia. Population: 7,198 (2010 census); 7,385 (2002 census); 7,665 (1989 Soviet census).

== Climate ==
Climate data for Remontnoye (extremes 1948-present)
Month	Jan	Feb	Mar	Apr	May	Jun	Jul	Aug	Sep	Oct	Nov	Dec	Year
Record high °C (°F)	14.2 (57.6)	17.9 (64.2)	27.9 (82.2)	31.5 (88.7)	37.9 (100.2)	41.1 (106.0)	43.2 (109.8)	41.7 (107.1)	39.3 (102.7)	33.8 (92.8)	23.9 (75.0)	17.0 (62.6)	43.2 (109.8)
Mean daily maximum °C (°F)	−0.4 (31.3)	0.9 (33.6)	7.9 (46.2)	16.9 (62.4)	23.9 (75.0)	29.5 (85.1)	32.4 (90.3)	31.7 (89.1)	24.6 (76.3)	16.1 (61.0)	6.5 (43.7)	1.2 (34.2)	15.9 (60.7)
Daily mean °C (°F)	−3.6 (25.5)	−3.0 (26.6)	2.7 (36.9)	10.3 (50.5)	16.9 (62.4)	22.2 (72.0)	24.9 (76.8)	23.9 (75.0)	17.2 (63.0)	10.1 (50.2)	2.6 (36.7)	−1.9 (28.6)	10.2 (50.4)
Mean daily minimum °C (°F)	−6.2 (20.8)	−6.1 (21.0)	−1.1 (30.0)	4.5 (40.1)	10.5 (50.9)	15.2 (59.4)	17.5 (63.5)	16.2 (61.2)	10.8 (51.4)	5.3 (41.5)	−0.5 (31.1)	−4.5 (23.9)	5.1 (41.2)
Record low °C (°F)	−35.0 (−31.0)	−36.1 (−33.0)	−26.7 (−16.1)	−10.5 (13.1)	−5.0 (23.0)	2.4 (36.3)	7.9 (46.2)	4.1 (39.4)	−5.6 (21.9)	−18.4 (−1.1)	−32.2 (−26.0)	−28.9 (−20.0)	−36.1 (−33.0)
Average precipitation mm (inches)	29.1 (1.15)	26.9 (1.06)	33.4 (1.31)	28.3 (1.11)	50.4 (1.98)	48.8 (1.92)	39.9 (1.57)	25.9 (1.02)	36.5 (1.44)	32.7 (1.29)	31.9 (1.26)	31.9 (1.26)	415.7 (16.37)
Source: pogoda.ru.net
