= Zavetnoye, Rostov Oblast =

Zavetnoye Заветное
- Selo
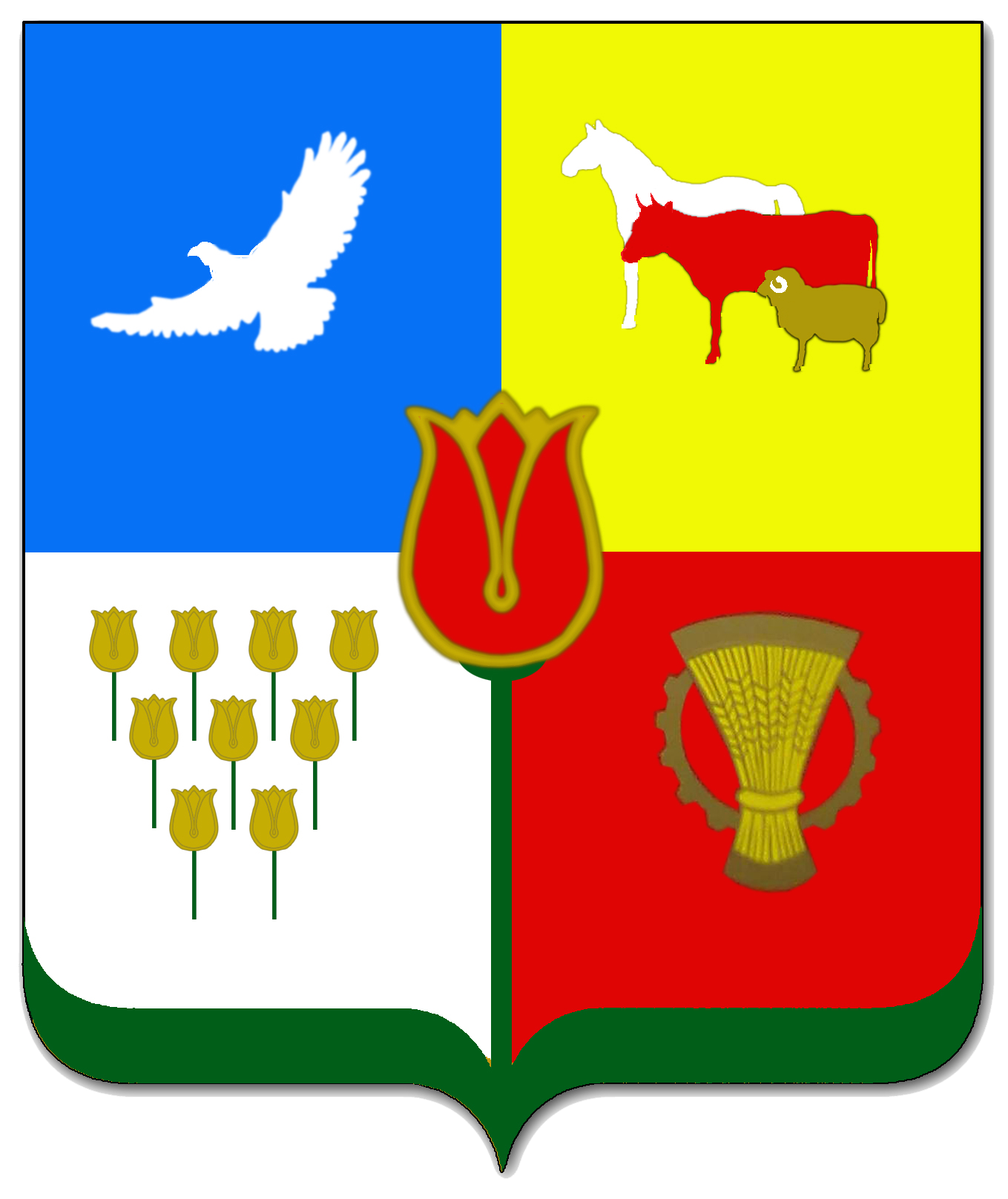
- Coat of arms
- Interactive map of Zavetnoye
- Location of Zavetnoye Zavetnoye (Rostov Oblast)
- Coordinates: 47°07′02″N 43°53′27″E
- Country: Russia
- Federal subject: Rostov Oblast
- Administrative district: Zavetinsky District
- Founded: 1846
- Elevation: 69 m (226 ft)

Population (2010 Census)
  - Total: 6,633
  - Estimate (2021): 6,259 (−5.6%)
- Time zone: UTC+3 (MSK)
- Postal code: 347430
- OKTMO ID: 60617411101

Zavetnoye (Russian: Весёлый) is a rural locality (a selo) in Zavetinsky District of Rostov Oblast, Russia, located 390 kilometers (240 mi) from Rostov-on-Don. Population: 7,079 (2010 census); 6,721 (2002 census).. It is also the administrative center of Zavetinsky District.

== Geography ==
The settlement is situated at the eastern part of Rostov Oblast. The average altitude above sea level is 69 m.

== History ==
The establishment of the village of Zavetnoye is connected with the policy of the tsarist Russian government on the settlement of Kalmyk lands. The governmental instruction of 1846 envisaged the establishment of 28 mixed Kalmyk-Russian villages along roads passing through the Kalmyk Steppe. The first land management of Zavetnoye village was carried out in 1847.

All Russian villages were first settled mostly by peasants from Voronezh and Kharkov governorates, and the influx of settlers increased after the Peasant reform of 1861.

Until 1920, the village had been a part of Astrakhan Governorate. In 1920 its territory was included into Kalmyk Autonomous Oblast. In 1925 it was transferred to Salsky District of North Caucasus Krai.
