= Ust-Donetsky (urban-type settlement) =

Ust-Donetsky Усть-Донецкий
- Urban-type settlement
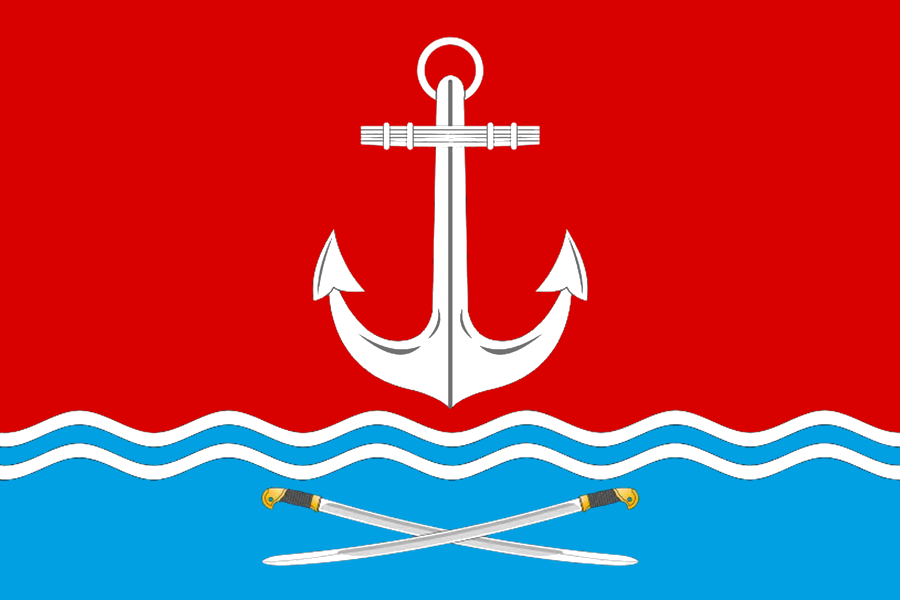
- Flag
- Interactive map of Ust-Donetsky
- Location of Ust-Donetsky Ust-Donetsky (Rostov Oblast)
- Coordinates: 47.6411°N 40.8691°E
- Country: Russia
- Federal subject: Rostov Oblast
- Administrative district: Ust-Donetsky District
- Elevation: 66 m (217 ft)

Population (2010 Census)
  - Total: 11,817
  - Estimate (2022): 10,872 (−8%)
- Time zone: UTC+3 (MSK)
- Postal code: 346550–346551
- OKTMO ID: 60655151051

Ust-Donetsky (Russian: Усть-Донецкий) is an urban locality (an urban-type settlement) in Ust-Donetsky District of Rostov Oblast, Russia. Population: 11,817 (2010 census); 11,374 (2002 census); 10,008 (1989 Soviet census).
