= Remontnensky District =

Remontnensky District Ремонтненский район (Russian)
- District
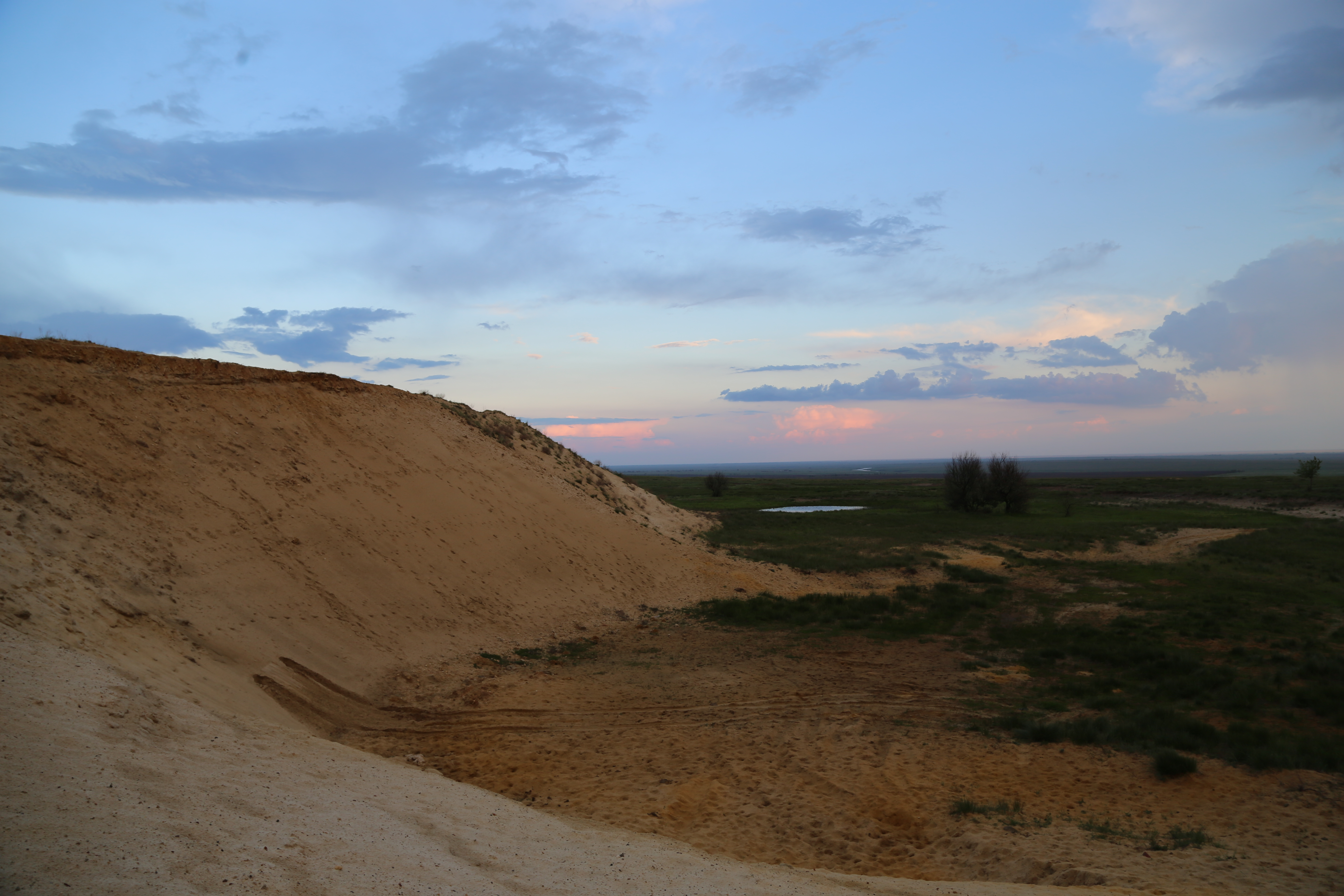
- State Nature Reserve Rostovsky, Remontnensky District

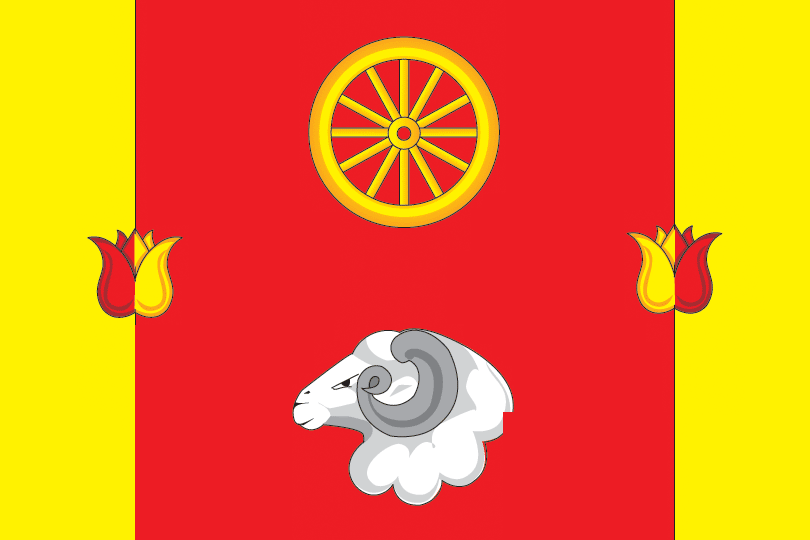
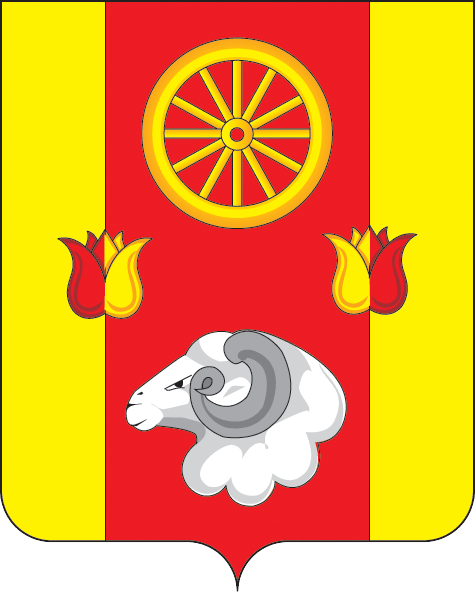
- Flag Coat of arms
- Location of Remontnensky District in Rostov Oblast
- Coordinates: 46°33′47″N 43°39′24″E
- Country: Russia
- Federal subject: Rostov Oblast
- Established: 1926
- Administrative center: Remontnoye

Area
  - Total: 3,779 km^{2} (1,459 sq mi)

Population (2010 Census)
  - Total: 19,152
  - Density: 5.068/km^{2} (13.13/sq mi)
  - Urban: 0%
  - Rural: 100%

Administrative structure
  - Administrative divisions: 10 rural settlement
  - Inhabited localities: 19 rural localities

Municipal structure
  - Municipally incorporated as: Remontnensky Municipal District
  - Municipal divisions: 0 urban settlements, 10 rural settlements
- Time zone: UTC+3 (MSK)
- OKTMO ID: 60647000
- Website: http://remadmin.donland.ru/

Remontnensky District (Russian: Ремо́нтненский райо́н) is an administrative and municipal district (raion), one of the forty-three in Rostov Oblast, Russia. The area of the district is 3,779 square kilometers (1,459 sq mi). Its administrative center is the rural locality (a selo) of Remontnoye. Population: 19,152 (2010 Census); 21,497 (2002 census); 23,202 (1989 Soviet census). The population of Remontnoye accounts for 37.6% of the district's total population.

== Geography ==
The district is located in the southeast of the oblast. The Yergeni hills rise to the east.
