= Zverevo =

Town in Rostov Oblast, Russia

Zverevo Зверево
- Town
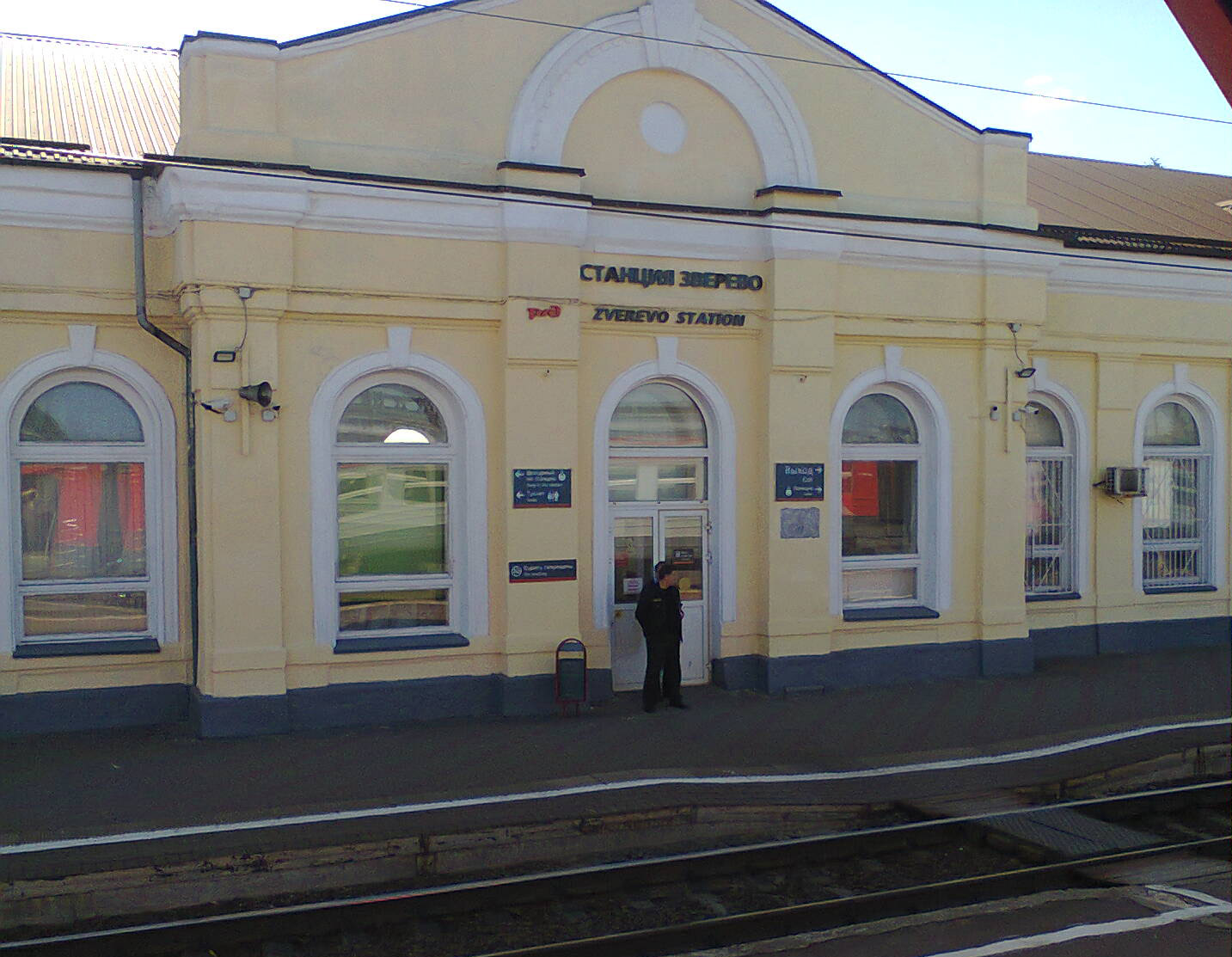
- Zverevo railway station

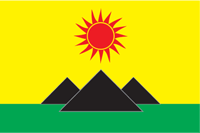
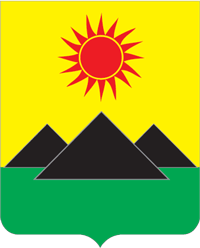
- Flag Coat of arms
- Interactive map of Zverevo
- Location of Zverevo Zverevo (European Russia) Zverevo (Rostov Oblast)
- Coordinates: 48°01′14″N 40°07′21″E
- Country: Russia
- Federal subject: Rostov Oblast
- Founded: 1819
- Town status since: 1989
- Elevation: 240 m (790 ft)

Population (2010 Census)
  - Total: 22,411
  - Estimate (2021): 19,353 (−13.6%)

Administrative status
  - Subordinated to: Zverevo Urban Okrug
  - Capital of: Zverevo Urban Okrug

Municipal status
  - Urban okrug: Zverevo Urban Okrug
  - Capital of: Zverevo Urban Okrug
- Time zone: UTC+3 (MSK)
- Postal code: 346310–346312
- Dialing code: +7 86355
- OKTMO ID: 60718000001

Zverevo (Russian: Зве́рево, Ukrainian: Звірево, romanized: Zvirevo) is a town in Rostov Oblast, Russia, located 140 kilometers (87 mi) northeast of Rostov-on-Don. Population: 22,411 (2010 census); 25,356 (2002 census); 28,206 (1989 Soviet census).

== History ==
Zverevo grew from a mining settlement, which was founded in the beginning of the 20th century. Under its Ukrainian name Zvirevo it was administratively part of the Donets Governorate of Ukraine from 1920 to 1924. It was granted urban-type settlement status in 1929 and town status in 1989.

== Administrative and municipal status ==
Within the framework of administrative divisions, it is, along with one rural locality, incorporated as Zverevo Urban Okrug—an administrative unit with the status equal to that of the districts. As a municipal division, this administrative unit also has urban okrug status.
