= Zavetinsky District =

Zavetinsky District Заветинский район
- District
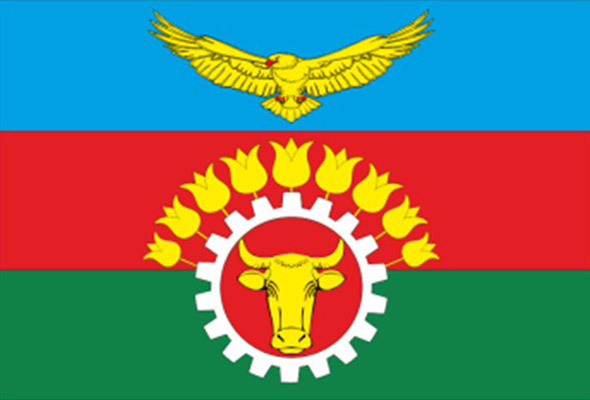
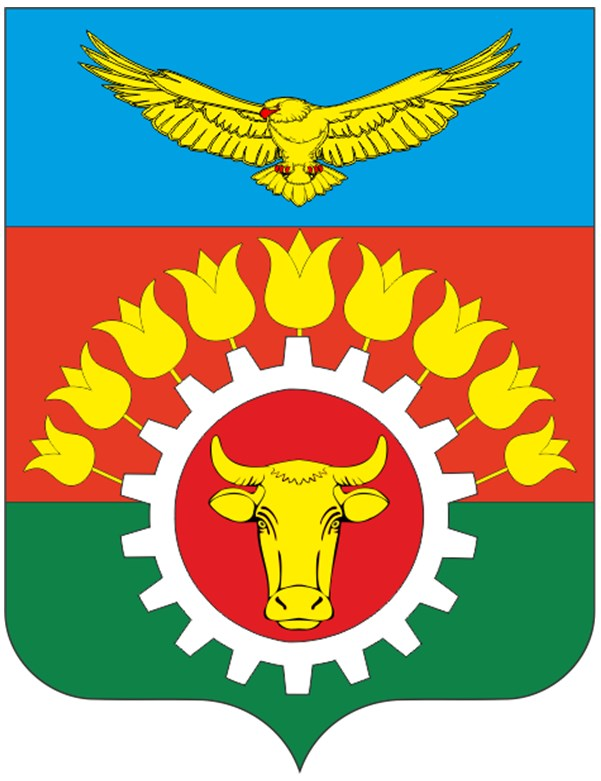
- Flag Coat of arms
- Location of Zavetinsky District in Rostov Oblast
- Coordinates: 47°07′02″N 43°53′27″E
- Country: Russia
- Federal subject: Rostov Oblast
- Established: 1926
- Administrative center: Zavetnoye

Area
  - Total: 3,000 km^{2} (1,200 sq mi)

Population (2010 Census)
  - Total: 17,250
  - Density: 5.8/km^{2} (15/sq mi)
  - Urban: 0%
  - Rural: 100%

Administrative structure
  - Administrative divisions: 9 rural settlement
  - Inhabited localities: 25 rural localities

Municipal structure
  - Municipally incorporated as: Zavetinsky Municipal District
  - Municipal divisions: 0 urban settlements, 9 rural settlements
- Time zone: UTC+3 (MSK)
- OKTMO ID: 60617000
- Website: http://zavetnoe.donland.ru/

Zavetinsky District (Russian: Заве́тинский райо́н) is an administrative and municipal district (raion), one of the forty-three in Rostov Oblast, Russia. The area of the district is 3,000 square kilometers (1,200 sq mi). Its administrative center is the rural locality (a selo) of Zavetnoye. Population: 17,250 (2010 Census); 18,508 (2002 Census); 18,638 (1989 Soviet census). The population of Zavetnoye accounts for 41.0% of the district's total population.

== Geography ==
The district is located in the southeast of the oblast. The Yergeni hills rise to the east.
