= South Russian State Polytechnic University =

Platov South-Russian State Polytechnic University
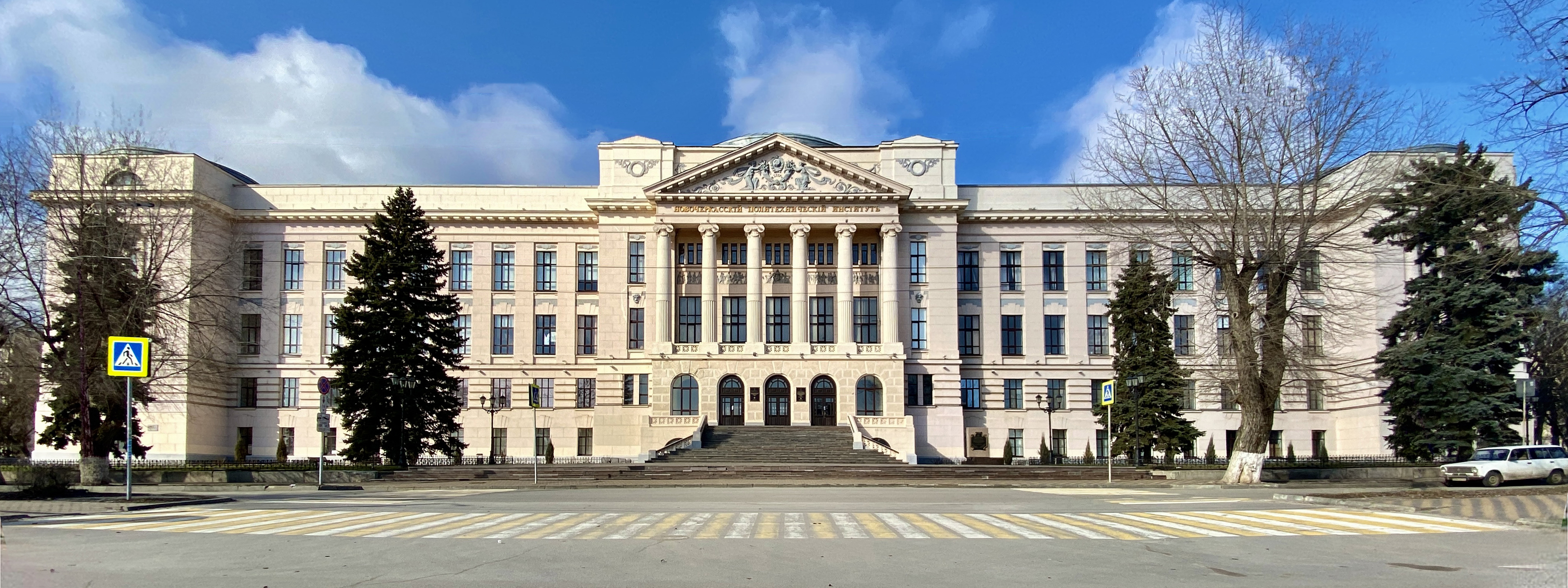
- Platov South-Russian State Polytechnic University (NPI)
- Former names: DPI, ADPI, SKII, SRI, NPI, NSTU, YRSTU (NPI)
- Type: State research university
- Established: 1907; 119 years ago
- Rector: Yuri Ivanovich Razoryonov
- Dean: Nikolay Ivanovich Gorbatenko
- Faculty: 254
- Students: 12,000
- Other students: 700 ^{a}
- Location: Novocherkassk, Rostov Oblast, Russia; 47°25′01″N 40°05′11″E
- Campus: Suburban, 124-acre (0.2 sq mi; 50.2 ha)
- Website: www.npi-tu.ru/en (en) www.npi-tu.ru (ru)^{a} Foreign student

South Russian State Polytechnic University or Platov South-Russian State Polytechnic University (also known as Novocherkassk Polytechnic Institute) is a state university in the city of Novocherkassk, Rostov Oblast, Southern Russia.

== History ==
=== In the Russian Empire ===
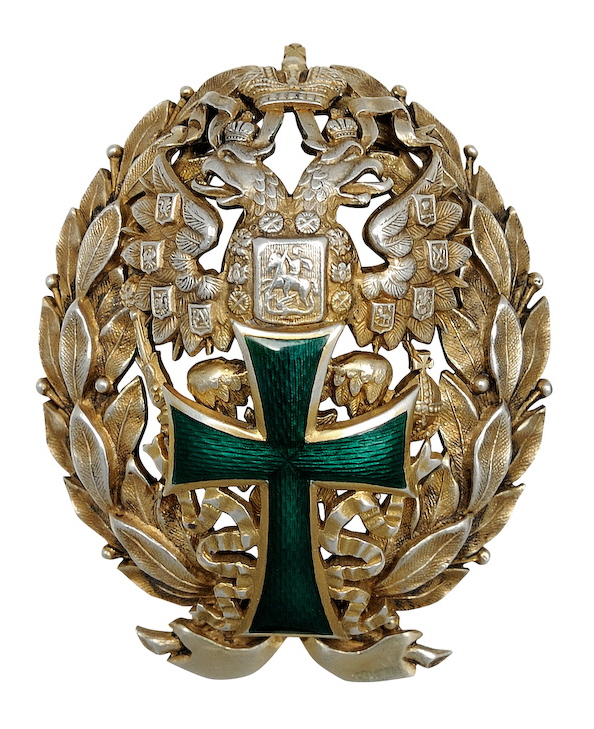
Sign of graduation from the Alekseevsk Don Polytechnic Institute

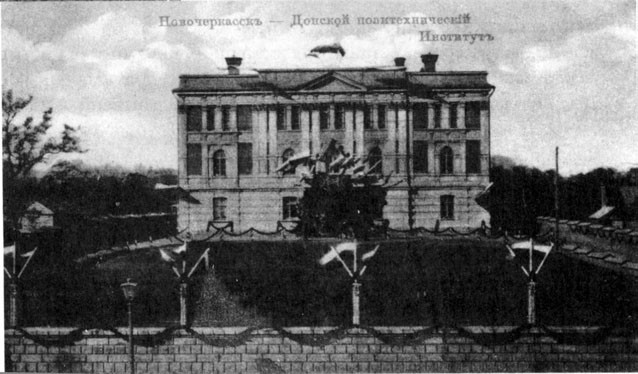
The first building of the Alekseevsk Don Polytechnic Institute, which hosted the opening ceremony

The university during its nascent days were known as the Don higher educational institution. The institution was established with a background of the demands from the local authorities and the public in general for forming a university in the city of Novocherkassk, which started informally around 1870s. Consequently, some student unrest took place during 1905–1906. This event was followed by the approval of the Imperial Regulation of the Council of Ministers on 2 March 1907, and the university was legally established with the aim "to recognize the expediency of the establishment of the Don Polytechnic Institute in the city of Novocherkassk". Initial departments of the university included mining, engineering and melioration, mechanical, and chemical technologies.

On 5 October 1907, the Don Polytechnic Institute started to operate, while becoming the first higher educational institution in the southern part of the Russian Empire. At that time, the institute did not have its own buildings and was collectively operating in seven distinct closely located buildings.

In the year 1909, the institute was named after Tsarevich Alexei, and started to be known as Alekseevsky Don Polytechnic Institute.

On 9 October 1911, construction began for own buildings of the university which were designed by Bronislaw Roguisky. This construction project included the main, robotic (modern name), chemical, mining corps and was finally completed in 1930.

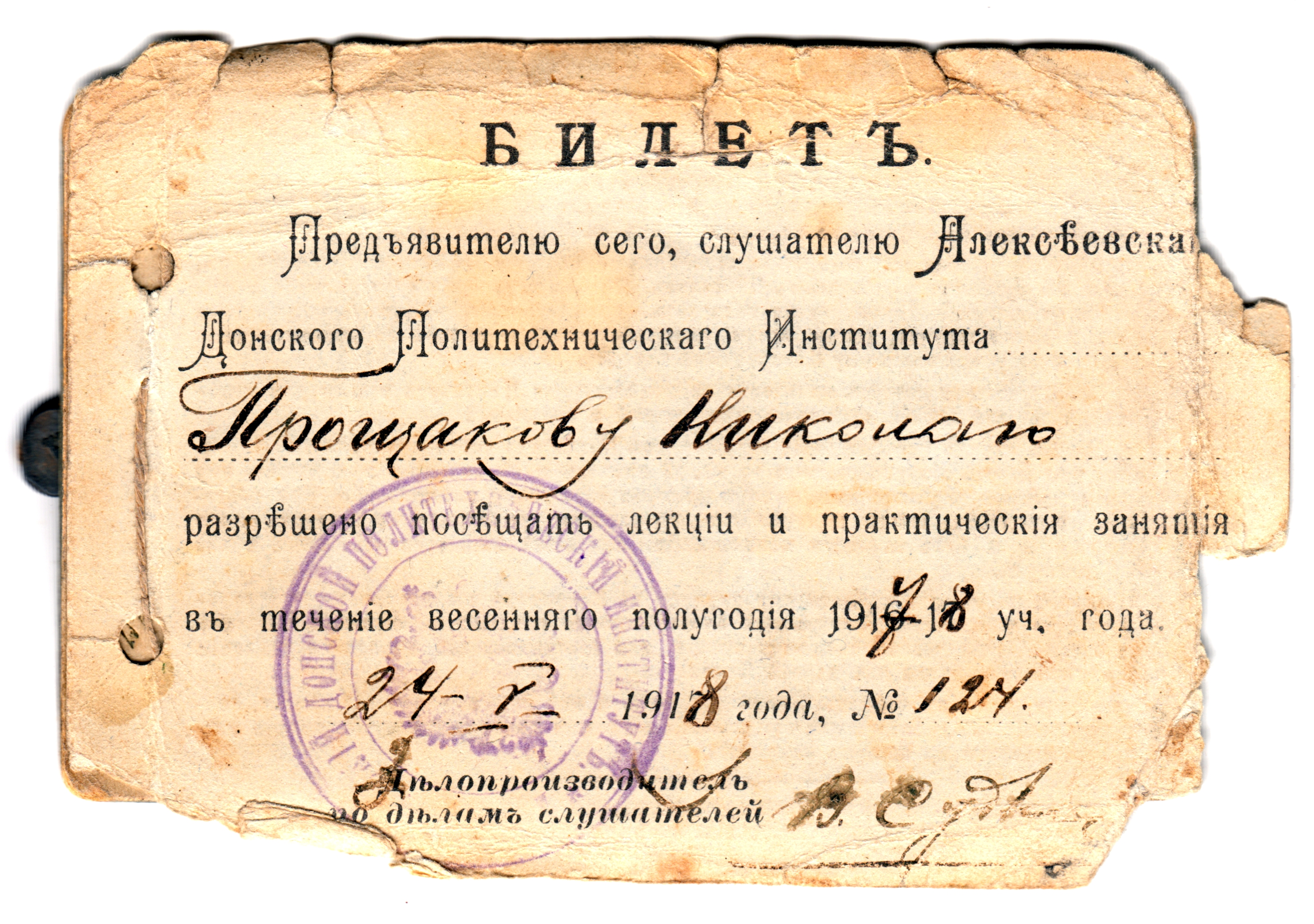
Student card, 1918

=== After 1917 ===
During the years 1918 to 1920, the institution was named after Alexey Kaledin. Then the institution was renamed as Donskoy Polytechnic. In April 1930, the Don Polytechnic Institute was divided into several independent higher technical educational institutions which included:

- Energy
- Checmical Technology
- Geological Exploration
- Civil Engineering
- Aviation Engineering
- Metallurgical
- Agricultural engineering

On 21 March 1933, by order of the then People's Commissar for Heavy Industry Sergo Ordzhonikize, the geological exploration institute, chemical technology institute and energy institute were merged. Due to the result of such merger, the North Caucasian Industrial Institute was formed, which in 1934 was renamed as Novocherkassk Industrial Institute, named after Ordzhonikidze.

University buildings in the 1930s

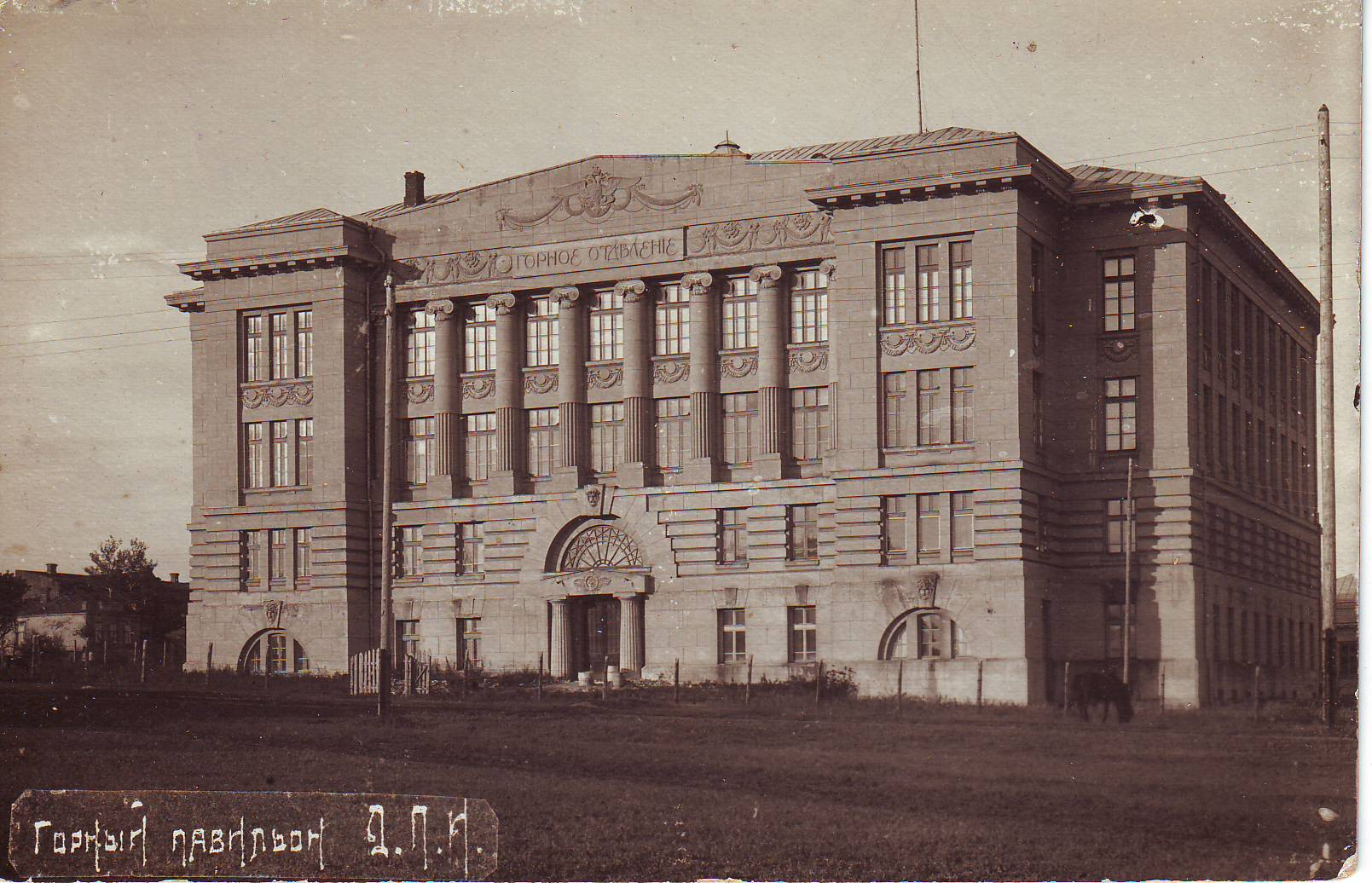
Mining Faculty

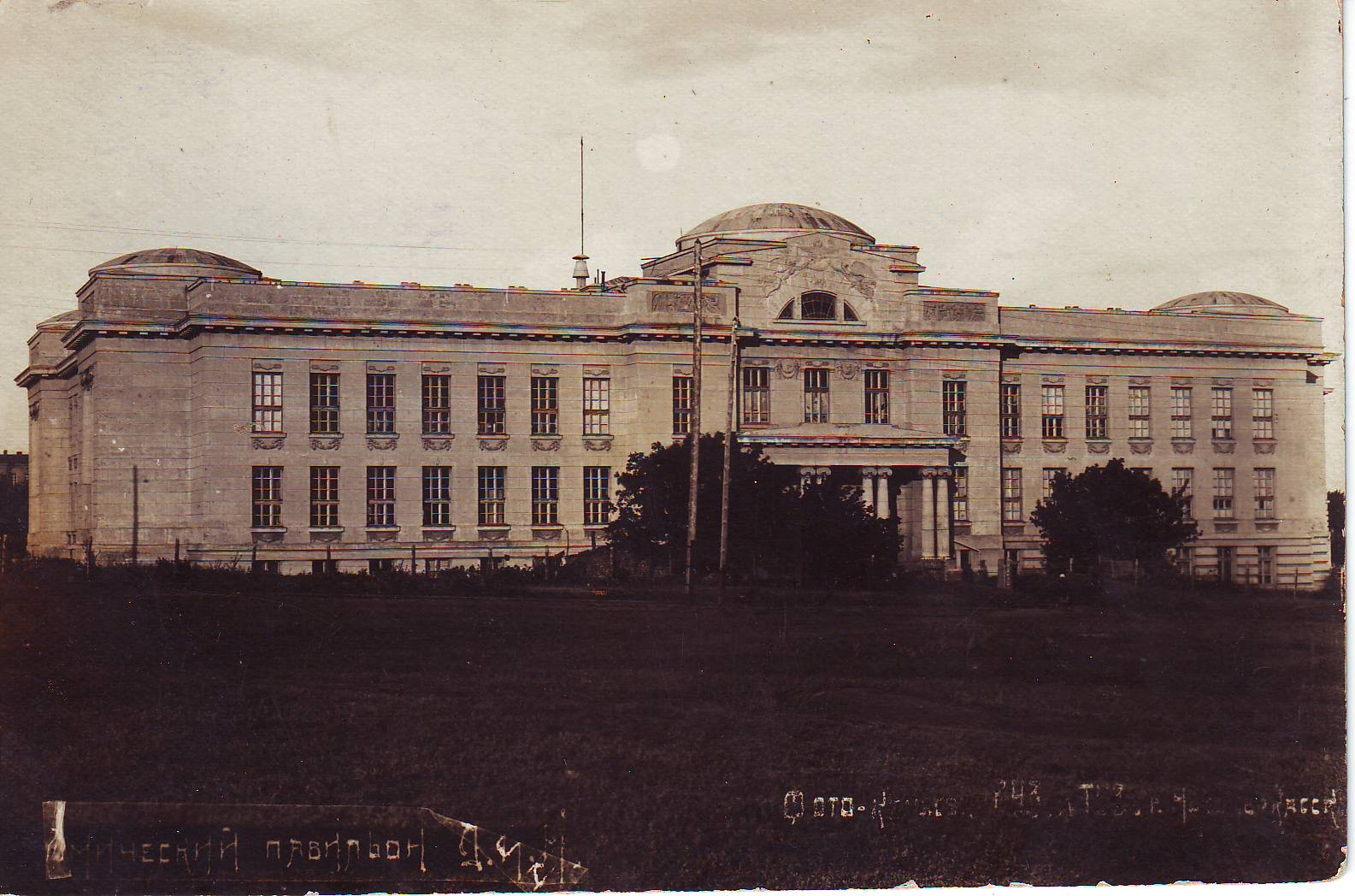
Chemical Faculty

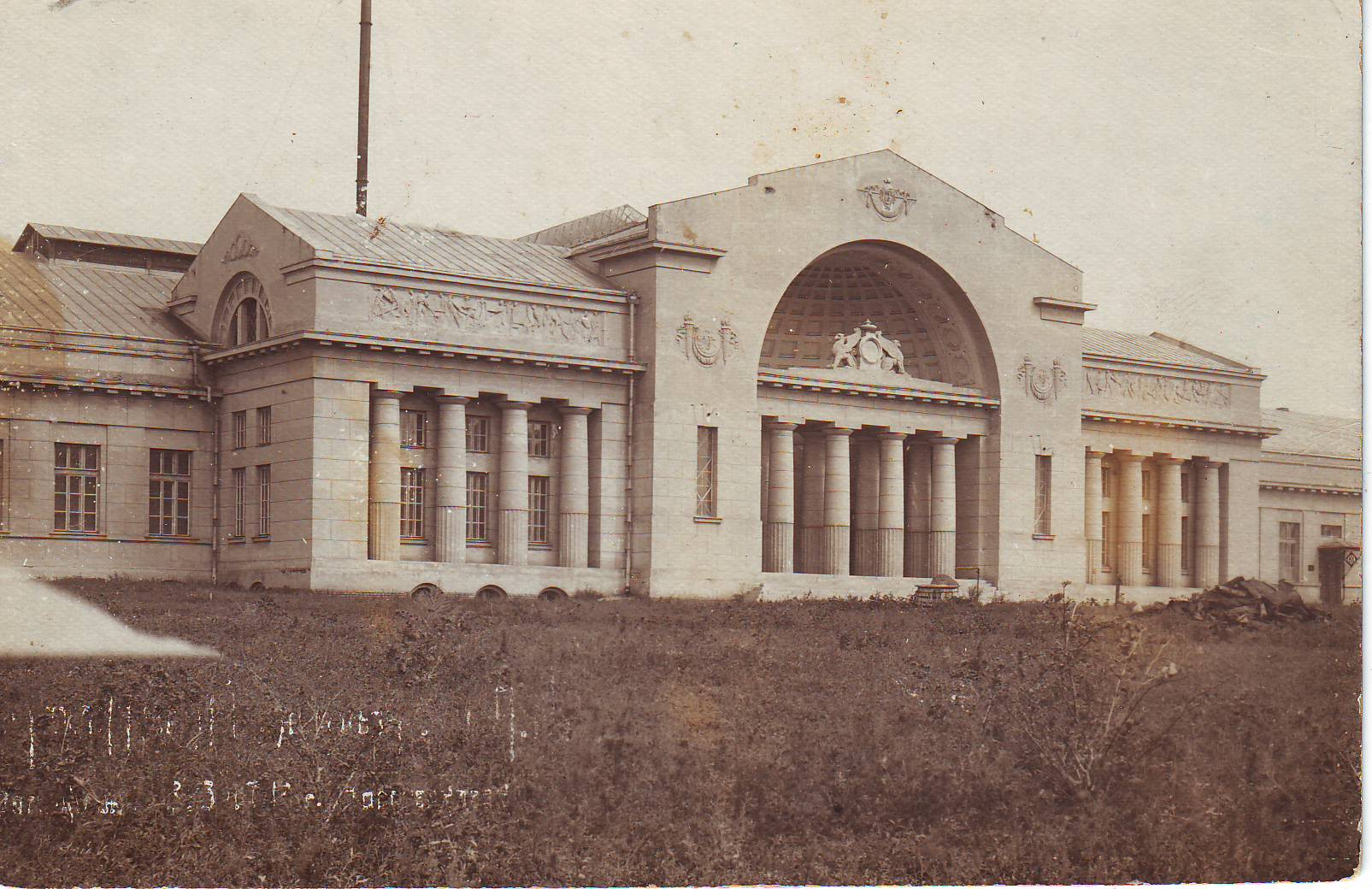
Faculty of Energy

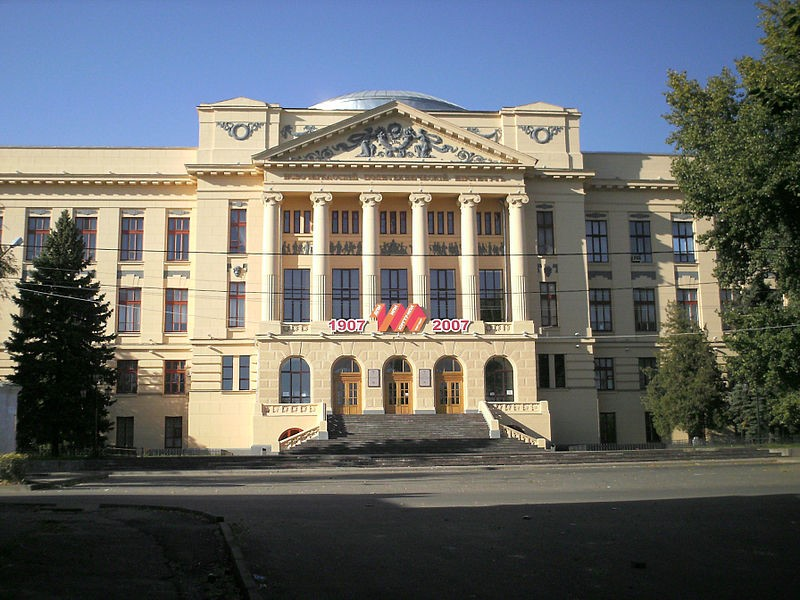
The main building on its 100th anniversary

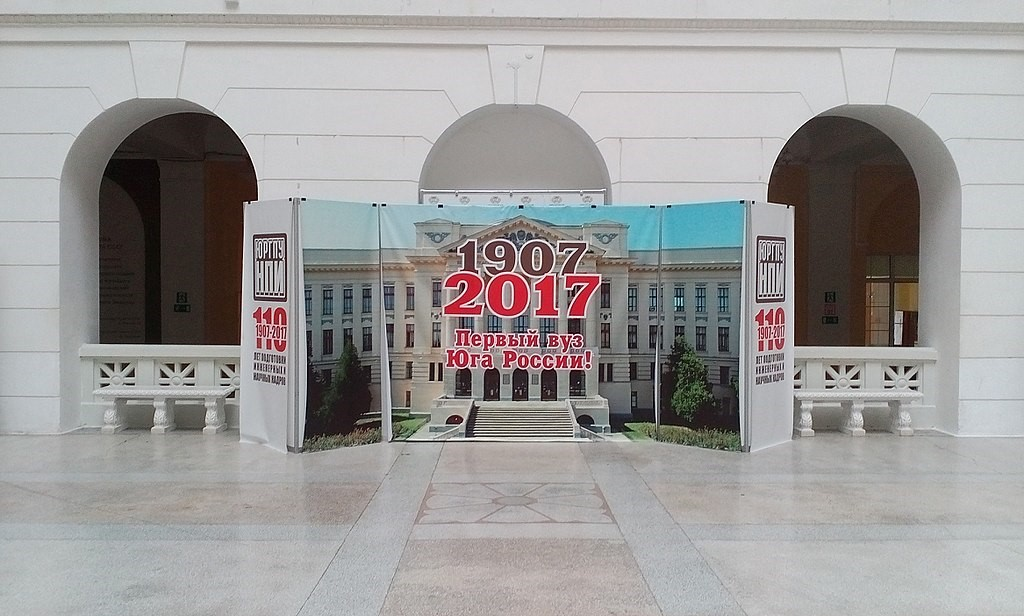
The covered courtyard of the main building on its 110th anniversary

On 27 February 1948, via order No. 264 of the USSR Ministry of Higher Education Department, the institute received a new name – Novocherkassk Polytechnic Institute named after Sergo Ordzhonikidze. This name remained associated with the Institution until 1993.

In 1957, the institute was awarded the Order of the Red Banner of Labor.

On 5 July 1993, by order No. 55 of the State Committee of the Russian Federation for Higher Education Department, the university received a new status and the name was further changed to Novocherkassk State Technical University.

On 2 February 1999, by Order No. 226 of the Ministry of General and Professional Education of the Russian Federation, it was renamed again and this time the new name was South Russian State Technical University (Novocherkassk Polytechnic Institute).

On 19 August 2002, it was enrolled under the Unified State Register of Legal Entities as a state educational institution of higher education while retaining its previous name.

Later it was transformed into a federal state budgetary educational institution of higher professional education (FGBOU VPO), while the name remained unchanged.

On 25 October 2012, order No. 463 was adopted by the Government of the Rostov Region to assign the name of the university after Matvei Platov, which was supported by the petition of the university management dated 8 April 2013 No. 38-3 / 115. Consequently, on 24 June 2013, by order No. 482 of the Ministry of Education and Science of the Russian Federation, the university was decided to be renamed into FSBEI HPE South Russian State Polytechnic University (NPI) commemorating M.I. Platov.

During 18 and 19 October 2007, celebrations took place for marking the 100th anniversary of the oldest university in the southern Russia. On 17 October, the All Russian Exhibition Fair of Research Works and Innovation Activities was inaugurated at the university premises which was dedicated to the 100th anniversary of the foundation of the university. The opening ceremony was attended by the mayor of Novocherkassk, the head of the city duma and the top officials of the university.

External images
- Obverse of the medal to the 100th anniversary
- Reverse medal

Until 2008, there was a presidential governance system at the university, its last president was V.E. Shukshunov

In 2014, the Expert RA agency included the university in its list of the best higher educational institutions of the Commonwealth of Independent States, where it was assigned a rating class "E".

=== Official names over time ===
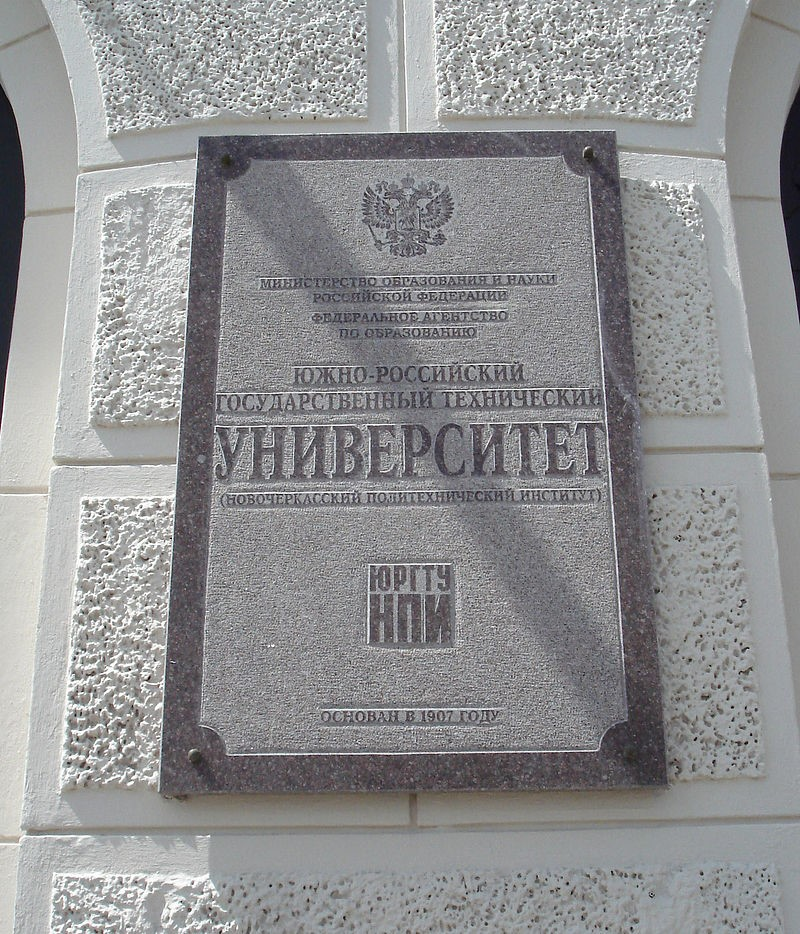
Modern name

- 1907 – Don Polytechnic Institute
- 1909 – Alekseevsky Don Polytechnic Institute, in the honor of Tsarevich Alexei. There was a badge about graduation from the Alekseevsk Don Polytechnic Institute.
- 1918 – Don Polytechnic Institute named after Ataman A.M. Kaledin, in honor of A.M. Kaledin
- 1920 – Don Polytechnic Institute
- 1930 – North Caucasian Industrial Institute, after division into several independent higher technical educational institutions, some of which in 1933 were re-united into a single institute.
- 1934 – Novocherkassk Industrial Institute named after Sergo Ordzhonikidze. For some time the institute existed under the name of the Azov-Black Sea Industrial Institute.
- 1948 – Novocherkassk Polytechnic Institute.
- 1993 – Novocherkassk State Technical University, from 5 July.
- 1999 – South-Russian State Technical University (Novocherkassk Polytechnic Institute), from 2 February.
- 2013 – South-Russian State Polytechnic University (Novocherkassk Polytechnic Institute) named after MI Platov, from 24 June.

=== Rectors ===
The list of Rectors of the university (chronologically as per year of appointment):

# 1907 – Nikolay Zinin
1. 1910 – Nikolai Nikolaevich Zinin
2. 1910 – Yupatov, Ivan Ferapontovich
3. 1917 – Abramov, Nikolay Matveyevich (March)
4. 1917 – Sushchinsky, Pyotr Petrovich
5. 1918 – Abramov, Nikolai Matveyevich (March − May)
6. 1918 – Uspensky, Nikolay Semyonovich
7. 1922 – Sushchinsky, Pyotr Petrovich
8. 1924 – Troitsky, Mikhail Viktorovich
9. 1926 – Sushchinsky, Pyotr Petrovich
10. 1928 – Egorshin, Vasily Petrovich
11. 1929 – Kasatkin, Vasily Nikolaevich
12. 1933 – Parshikov, Ivan Agafonovich
13. 1934 – Shumsky, Efim Grigorievich
14. 1935 – Khaletsky, Illarion Isaevich
15. 1936 – Vlasov, Victor Gavrilovich
16. 1938 – Semchenko, Dmitry Platonovich
17. 1939 – Shilnikov, Kuzma Afinogenovich
18. 1949 – Semchenko, Dmitry Platonovich
19. 1952 – Kobilev, Alexey Grigorievich
20. 1958 – Avilov-Karnaukhov, Boris Nikolaevich
21. 1963 – Frolov, Mikhail Alexandrovich
22. 1974 – Smirnov, Vladimir Alexandrovich
23. 1977 – Goncharov, Semyon Ivanovich
24. 1981 – Shukshunov, Valentin Efimovich
25. 1988 – Taranushich, Vitaly Andreevich
26. 1998 – Lunin, Leonid Sergeevich
27. 2009 – Perederiy, Vladimir Grigorievich
28. 2019 – Razoryonov, Yuri Ivanovich

== Description ==
=== Academic structure of the university ===
- 10 faculties (including the faculty of open distance learning)
- 4 institutes
- 39 departments
- 2 institutes as branches
- 1 college
- inter-sectoral regional center for advanced training and professional retraining of specialists
- 12 research institutes
- 7 research and production enterprises
- publishing organizations and other departments that support the activities of the university

The SRSPU employs 3919 employees, including a teaching staff of 2054.

22,000 students study at its faculties and branches, including more than 15,000 full-time students, about 4,000 part-time students, and about 2,000 part-time education. More than 1,000 students undergo retraining every year.

The university houses the largest university scientific and technical library in the south of Russia. The library fund has more than 3 million publications.

=== Publications ===
- "Personnel of Industry" is a large-circulation newspaper of the YRSPU (NPI). Published since December 1929.
- Scientific and technical journal "News of higher educational institutions. Electromechanics". Published since January 1958.

=== University staff ===
==== Faculty ====
- 255 doctors of sciences, professors
- 1058 candidates of sciences, associate professors
- 13 honored workers of science and technology
- 2 honored cultural workers
- 9 honored workers of higher education
- 109 academicians of industry and public academies
- 1 Corresponding Member of RAS

=== University buildings ===
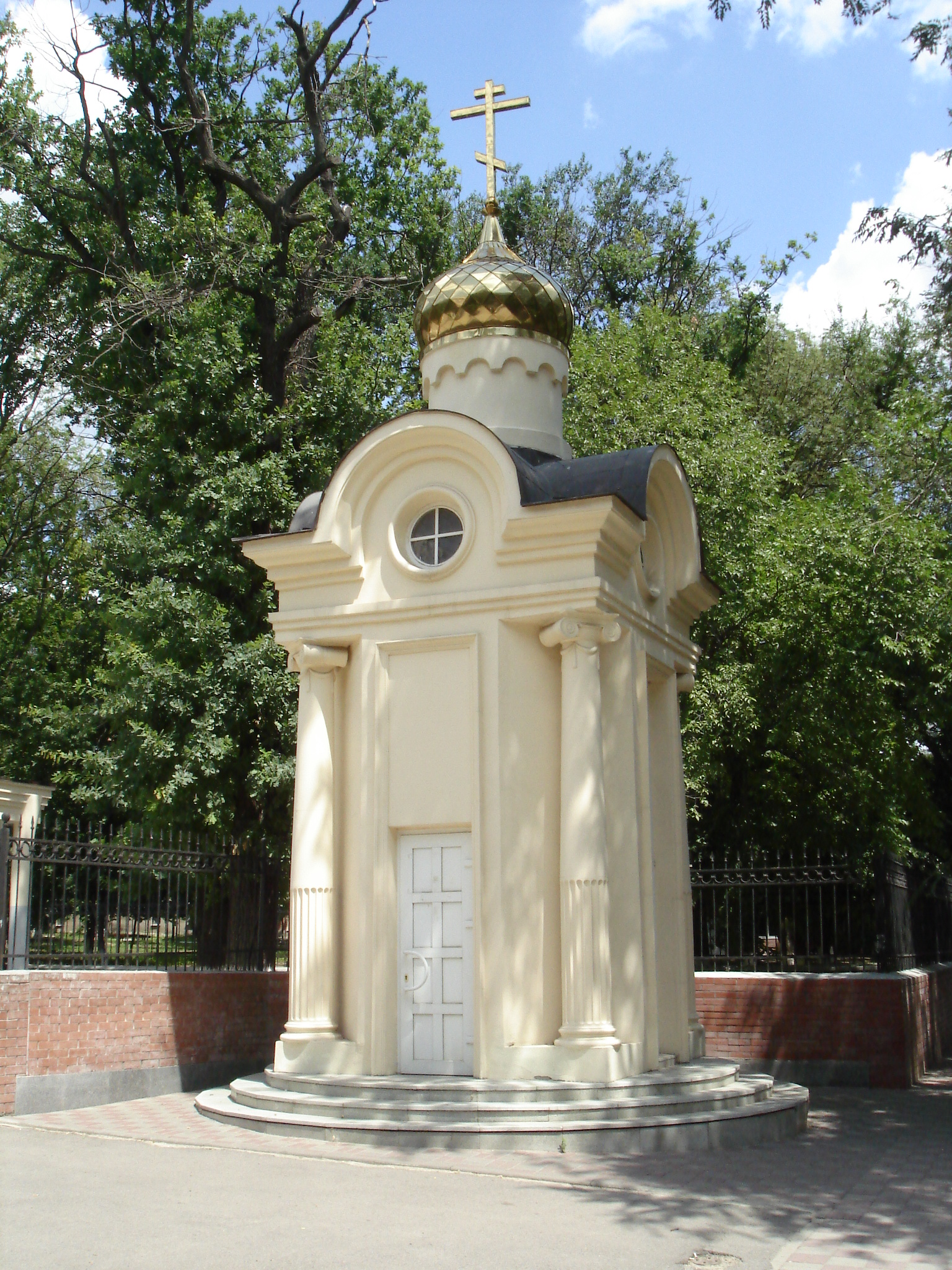
Chapel dedicated to Saint Tatiana, 2013

The campus of the South Russian State Polytechnic University includes:

- Main building
- Robotic building
- Chemical building
- Mountain body
- Energy building
- Laboratory building
- Educational library building (concert hall)
- Sports facilities (stadium, swimming pool, tennis court, gymnasium, athletics arena)

In the twenty-first century, at the right entrance to the territory of the university, a checkpoint and a chapel were built in honor of the patroness of all students – the holy great martyr Tatiana.

=== Anthem ===
The verse of Vladimir Abramovich Schwartz, a member of the university literary group, a 1964 NPI graduate – "I love you, NPI" is considered as the anthem of the university.

== Research work ==
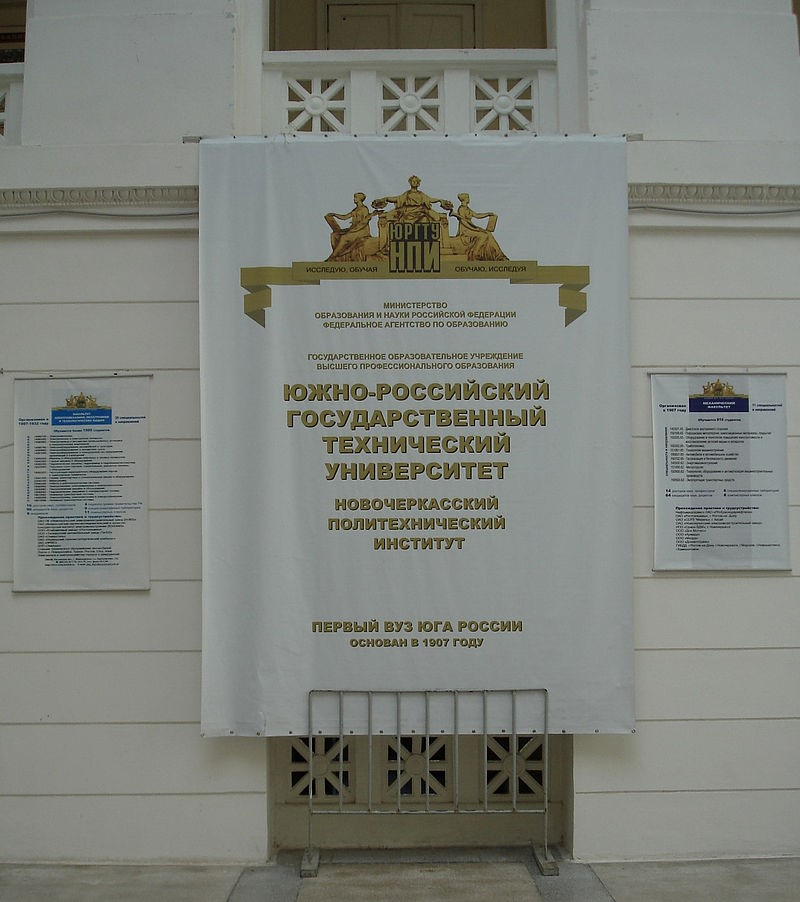
The first university in the south of Russia

The university is known for carrying out research activities in 26 different disciplines including powder metallurgy, theory of ore formation in volcanic sedimentary strata, micrometallurgy of Semiconductor structures, on antifriction materials, polymer synthesis, effective methods for solving problems of mathematical physics, simulator construction and others.

Research and development activities are carried out at different levels which include faculties, branch institutes, workshops (UPPK), Donskoy Technological Park, R&D centers and other divisions of the university. More than ten R&D centres function as part of SRSPU (NPI). Each includes one or more faculties, departments, research institutes (Scientific Research Institute) and other research and manufacturing departments of the university, as well as some non-department organizations, enterprises of the university. Six research institutes operate on the basis of departments, research laboratories, pilot production facilities of the university:

- Research Institute of Energy
- Research Institute of Water Supply and Sanitation
- Research Institute of Electromechanics
- Research Institute of Computing, Information and Control Systems
- Research Institute of the History of the Cossacks and the Development of Cossack Regions
- Center for Collective Use "Nanotechnology"

In 2010, SRSPU took 459th place (a total of 474 universities participated) in the ranking of scientific and publication activity of Russian universities, annually compiled by the Higher School of Economics.

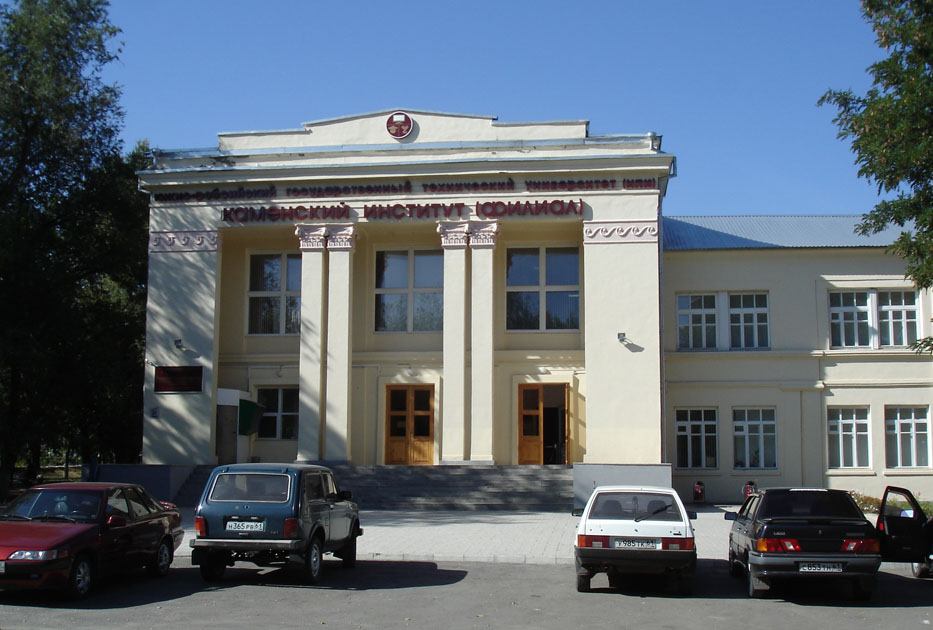
Kamensk branch of YRSPU

== Branches ==
As of 2019, the university included the following branches:

- Bagaevsky branch (recreation center)
- Kamensk Institute (branch) – opened in 1998
- Shakhty Institute (branch) – opened in 1958

== Faculties ==
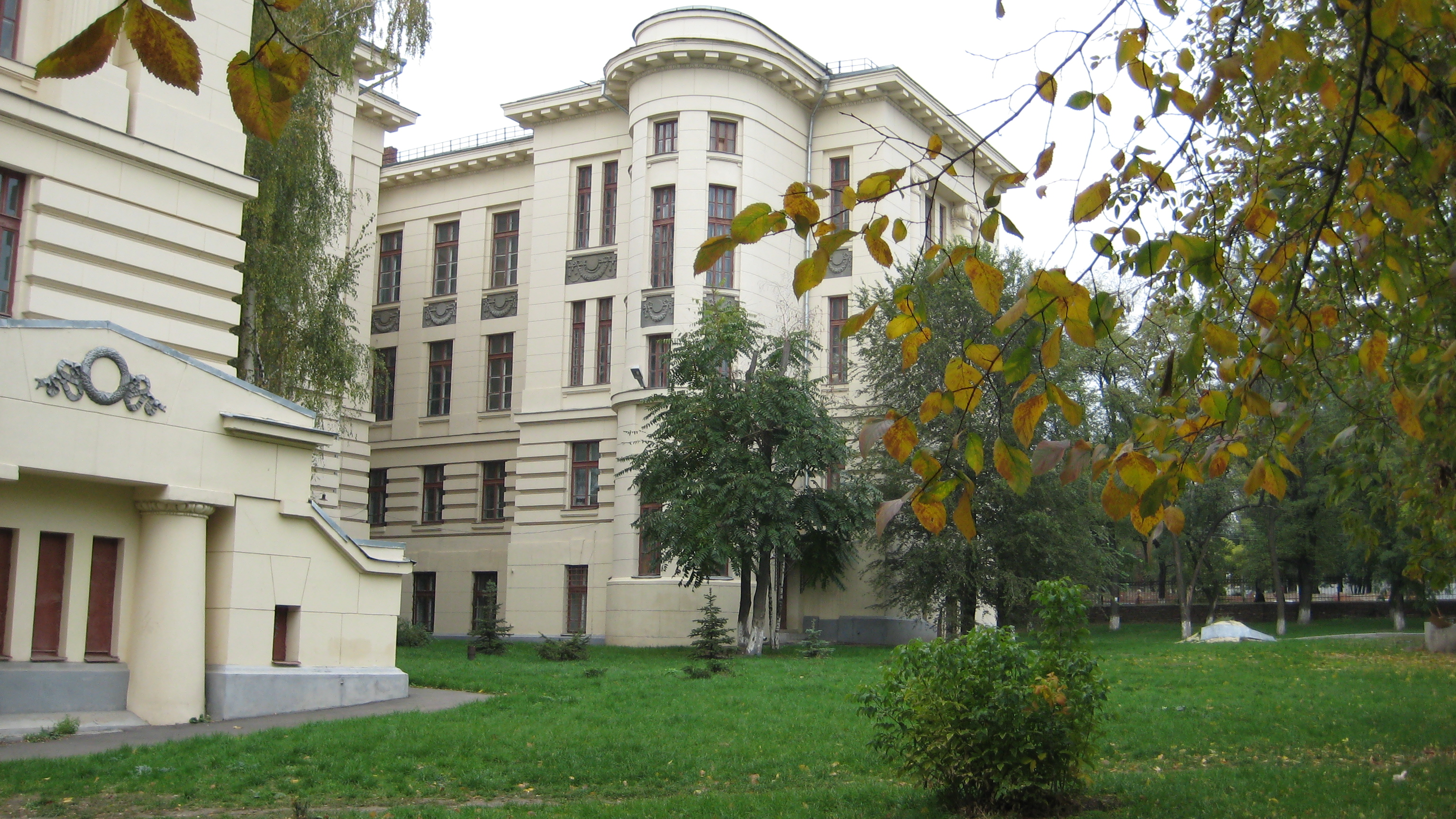
The Faculty of Geology and Oil and Gas Business is located in the House of Invalids.

The major faculties of the university includes:

- Faculty of Information Technology and Management
- Faculty of Geology, Mining and Oil and Gas Engineering
- Faculty of Mechanics
- Faculty of Civil Engineering
- Faculty of Technology
- Faculty of Energy
- Faculty of Innovation and Industrial Engineering
- Faculty of Transport and Logistics (existed from autumn 2018 to the end of winter 2020)
- Faculty of military training
- Faculty of Open and Distance Learning

== Memory ==
=== Commemorative plaques ===
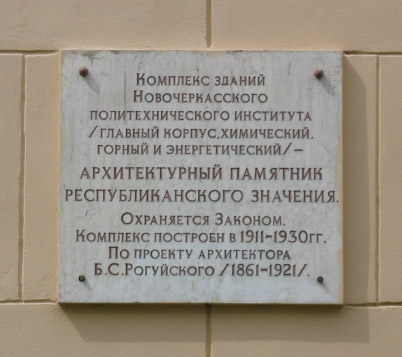
Commemorative plaque on the main building

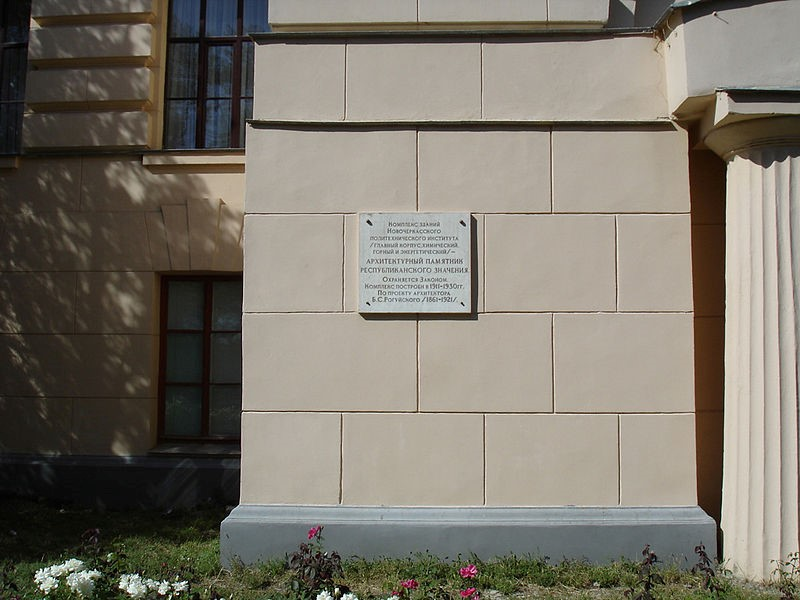
New main board location

Currently, SRSPU (NPI) has more than 28 memorial plaques on buildings and in subdivisions, including eight at its different departments.

=== Monuments ===
Within the territory of the university and its outside, there are monuments erected in honor of the notable graduates.

Monuments

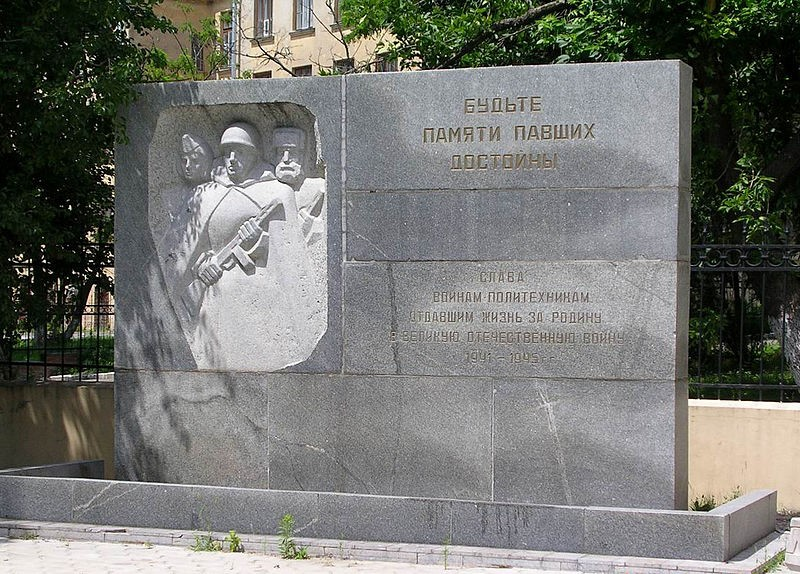
Monument to those killed in World War II

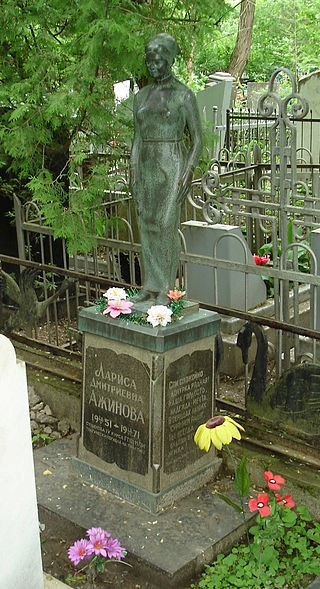
Monument to Azhinova L.D., student of GGF NPI, in the old cemetery of the city

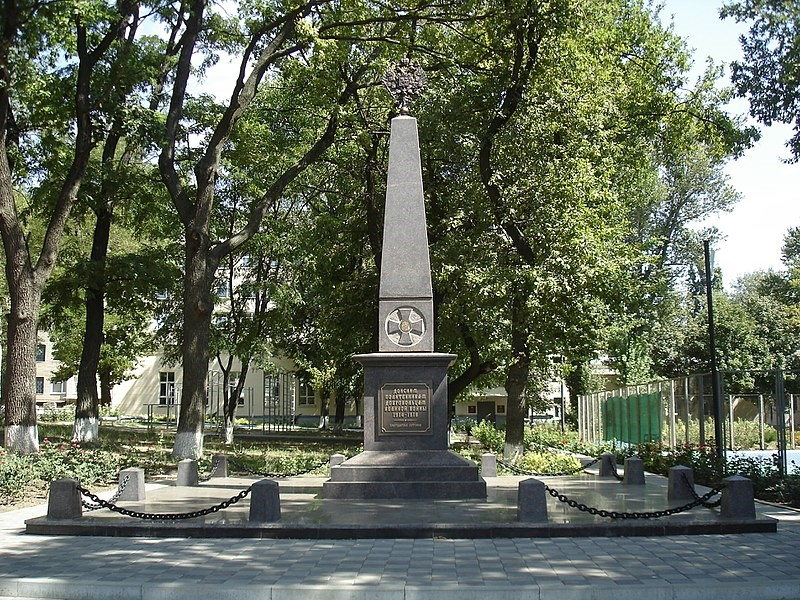
Monument to Polytechnics, volunteers of the Great War

== Notable people who studied and worked in DPI-NPI-YURGTU-YRSPU ==
During the Great Patriotic War, some of them fought and died at the front. A monument was erected in their honor. Near the right entrance there is a bust of Galina Petrova.

Among the graduates of the Novocherkassk Polytechnic University are:

- 19 laureates of the Lenin Prize
- 64 laureates of the USSR State Prize and State Prize of the Russian Federation
- 35 honored workers of science and technology:
  - Zubekhin, Alexey Pavlovich
- 28 Heroes of Socialist Labor:
  - twice Hero of Socialist Labor – Smirnov, Leonid Vasilievich
  - Mil, Mikhail Leontievich – MI helicopter designer
- Heroes of the Soviet Union and Russia:
  - Nikolay Dmitrievich Vovchenko
  - Ivan Ivanovich Klimenko
  - Georgy Ageevich Lobov
  - Petrova, Galina Konstantinovna
  - Simonov, Mikhail Petrovich
  - Vasily Ivanovikch Smolyanykh
  - Anton Stefanovich Shelaev

=== Portrait gallery ===
The gallery of portraits of university professors, created by artist Ivan Krylov is located on the second floor of the Main Building, on the outer wall of the assembly hall.

== Interesting facts ==
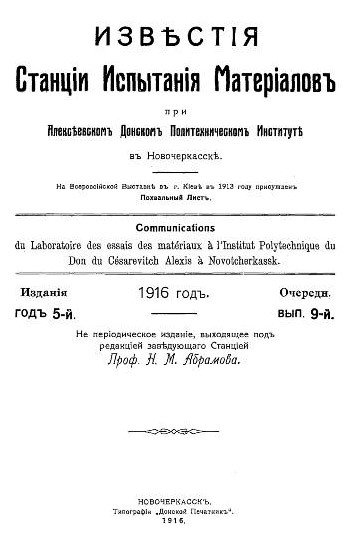
Materials Testing Station News, 1916

- In the Alekseevsk Don Polytechnic Institute, a non-periodical publication "News of the Testing Station of Materials" was published.
- In 1927, Anatolii Dorodnitsyn passed the entrance exams of the Novocherkassk Polytechnic University with honors but was not allowed to be admitted due to his "non-proletarian origin" (since father was a doctor and mother was a housewife). Anatoly had to get admitted to another educational institution for this reason.
- In September 1930, when the DPI was divided into several independent higher technical educational institutions, the Novocherkassk Aviation Institute (NAI) was created on the basis of its aviation faculty (opened in 1919). It was founded simultaneously with the aviation institutes in Moscow and Kharkov. Owing to the decision of the government in 1932, the Faculty of Aviation, Motor Building of the NAI was moved to Rybinsk, where the Rybinsk Aviation Institute (RAI) was established. In 1941 the RAI was further moved to the city of Ufa.
- During the occupation of Novocherkassk by German troops, the training of evacuated students and the work of NPI teachers continued at the Tomsk Polytechnic Institute.
- In the mid-'70s, the vocal-instrumental ensemble "Bliki" was invented by Alexander Shekhtman (now living in Israel) at the Faculty of Energy.

== See also ==
- Peter the Great St. Petersburg Polytechnic University
