= Ust-Donetsky District =

Ust-Donetsky District Усть-Донецкий район (Russian)
- District
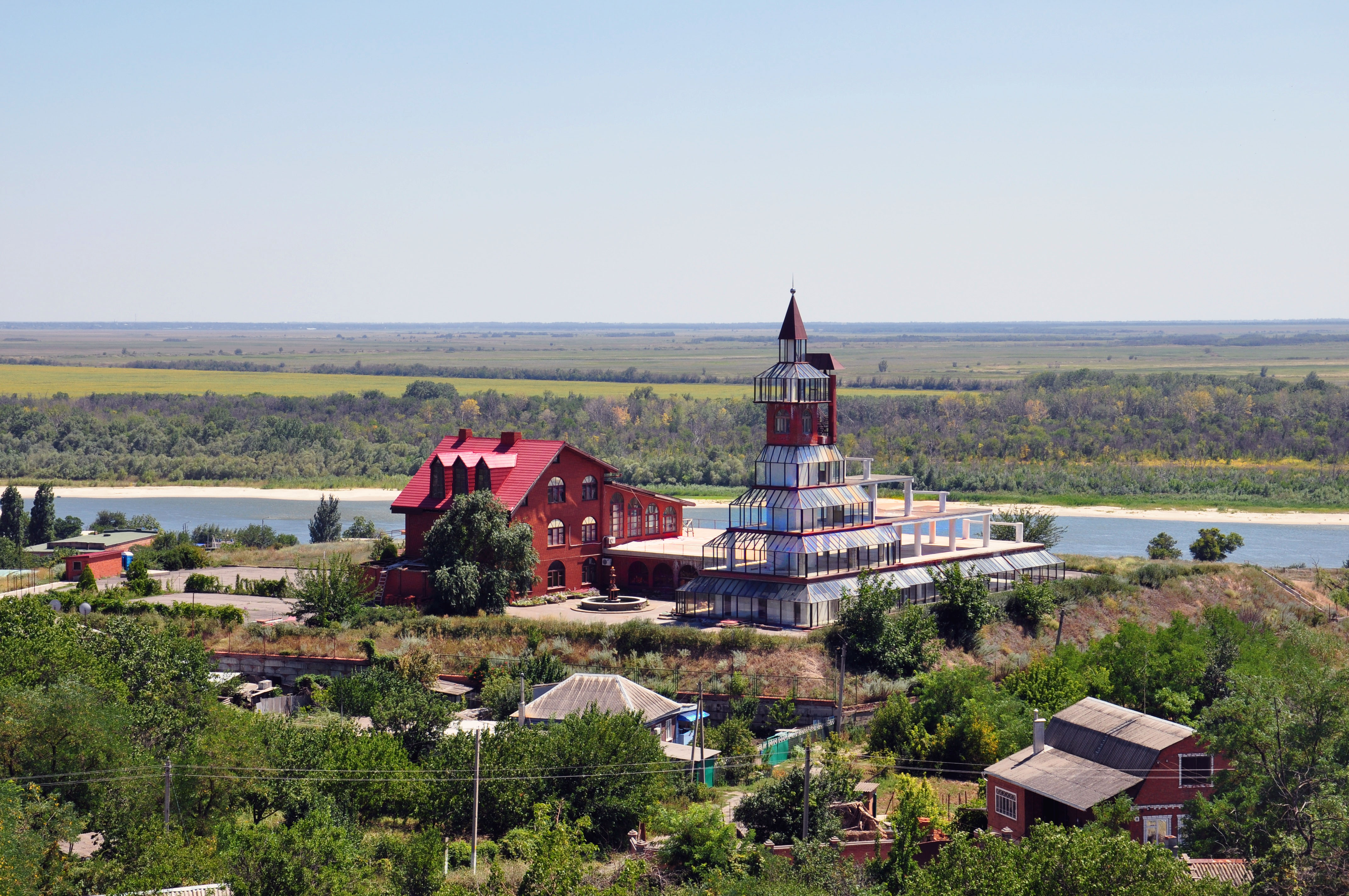
- Pukhlyakovsky in Ust-Donetsky District

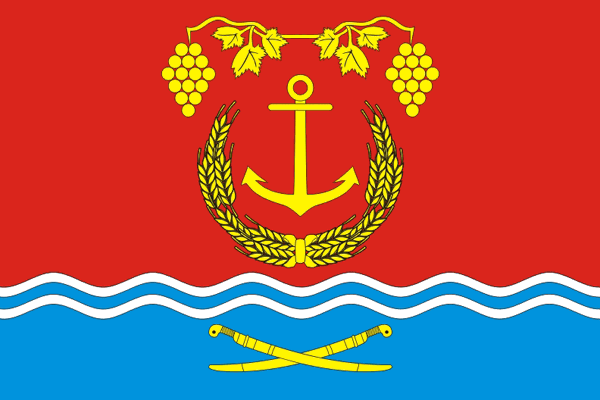
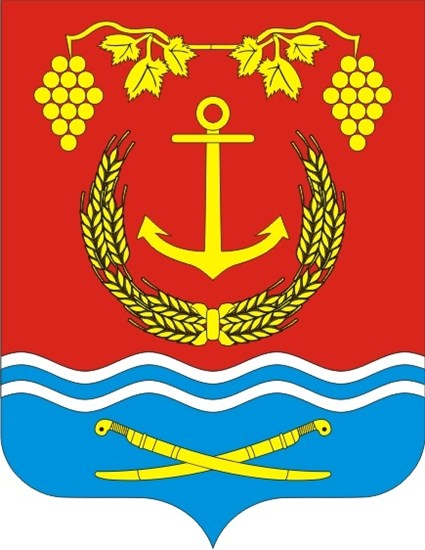
- Flag Coat of arms
- Location of Ust-Donetsky District in Rostov Oblast
- Coordinates: 47°38′23″N 40°51′59″E
- Country: Russia
- Federal subject: Rostov Oblast
- Established: 1935
- Administrative center: Ust-Donetsky

Area
  - Total: 1,150 km^{2} (440 sq mi)

Population (2010 Census)
  - Total: 33,647
  - Density: 29.3/km^{2} (75.8/sq mi)
  - Urban: 35.1%
  - Rural: 64.9%

Administrative structure
  - Administrative divisions: 1 Urban settlements, 7 Rural settlements
  - Inhabited localities: 1 urban-type settlements, 28 rural localities

Municipal structure
  - Municipally incorporated as: Ust-Donetsky Municipal District
  - Municipal divisions: 1 urban settlements, 7 rural settlements
- Time zone: UTC+3 (MSK)
- OKTMO ID: 60655000
- Website: http://ust.donland.ru/

Ust-Donetsky District (Russian: Усть-Доне́цкий райо́н) is an administrative and municipal district (raion), one of the forty-three in Rostov Oblast, Russia. It is located in the center of the oblast. The area of the district is 1,150 square kilometers (440 sq mi). Its administrative center is the urban locality (a work settlement) of Ust-Donetsky. Population: 33,647 (2010 Census); 32,479 (2002 census); 30,374 (1989 Soviet census). The population of the administrative center accounts for 35.1% of the district's total population.

== See also ==
- Church of the Nativity (Nizhnekundryuchenskaya)
