= Kotelnikovo =

Kotelnikovo (Russian: Котельниково) is the name of several inhabited localities in Russia.

Urban localities

- Kotelnikovo, Volgograd Oblast, a town in Kotelnikovsky District of Volgograd Oblast; administratively incorporated as a town of district significance
  - Kotelnikovo (air base), a Russian Air Force airbase located nearby

Rural localities

- Kotelnikovo, Arkhangelsk Oblast, a village in Votlazhemsky Selsoviet of Kotlassky District of Arkhangelsk Oblast
- Kotelnikovo, Nemansky District, Kaliningrad Oblast, a settlement under the administrative jurisdiction of the town of district significance of Neman, Nemansky District, Kaliningrad Oblast
- Kotelnikovo, Zelenogradsky District, Kaliningrad Oblast, a settlement in Pereslavsky Rural Okrug of Zelenogradsky District of Kaliningrad Oblast
- Kotelnikovo, Kostroma Oblast, a village in Kotelnikovskoye Settlement of Antropovsky District of Kostroma Oblast
- Kotelnikovo, Kursk Oblast, a selo in Kotelnikovsky Selsoviet of Oboyansky District of Kursk Oblast
- Kotelnikovo, Leningrad Oblast, a village in Pudostskoye Settlement Municipal Formation of Gatchinsky District of Leningrad Oblast
- Kotelnikovo, Novgorod Oblast, a village in Travkovskoye Settlement of Borovichsky District of Novgorod Oblast
- Kotelnikovo, Tver Oblast, a village in Kalininsky District of Tver Oblast
- Kotelnikovo, Spassky Selsoviet, Vologodsky District, Vologda Oblast, a village in Spassky Selsoviet of Vologodsky District of Vologda Oblast
- Kotelnikovo, Staroselsky Selsoviet, Vologodsky District, Vologda Oblast, a village in Staroselsky Selsoviet of Vologodsky District of Vologda Oblast
- Kotelnikovo, Zabaykalsky Krai, a selo in Nerchinsky District of Zabaykalsky Krai
