= Krasnoyarsky (rural locality) =

Krasnoyarsky (Russian: Красноя́рский; masculine), Krasnoyarskaya (Красноя́рская; feminine), or Krasnoyarskoye (Красноя́рское; neuter) is the name of several rural localities in Russia:

- Krasnoyarsky, Chelyabinsk Oblast, a settlement in Buranny Selsoviet of Agapovsky District of Chelyabinsk Oblast
- Krasnoyarsky, Orenburg Oblast, a settlement in Krasnoyarsky Settlement Council of Kvarkensky District of Orenburg Oblast
- Krasnoyarsky, Chernyshkovsky District, Volgograd Oblast, a settlement in Krasnoyarsky Selsoviet of Chernyshkovsky District of Volgograd Oblast
- Krasnoyarsky, Ilovlinsky District, Volgograd Oblast, a khutor in Kondrashevsky Selsoviet of Ilovlinsky District of Volgograd Oblast
- Krasnoyarsky, Kotelnikovsky District, Volgograd Oblast, a khutor in Krasnoyarsky Selsoviet of Kotelnikovsky District of Volgograd Oblast
- Krasnoyarsky, Serafimovichsky District, Volgograd Oblast, a khutor in Kletsko-Pochtovsky Selsoviet of Serafimovichsky District of Volgograd Oblast
- Krasnoyarsky, Voronezh Oblast, a khutor in Verkhnemamonskoye Rural Settlement of Verkhnemamonsky District of Voronezh Oblast
- Krasnoyarskoye, Altai Krai, a selo in Krasnoyarsky Selsoviet of Pospelikhinsky District of Altai Krai
- Krasnoyarskoye, Kaliningrad Oblast, a settlement in Krasnoyarsky Rural Okrug of Ozyorsky District of Kaliningrad Oblast
- Krasnoyarskoye, Kurgan Oblast, a village in Beloyarsky Selsoviet of Shchuchansky District of Kurgan Oblast
- Krasnoyarskoye, Sakhalin Oblast, a selo in Kholmsky District of Sakhalin Oblast
- Krasnoyarskoye, Stavropol Krai, a selo in Krasnoyarsky Selsoviet of Andropovsky District of Stavropol Krai
- Krasnoyarskaya, Rostov Oblast, a stanitsa in Krasnoyarskoye Rural Settlement of Tsimlyansky District of Rostov Oblast
- Krasnoyarskaya, Tyumen Oblast, a village in Bolshekrasnoyarsky Rural Okrug of Omutinsky District of Tyumen Oblast
