= Tsimlyansky =

Tsimlyansky (masculine), Tsimlyanskaya (feminine), or Tsimlyanskoye (neuter) may refer to:

- Tsimlyansky District, a district of Rostov Oblast, Russia
- Tsimlyanskoye Urban Settlement, an administrative division and a municipal formation which the town of Tsimlyansk in Tsimlyansky District of Rostov Oblast, Russia is incorporated as
- Tsimlyansky (rural locality), a rural locality (a settlement) in Shpakovsky District of Stavropol Krai, Russia
- Tsimlyanskaya, before 1950, name of Tsimlyansk, now a town in Rostov Oblast, Russia
- Tsimlyansk Reservoir (or Tsimlyanskoye Reservoir), an artificial lake on the Don River, Russia
