= Chiganaki =

Chiganaki Чиганаки
- Khutor
- Location within Volgograd Oblast Location within Russia
- Coordinates: 47°56′N 43°04′E
- Country: Russia
- Region: Volgograd Oblast
- District: Kotelnikovsky District
- Time zone: UTC+4:00

Chiganaki (Russian: Чиганаки) is a rural locality (a khutor) in Krasnoyarskoye Rural Settlement, Kotelnikovsky District, Volgograd Oblast, Russia. The population was 324 as of 2010. There are 7 streets.

== Geography ==
Chiganaki is located on the east bank of the Tsimlyansk Reservoir, 47 km north of Kotelnikovo (the district's administrative centre) by road. Krasnoyarsky is the nearest rural locality.
