= Nizhneyablochny =

Nizhneyablochny Нижнеяблочный
- Khutor
- Location within Volgograd Oblast Location within Russia
- Coordinates: 47°50′N 43°06′E
- Country: Russia
- Region: Volgograd Oblast
- District: Kotelnikovsky District
- Time zone: UTC+4:00

Nizhneyablochny (Russian: Нижнеяблочный) is a rural locality (a khutor) and the administrative center of Nizhneyablochnoye Rural Settlement, Kotelnikovsky District, Volgograd Oblast, Russia. The population was 1,174 as of 2010. There are 12 streets.

== Geography ==
Nizhneyablochny is located in steppe, on the bank of the Tsimlyansk Reservoir, 37 km north of Kotelnikovo (the district's administrative centre) by road. Krasnoyarsky is the nearest rural locality.
