= Generalovsky =

Generalovsky Генераловский
- Khutor
- Location within Volgograd Oblast Location within Russia
- Coordinates: 48°00′N 43°13′E
- Country: Russia
- Region: Volgograd Oblast
- District: Kotelnikovsky District
- Time zone: UTC+4:00

Generalovsky (Russian: Генераловский) is a rural locality (a khutor) and the administrative center of Generalovskoye Rural Settlement, Kotelnikovsky District, Volgograd Oblast, Russia. The population was 1,055 as of 2010. There are 23 streets.

== Geography ==
Generalovsky is located on the south bank of the Tsimlyansk Reservoir, 45 km north of Kotelnikovo (the district's administrative centre) by road. Novoaksaysky is the nearest rural locality.
