= Pokhlyobin =

Pokhlyobin Похлёбин
- Khutor
- Location within Volgograd Oblast Location within Russia
- Coordinates: 47°42′N 43°01′E
- Country: Russia
- Region: Volgograd Oblast
- District: Kotelnikovsky District
- Time zone: UTC+4:00

Pokhlyobin (Russian: Похлёбин) is a rural locality (a khutor) in Mayorovskoye Rural Settlement, Kotelnikovsky District, Volgograd Oblast, Russia. The population was 282 in 2010. There are ten streets.

== Geography ==
Pokhlyobin is located in steppe, on the bank of the Tsimlyansk Reservoir, 18 km northwest of Kotelnikovo (the district's administrative centre) by road. Safronov is the nearest rural locality.
