= Dorofeyevsky =

Dorofeyevsky Дорофеевский
- Khutor
- Location within Volgograd Oblast Location within Russia
- Coordinates: 47°59′N 43°19′E
- Country: Russia
- Region: Volgograd Oblast
- District: Kotelnikovsky District
- Time zone: UTC+4:00

Dorofeyevsky (Russian: Дорофеевский) is a rural locality (a khutor) in Generalovskoye Rural Settlement, Kotelnikovsky District, Volgograd Oblast, Russia. The population was 293 as of 2010. There are 12 streets.

== Geography ==
Dorofeyevsky is located on the left bank of the Aksay Yesaulovsky, 54 km north of Kotelnikovo (the district's administrative centre) by road. Novoaksaysky is the nearest rural locality.
