= Ravninny =

Ravninny Равнинный
- Settlement
- Location within Volgograd Oblast Location within Russia
- Coordinates: 47°50′N 43°28′E
- Country: Russia
- Region: Volgograd Oblast
- District: Kotelnikovsky District
- Time zone: UTC+4:00

Ravninny (Russian: Равнинный) is a rural locality (a settlement) and the administrative center of Chilekovskoye Rural Settlement, Kotelnikovsky District, Volgograd Oblast, Russia. The population was 906 as of 2010. There are 10 streets.

== Geography ==
Ravninny is located 40 km northeast of Kotelnikovo (the district's administrative centre) by road. Chilekovo is the nearest rural locality.
