= Kotelnikov, Volgograd Oblast =

Kotelnikov Котельников
- Khutor
- Location within Volgograd Oblast Location within Russia
- Coordinates: 47°38′N 43°11′E
- Country: Russia
- Region: Volgograd Oblast
- District: Kotelnikovsky District
- Time zone: UTC+4:00

Kotelnikov (Russian: Котельников) is a rural locality (a khutor) in Kotelnikovskoye Rural Settlement, Kotelnikovsky District, Volgograd Oblast, Russia. The population was 748 as of 2010. There are 16 streets.

== Geography ==
Kotelnikov is located on the banks of the Aksay Kurmoyarsky, 5 km east of Kotelnikovo (the district's administrative centre) by road. Kotelnikovo is the nearest rural locality.
