= Pospelikha =

Pospelikha (Russian: Поспелиха) is the name of several rural localities in Russia:

- Pospelikha, Altai Krai, a selo in Pospelikhinsky Selsoviet of Pospelikhinsky District of Altai Krai
- Pospelikha, Moscow Oblast, a village in Lyubuchanskoye Rural Settlement of Chekhovsky District of Moscow Oblast
- Pospelikha, Bogorodsky District, Nizhny Novgorod Oblast, a village in Khvoshchevsky Selsoviet of Bogorodsky District of Nizhny Novgorod Oblast
- Pospelikha, Varnavinsky District, Nizhny Novgorod Oblast, a village in Mikhaleninsky Selsoviet of Varnavinsky District of Nizhny Novgorod Oblast
