= Chilekovo =

Chilekovo Чилеково
- Settlement
- Location within Volgograd Oblast Location within Russia
- Coordinates: 47°50′N 43°29′E
- Country: Russia
- Region: Volgograd Oblast
- District: Kotelnikovsky District
- Time zone: UTC+4:00

Chilekovo (Russian: Чилеково) is a rural locality (a settlement) in Chilekovskoye Rural Settlement, Kotelnikovsky District, Volgograd Oblast, Russia. The population was 348 as of 2010. There are 11 streets.

== Geography ==
Chilekovo is located 39 km northeast of Kotelnikovo (the district's administrative centre) by road. Nebykov is the nearest rural locality.
