= Nagolny =

Nagolny Нагольный
- Khutor
- Location within Volgograd Oblast Location within Russia
- Coordinates: 47°34′N 43°09′E
- Country: Russia
- Region: Volgograd Oblast
- District: Kotelnikovsky District
- Time zone: UTC+4:00

Nagolny (Russian: Нагольный) is a rural locality (a khutor) and the administrative center of Nagolenskoye Rural Settlement, Kotelnikovsky District, Volgograd Oblast, Russia. The population was 1,065 as of 2010. There are 14 streets.

== Geography ==
Nagolny is located on the right bank of the Nagolnaya River, 7 km south of Kotelnikovo (the district's administrative centre) by road. Kotelnikovo is the nearest rural locality.
