= Semichny =

Semichny Семичный
- Khutor
- Location within Volgograd Oblast Location within Russia
- Coordinates: 47°37′N 43°02′E
- Country: Russia
- Region: Volgograd Oblast
- District: Kotelnikovsky District
- Time zone: UTC+4:00

Semichny (Russian: Семичный) is a rural locality (a khutor) and the administrative center of Semichenskoye Rural Settlement, Kotelnikovsky District, Volgograd Oblast, Russia. The population was 930 as of 2010. There are 12 streets.

== Geography ==
Semichny is located in steppe, 13 kilometres (8.1 mi) west of Kotelnikovo (the district's administrative centre) by road. Kotelnikovo is the nearest rural locality.
