= Nagavskaya =

Nagavskaya Нагавская
- Khutor
- Location within Volgograd Oblast Location within Russia
- Coordinates: 47°45′N 42°48′E
- Country: Russia
- Region: Volgograd Oblast
- District: Kotelnikovsky District
- Time zone: UTC+4:00

Nagavskaya (Russian: Нагавская) is a rural locality (a khutor) and the administrative center of Nagavskoye Rural Settlement, Kotelnikovsky District, Volgograd Oblast, Russia. The population was 730 as of 2010. There are 11 streets.

== Geography ==
Nagavskaya is located on the left bank of the Tsimlyansk Reservoir, 35 km northwest of Kotelnikovo (the district's administrative centre) by road. Mayorovsky is the nearest rural locality.
