= Pospelikhinsky =

Pospelikhinsky (masculine), Pospelikhinskaya (feminine), or Pospelikinskoye (neuter) may refer to:

- Pospelikhinsky District, a district of Altai Krai, Russia
- Pospelikhinsky (rural locality), a rural locality (a settlement) in Altai Krai, Russia
