= Poperechny =

Poperechny Поперечный
- Khutor
- Location within Volgograd Oblast Location within Russia
- Coordinates: 47°30′N 43°31′E
- Country: Russia
- Region: Volgograd Oblast
- District: Kotelnikovsky District
- Time zone: UTC+4:00

Poperechny (Russian: Поперечный) is a rural locality (a khutor) and the administrative center of Poperechenskoye Rural Settlement, Kotelnikovsky District, Volgograd Oblast, Russia. The population was 600 as of 2010. There are 14 streets.

== Geography ==
Poperechny is located 40 km southeast of Kotelnikovo (the district's administrative centre) by road. Rassvet is the nearest rural locality.
