= St. Nicholas' Church, Tsimlyansk =

Orthodox church in the town of Tsimlyansk, Rostov Oblast, Russia

Coordinates: 47.6428°N 42.0969°E

St. Nicholas' Church
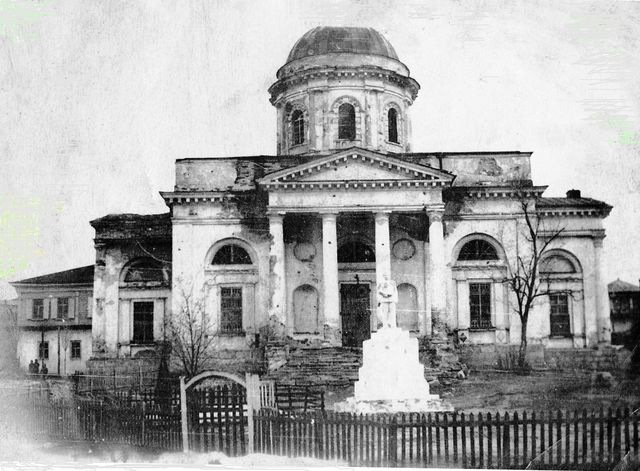

Religion
- Affiliation: Russian Orthodox

Location
- Location: Tsimlyansk, Russia
- Interactive map of St. Nicholas' Church

Architecture
- Completed: 2000

Saint Nicholas Church (Russian: Свято-Никольский храм) is an Orthodox church in the town of Tsimlyansk, Rostov Oblast, Russia. It is the church for the parish of Nicholas in Volgodonsk Diocese of the Russian Orthodox Church.

== History ==
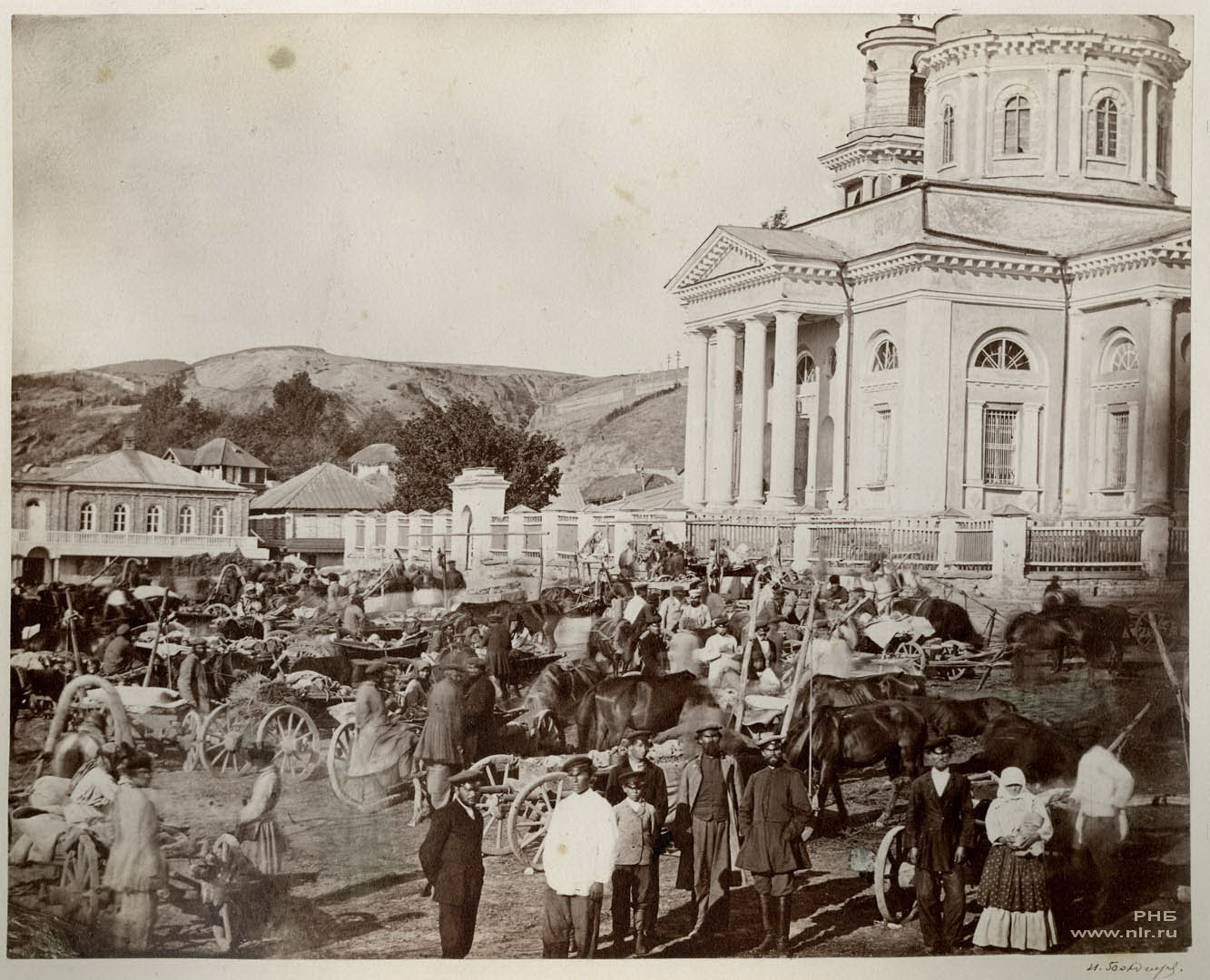
The predecessor of the modern church in the village of Tsimlyansk, 1875-1876 gg.

In 1715, a wooden church dedicated to Saint Nicholas was built in Tsimlyansk village. It was rebuilt in 1763. In 1839, on the site of the old church, a stone three-altar church was constructed, also dedicated to Saint Nicholas. After the flooding of Tsimlyansk Reservoir and the relocation of people from Tsimlyanskaya village to the modern town of Tsimlyansk, the church building was blown up.

In 1992, the religious community was granted a plot of land of 0.4 hectares in city center, at the intersection of Moskovskaya, Krupskaya and Mayakovskaya streets. In 1994, a memorial cross was erected on the site of the future church. On July 19, 1995, Metropolitan of Rostov and Novocherkassk, Vladimir (Kotlyarov), blessed the groundbreaking for St. Nicholas Church. Construction work began in earnest in 1996. By the beginning of 2000, the vaults of the structure had been erected, and construction of the roof began in September of the same year. The consecration of the church took place on 19 December 2000, the feast day of St. Nicholas.

In 2001–2005 on the territory of the parish were built clergy houses, also occupied by a Sunday school, and a water chapel dedicated to the members of Emperor Nicholas' family, who were canonized as passion bearers by the Moscow Patriarchate.
