= Primorsky, Kotelnikovsky District, Volgograd Oblast =

Primorsky Приморский
- Settlement
- Location within Volgograd Oblast Location within Russia
- Coordinates: 48°00′N 43°07′E
- Country: Russia
- Region: Volgograd Oblast
- District: Kotelnikovsky District
- Time zone: UTC+4:00

Primorsky (Russian: Приморский) is a rural locality (a settlement) in Pugachyovskoye Rural Settlement, Kotelnikovsky District, Volgograd Oblast, Russia. The population was 134 as of 2010. There are 5 streets.

== Geography ==
Primorsky is located in steppe, on the east bank of the Tsimlyansk Reservoir, 51 km north of Kotelnikovo (the district's administrative centre) by road. Pugachyovskaya is the nearest rural locality.
