= Pugachyovskaya, Volgograd Oblast =

Pugachyovskaya Пугачёвская
- Stanitsa
- Location within Volgograd Oblast Location within Russia
- Coordinates: 48°00′N 43°09′E
- Country: Russia
- Region: Volgograd Oblast
- District: Kotelnikovsky District
- Time zone: UTC+4:00

Pugachyovskaya (Russian: Пугачёвская) is a rural locality (a stanitsa) and the administrative center of Pugachyovskoye Rural Settlement, Kotelnikovsky District, Volgograd Oblast, Russia. The population was 654 as of 2010. There are 12 streets.

It is named after Yemelyan Pugachev, an ataman of the Yaik Cossacks who was born in this village. He is famous for having led a great popular insurrection during the reign of Catherine the Great. The original name "Zimoveyskaya" was changed after his defeat to Potemkinskaya. In 1917, following the October Revolution, it was renamed in his honor.

== Geography ==
Pugachyovskaya is located on the east bank of the Tsimlyansk Reservoir, 50 km north of Kotelnikovo (the district's administrative centre) by road. Primorsky is the nearest rural locality.
