= Krasnoyarsky =

Krasnoyarsky (masculine), Krasnoyarskaya (feminine), or Krasnoyarskoye (neuter) may refer to:

- Krasnoyarsk Krai (Krasnoyarsky krai), a federal subject of Russia
- Krasnoyarsky District, name of several districts in Russia
- Krasnoyarsky (rural locality) (Krasnoyarskaya, Krasnoyarskoye), several rural localities in Russia

== See also ==
- Krasnoyarsk (disambiguation)
- Krasny Yar (disambiguation)
