= Stepnobugrinsky =

Stepnobugrinsky Степнобугринский
- Settlement
- Location within Altai Krai Location within Russia
- Coordinates: 51°34′N 81°46′E
- Country: Russia
- Region: Altai Krai
- District: Pospelikhinsky District
- Time zone: UTC+7:00

Stepnobugrinsky (Russian: Степнобугринский) is a rural locality (a settlement) in 12 let Oktyabrya Selsoviet of Pospelikhinsky District, Altai Krai, Russia. The population was 20 in 2017. There are 3 streets.

== Geography ==
Stepnobugrinsky is located 60 km south of Pospelikha (the district's administrative centre) by road. Cheburikha is the nearest rural locality.
