= Karayichev =

Karayichev Караичев
- Khutor
- Location within Volgograd Oblast Location within Russia
- Coordinates: 47°38′N 43°19′E
- Country: Russia
- Region: Volgograd Oblast
- District: Kotelnikovsky District
- Time zone: UTC+4:00

Karayichev (Russian: Караичев) is a rural locality (a khutor) in Kotelnikovskoye Rural Settlement, Kotelnikovsky District, Volgograd Oblast, Russia. The population was 253 as of 2010. There are 7 streets.

== Geography ==
Karayichev is located on the bank of the Aksay Kurmoyarsky, 15 km east of Kotelnikovo (the district's administrative centre) by road. Lenina is the nearest rural locality.
