= Posyolok imeni Mamontova =

Posyolok imeni Mamontova Посёлок имени Мамонтова
- Settlement
- Location within Altai Krai Location within Russia
- Coordinates: 53°05′N 82°48′E
- Country: Russia
- Region: Altai Krai
- District: Pospelikhinsky District
- Time zone: UTC+7:00

Posyolok imeni Mamontova (Russian: Посёлок имени Мамонтова) is a rural locality (a settlement) in Mamontovsky Selsoviet, Pospelikhinsky District, Altai Krai, Russia. The population was 1,435 in 2014. There are 4 streets.

== Geography ==
Posyolok imeni Mamontova is located 10 km southwest of Pospelikha (the district's administrative centre) by road. Krutoy Yar is the nearest rural locality.
