= Pimeno-Cherni =

Pimeno-Cherni Пимено-Черни
- Khutor
- Location within Volgograd Oblast Location within Russia
- Coordinates: 47°41′N 43°28′E
- Country: Russia
- Region: Volgograd Oblast
- District: Kotelnikovsky District
- Time zone: UTC+4:00

Pimeno-Cherni (Russian: Пимено-Черни) is a rural locality (a khutor) and the administrative center of Pimeno-Chernyanskoye Rural Settlement, Kotelnikovsky District, Volgograd Oblast, Russia. The population was 1,088 as of 2010. There are 27 streets.

== Geography ==
Pimeno-Cherni is located on the right bank of the Aksay Kurmoyarsky River, 32 km northeast of Kotelnikovo (the district's administrative centre) by road. Nizhniye Cherni is the nearest rural locality.
