= Mayorovsky, Kotelnikovsky District, Volgograd Oblast =

Mayorovsky Майоровский
- Khutor
- Location within Volgograd Oblast Location within Russia
- Coordinates: 47°40′N 42°58′E
- Country: Russia
- Region: Volgograd Oblast
- District: Kotelnikovsky District
- Time zone: UTC+4:00

Mayorovsky (Russian: Майоровский) is a rural locality (a khutor) and the administrative center of Mayorovskoye Rural Settlement, Kotelnikovsky District, Volgograd Oblast, Russia. The population was 559 as of 2010. There are 22 streets.

== Geography ==
Mayorovsky is located in steppe, 15 km southeast of Kotelnikovo (the district's administrative centre) by road. Kotelnikovo is the nearest rural locality.
