= Kotelnikovsky =

Kotelnikovsky (masculine), Kotelnikovskaya (feminine), or Kotelnikovskoye (neuter) may refer to:

- Kotelnikovsky District, a district of Volgograd Oblast, Russia
- Kotelnikovskoye Urban Settlement, a municipal formation which the town of district significance of Kotelnikovo in Kotelnikovsky District of Volgograd Oblast, Russia is incorporated as
