= Vypasnoy =

Vypasnoy Выпасной
- Settlement
- Location within Volgograd Oblast Location within Russia
- Coordinates: 47°36′N 43°34′E
- Country: Russia
- Region: Volgograd Oblast
- District: Kotelnikovsky District
- Time zone: UTC+4:00

Vypasnoy (Russian: Выпасной) is a rural locality (a settlement) and the administrative center of Vypasnovskoye Rural Settlement, Kotelnikovsky District, Volgograd Oblast, Russia. The population was 864 as of 2010. There are 13 streets.

== Geography ==
Vypasnoy is located 37 km east of Kotelnikovo (the district's administrative centre) by road. Poperechny is the nearest rural locality.
