= Khodayevsky =

Khodayevsky Ходаевский
- Settlement
- Location within Altai Krai Location within Russia
- Coordinates: 51°38′N 81°45′E
- Country: Russia
- Region: Altai Krai
- District: Pospelikhinsky District
- Time zone: UTC+7:00

Khodayevsky (Russian: Ходаевский) is a rural locality (a settlement) in 12 let Oktyabrya Selsoviet of Pospelikhinsky District, Altai Krai, Russia. The population was 3 in 2014.

== Geography ==
Khodayevsky is located 50 km south of Pospelikha (the district's administrative centre) by road. Blagodatny is the nearest rural locality.
