= Kalmytskiye Mysy =

Kalmytskiye Mysy Калмыцкие Мысы
- Village
- Location within Altai Krai Location within Russia
- Coordinates: 51°53′N 82°16′E
- Country: Russia
- Region: Altai Krai
- District: Pospelikhinsky District
- Time zone: UTC+7:00

Kalmytskiye Mysy (Russian: Калмыцкие Мысы) is a rural locality (a selo) and the administrative center of Kalmytsko-Mysovskoy Selsoviet, Pospelikhinsky District, Altai Krai, Russia. The population was 1,151 in 2016. There are 12 streets.

== Geography ==
Kalmytskiye Mysy is located on the Loktevka River, 37 km southeast of Pospelikha (the district's administrative centre) by road. Ilyinka is the nearest rural locality.
