= Krasnoyarsky, Kotelnikovsky District, Volgograd Oblast =

Krasnoyarsky Красноярский
- Khutor
- Location within Volgograd Oblast Location within Russia
- Coordinates: 47°53′N 43°03′E
- Country: Russia
- Region: Volgograd Oblast
- District: Kotelnikovsky District
- Time zone: UTC+4:00

Krasnoyarsky (Russian: Красноярский) is a rural locality (a khutor) and the administrative center of Krasnoyarskoye Rural Settlement, Kotelnikovsky District, Volgograd Oblast, Russia. The population was 1,501 as of 2010. There are 26 streets.

== Geography ==
Krasnoyarsky is located on the left bank of the Tsimlyansk Reservoir, 44 km north of Kotelnikovo (the district's administrative centre) by road. Chiganaki is the nearest rural locality.
