= Krasnoyarsk (inhabited locality) =

Krasnoyarsk (Russian: Красноярск) is the name of several inhabited localities in Russia.

== Modern localities ==
Urban localities

- Krasnoyarsk, a city and the administrative center of Krasnoyarsk Krai

Rural localities

- Krasnoyarsk, Orenburg Oblast, a selo in Anikhovsky Selsoviet of Adamovsky District in Orenburg Oblast

== Alternative names ==
- Krasnoyarsk, alternative name of Krasnoyarskoye, a selo in Krasnoyarsky Selsoviet of Pospelikhinsky District in Altai Krai; 51°45′N 81°36′E

== See also ==
- Krasnoyarsky (rural locality), several rural localities in Russia
