= Vasily Generalov =

- Born: March 8, 1867; Potyomkinskaya, Don Host Oblast, Russian Empire
- Died: May 8, 1887 (aged 20); Shlisselburg Fortress, Russia
- Cause of death: Execution by hanging

Vasily Denisovich Generalov (8 March 1867, Potyomkinskaya, Don Host Oblast - 8 May 1887) was a Russian revolutionary and a member of Narodnaya Volya.

In 1886, Generalov enrolled in St. Petersburg University and later became a member of the "Terrorist Faction" of Narodnaya Volya. He took active part in preparing the assassination of Alexander III. On March 1, 1887, Generalov was arrested at Nevsky Prospekt, where he was supposed to murder the tsar.

Generalov was tried and sentenced to death by hanging by the Special Presence of the Ruling Senate. He was executed in the Shlisselburg Fortress.
