= HPZ =

HPZ may refer to:

- Hrvatski plemićki zbor, Croatian for the Croatian Nobility Association
- HPZ, abbreviation for special education center in Liechtenstein attended by Josy Biedermann
- HPZ, Croatian language abbreviation for Croatian Orthodox Union, organization founded by archbishop of Association of Croatian Orthodox Believers
- High pressure zone, term used in study of obstructed defecation
