= Association of Croatian Orthodox Believers =

- Sign of the Association of Croatian Orthodox Believers
- Abbreviation: UHPV
- Formation: 10 September 2010
- Type: NGO
- Purpose: Re-establishment of the Croatian Orthodox Church
- Headquarters: Žrtava ratova 21, Murter, Croatia
- Location: Murter, Croatia
- Coordinates: 43°48′N 15°36′E
- Members: Around 1,000
- Official language: Croatian
- President: Predrag Mišić

The Association of Croatian Orthodox Believers (Croatian: Udruga hrvatskih pravoslavnih vjernika), often called Croatian Orthodox Union (Croatian: Hrvatska pravoslavna zajednica) is a civic association in Croatia that formed for the reestablishment of the Croatian Orthodox Church, an unrecognized Eastern Orthodox church that existed from 1942 to 1945, created by the Ustaše in the Independent State of Croatia. Their logo was inspired by the COC.

== History ==
The association publishes a journal called Hrvatski pravoslavac (English: The Croatian Orthodox) which features articles discussing religious, historical and political events in Croatia and Bosnia and Herzegovina. One of their main activities is the encouragement of Orthodox population in Croatia to officially declare themselves as Croats. The association marks anniversaries of death of Patriarch Germogen of Croatia and other Croatian Orthodox priests killed by the Yugoslav Partisans in 1945.

Croatian law stipulates that at least 500 members and 5 years of existence are required for a religious organization to be officially registered. According to the 2001 census Croatia had around 200,000 Orthodox believers, the majority of whom are thought to be members of the Serbian Orthodox Church, e.g. ethnic Serbs. The association's main goal is gathering Orthodox believers of Croat ethnicity so that forming a separate Croatian Orthodox Church would become possible.

There were 11,400 Croatian citizens who identified themselves as ethnic Croats of the Orthodox Christian persuasion in the 2001 census, but since they did not identify themselves as members of the Croatian Orthodox Church the foundation of the new organisation is still not possible. Those 11,400 Croats are not members of any Orthodox Church currently in existence, so if they identified themselves as Croatian Orthodox in the 2011 census the Croatian Orthodox Church could be re-established.

When it was founded, Ivo Matanović was its leader. In 2012, the Croatian Orthodox Union declared their support for Aleksandar Radoev Ivanov. He was elected archbishop of a new Croatian Orthodox Church on 3 October 2013. Andrija Škulić also declared himself archbishop. Eventually, all three had a fall out and parted ways UHPV had been liquidated for the lack of meetings. In 2017, Ivanov founded the Croatian Orthodox Union (HPZ). In 2023, the association was bankrupt.

A few Croatian right-wing political parties have expressed support for the association and its goals, including the Croatian Party of Rights, the Croatian Pure Party of Rights and the Homeland Movement. However, members of the Serbian Orthodox Church, Independent Democratic Serb Party, Serb People's Party, Serb National Council, Croatian culture minister Božo Biškupić, and President Ivo Josipović have all voiced criticism of the association, with the latter two describing it as intolerant and its existence a continuation of the Ustaše legacy.
