= Patriarch Germogen =

Patriarch Germogen may refer to:

- Patriarch Hermogenes of Moscow (1530–1612), Patriarch of all Russia
- Germogen Maximov (1861–1945), Patriarch of Croatian Orthodox Church
