= Pospelikhinsky (rural locality) =

Rural locality in Pospelikhinsky District, Russia

Coordinates: 51°52′N 81°51′E

Pospelikhinsky (Russian: Поспелихинский) is a rural locality (a settlement) in Pospelikhinsky District of Altai Krai, Russia.
