= Krasnoyarsky District =

Location of Astrakhan Oblast in Russia

Location of Samara Oblast in Russia

Krasnoyarsky District is the name of several administrative and municipal districts in Russia:

- Krasnoyarsky District, Astrakhan Oblast, an administrative and municipal district of Astrakhan Oblast
- Krasnoyarsky District, Samara Oblast, an administrative and municipal district of Samara Oblast

== See also ==
- Krasnoyarsky (disambiguation)
- Krasnoyarsk Krai, a federal subject of Russia
