= Tsimlyansk hydroelectric power station =

Hydroelectric power station in Russia

Tsimlyanskaya HPP
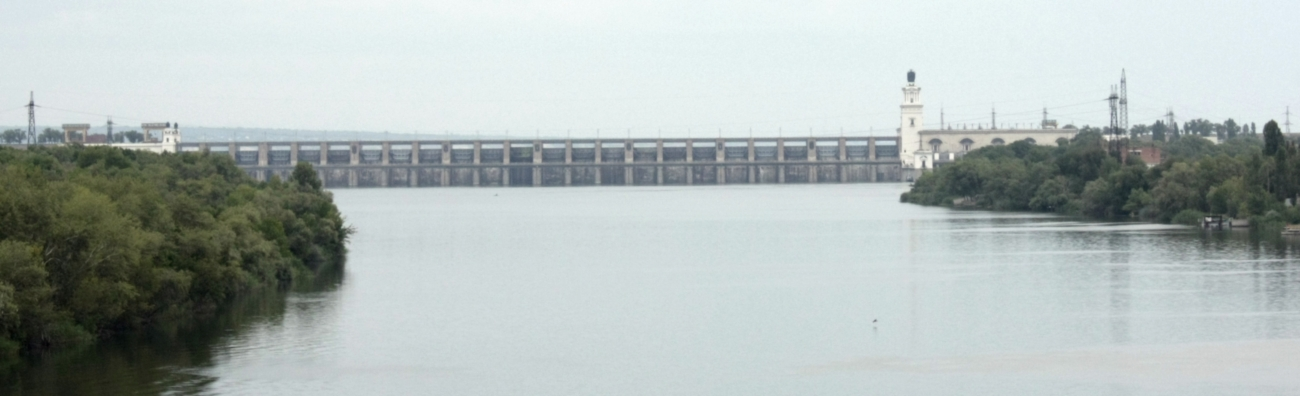

- Location within Rostov Oblast
- Country: Russia
- Location: Rostov Oblast
- Coordinates: 47°36′22″N 42°06′44″E
- Status: operating
- Construction began: 1949
- Owner: Lukoil-Ecoenergo

Power generation
- Nameplate capacity: 211.5 MW

External links
- Commons: Related media on Commons

Tsimlyanskaya Hydroelectric Power Plant (Russian: Цимля́нская ГЭС) is a hydroelectric power station on the Don River in Rostov Oblast, near the cities of Volgodonsk and Tsimlyansk. It was built in 1949–1954 as part of the program to construct the Volga–Don Shipping Canal, mainly using the labor of Gulag prisoners, and is one of the "Great Construction Projects of Communism". It has significant economic importance, providing large-tonnage navigation on the lower Don, operation of the Volga–Don Canal, irrigation of large areas of arid lands, water supply, flood protection, and electricity generation. The owner of the HPP facilities (except for the navigation locks) is LLC "Lukoil-Ekoenergo".

== Natural conditions ==
The Tsimlyanskaya HPP is located on the Don River 309 km from its mouth and is the only hydroelectric power station on this river. The catchment area of the river at the dam axis of the HPP is 255,000 km^{2} (about 60% of the river's total drainage basin area). The climate in the area of the HPP location is continental, and the reservoir is located in the dry steppe and semidesert zones with their characteristic droughts and sukhoveys. The average annual precipitation is 350–400 mm, while evaporation from the reservoir surface is about 1,000 mm. The Don's water regime is characterized by a clearly expressed spring flood during which an average of 72% of the annual runoff passes. The average annual water flow in the river at the Tsimlyanskaya HPP axis is 655 m^{3}/s, and the average annual runoff is 20.66 km^{3}. The maximum water flow with a recurrence interval of once every 10,000 years is estimated at 21,532 m^{3}/s, and the maximum recorded flow over the entire observation period was 14,436 m^{3}/s. Below the Tsimlyanskaya HPP on the Don are the Nikolaevsky, Konstantinovsky, and Kochetovsky hydro nodes, which do not include hydroelectric power stations. Their main task is to maintain navigable depths. The Don River at the Tsimlyanskaya HPP axis has an elevated right bank and a lowland left bank. The HPP building and spillway dam are built in the floodplain on the left bank (with the dam partially located within the former Susorovo Lake), which allowed solving the problem of passing the river's runoff during construction naturally, as well as reducing the volume of work on temporary cofferdams. The earthen dams from the left bank are mostly located on floodplain terraces, and the right-bank dam is on the floodplain. The foundations of the HPP structures located within the floodplain and riverbed consist of fine-grained alluvial sands underlain at a depth of 25–30 m by a layer of clay marls. The floodplain terraces are composed of loess-like loams.

== Construction ==
The Tsimlyanskaya HPP is a low-head run-of-river hydroelectric power station (the HPP building is part of the head front). The hydroelectric power station structures are of Class I capital class and include three earthen dams, a concrete spillway dam, the HPP building with a fish ladder, navigation locks, the headworks of the Don Main Canal, a 110/220 kV switchyard; the total length of the backwater structures of the hydro node is 13,460 m. An automobile and railway pass over the HPP structures. The installed capacity of the power station is 211.5 MW, the designed average annual electricity generation is 659.5 million kWh, and the actual average annual generation for the period 1980–2010 was 613 million kWh.

=== Earthen dams ===
The majority of the head front of the Tsimlyanskaya HPP is formed by three earthen dams—left-bank Nos. 90 and 91 and right-bank No. 92, into which a total of 31.614 million m^{3} of soil was placed. The left-bank dam No. 90 is located between the left floodplain bank of the Don and the navigation locks, with the headworks of the Don Main Canal embedded in the dam body. The dam length is 2,740.73 m, crest width is 20 m, maximum base width is 115 m, maximum height is 11.8 m. The dam is built from loess-like loams, the upstream slope is secured with reinforced concrete slabs on a sand layer, and the downstream slope with gravel and crushed stone fill. There are no anti-seepage devices in the dam body and foundation; drainage devices include a toe drain consisting of a 1 m thick sand layer on the downstream slope, a strip collection drain of riprap with transverse sand drains in the dam foundation, and a drainage ditch. The left-bank dam No. 91 is located between the navigation lock and the HPP building. The dam length is 6,760.21 m, crest width is 20 m, maximum base width is 327.5 m, maximum height is 25 m. The dam is hydraulically filled with fine-grained sand, the upstream slope is secured with reinforced concrete slabs, and the downstream slope with gravel fill. There are no anti-seepage devices in the dam body and foundation (except for the section adjoining the HPP building, where two diaphragms of steel sheet piling are installed). Drainage devices include a horizontal closed pipe drain in the lower part of the downstream prism of the dam (concrete pipe with diameter 0.8–1.6 m), a drainage ditch along the downstream slope, and vertical drainage (relief wells). The right-bank dam No. 92 is located between the spillway dam and the right floodplain bank of the Don. The dam length is 3,171.04 m, crest width is 20 m, maximum base width is 345.55 m, maximum height is 35 m. The dam is hydraulically filled with fine- and mixed-grained sands, the upstream slope is secured with reinforced concrete slabs, the downstream slope with gravel fill; the reservoir bank adjoining the dam is also secured with 80 m of reinforced concrete slabs. There are no anti-seepage devices in the dam body and foundation, and drainage devices include a horizontal closed pipe drain in the lower part of the downstream prism of the dam (concrete pipe with diameter 0.8 m), a drainage ditch along the downstream slope, and vertical drainage (relief wells).

=== Spillway dam ===
External image
- Spillway dam and Tsimlyanskaya HPP building

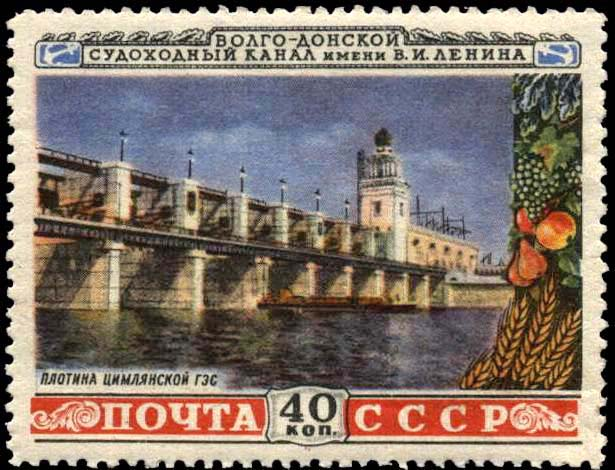
Spillway dam, postage stamp of the USSR, 1953

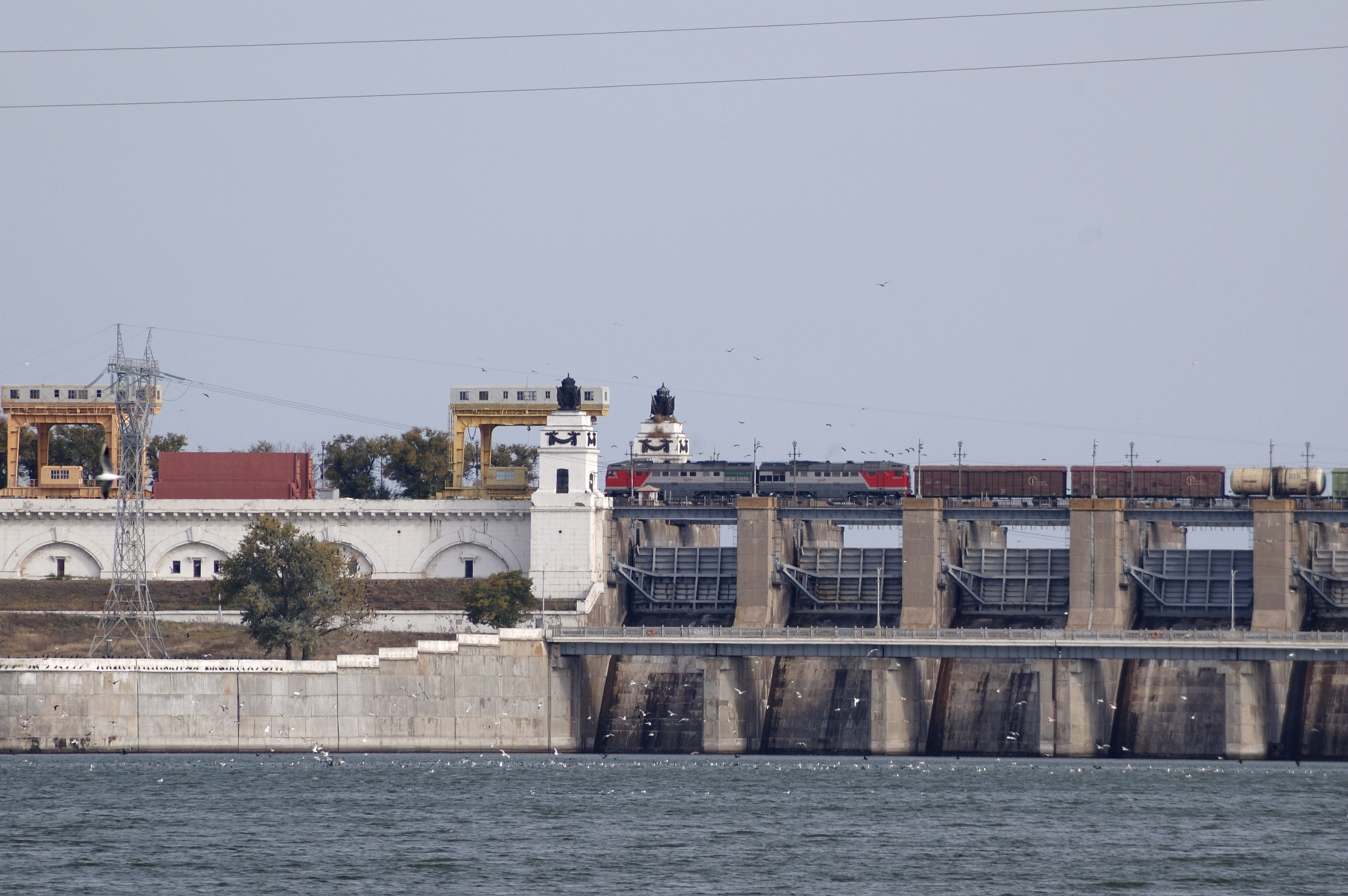
Tsimlyanskaya HPP, fragment

The spillway dam, located between the right-bank earthen dam and the HPP building, is intended for passing water during strong floods or when the hydro units are stopped. By design, the spillway dam is a gravity concrete dam with a heavily protruding upstream foundation slab. The dam length is 495.5 m, crest width is 12.5 m, maximum base width is 60.5 m, maximum height is 43.65 m, and 888,000 m^{3} of concrete was placed in the dam. The dam has 24 spillway openings 16 m wide each, closed by main segmental gates and flat emergency-repair gates; gate operation is performed using two gantry overhead cranes with a lifting capacity of 75 t each. The dam is designed to pass 16,200 m^{3}/s of water at normal backwater level and 23,300 m^{3}/s at forced level. The energy of the discharged water is dissipated on a stilling basin 50 m long and 4.5 m thick, on which chutes, stream-deflecting piers, and a stilling wall are located. Behind the stilling basin is a riprap 280.7 m long, made of concrete slabs 1.25–2.5 m thick. The initial section of the riprap is horizontal, then gradually slopes down and ends with an embedded chute. The body of the spillway dam consists of a 60.5 m long foundation slab and piers heavily developed toward the upstream side. A gallery is constructed in the dam body, also serving to drain seepage water through the dam. In addition to the gallery, the dam's anti-seepage devices include a 50 m long apron, three rows of steel sheet piling in the foundation, a double sheet pile diaphragm at the junction with the right-bank dam, drainage wells under the stilling basin and riprap, as well as two rows of drainage wells at the end of the riprap. On the upstream side, steel spans of a railway bridge are laid on the dam piers, and on the downstream side, a road bridge.

=== HPP building ===
External images
- Machine hall of Tsimlyanskaya HPP
- Fish ladder of Tsimlyanskaya HPP

The HPP building is of run-of-river type (perceives water head); it is combined with the fish ladder. The building length is 116.6 m, width 56.5 m, height 48.7 m. Structurally, the HPP building is made of monolithic reinforced concrete, divided into four unit blocks, a fish ladder block, and an assembly platform. Two galleries are constructed in the foundation slab of the HPP building (56.5 m long). Below the building is a stilling basin 0.3–1 m thick and 50 m long, followed by a riprap 60 m long made of reinforced concrete slabs. Protection of the HPP building from seepage is provided by an apron consisting of a 40 m long reinforced concrete slab covered with two layers of bitumen mats overlain by a 1.5 m thick loam layer, as well as three rows of steel sheet piling. The machine hall of the HPP building houses four vertical hydro units with Kaplan turbines: three with a capacity of 52.5 MW each and one with 50 MW. The 52.5 MW units are equipped with PL-30/877-V-660 turbines (two units; manufactured by Leningrad Metal Works (LMZ)) and PL 495-VB-660 (one unit; manufactured by Andritz), operating at a designed head of 22 m. The turbines drive hydro generators SV 1040/120-68 manufactured by the "Electrosila" and "Elsib" plants. The 50 MW unit is equipped with a PL 495-VB-660 turbine (operating at a designed head of 17.5 m) and an SV 1030/120-68 generator; the equipment was manufactured by LMZ and "Electrosila". Assembly and disassembly of the hydro units is ensured by two bridge cranes with a lifting capacity of 150 t each located in the machine hall. On the upstream side, the turbine water intake openings are equipped with trash racks, flat wheeled emergency-repair gates, and flat repair gates. Operation of the emergency-repair gates is performed using winches, and of the repair gates and trash racks using a gantry crane. The turbine draft tubes are closed by flat repair gates.

Hydro units of Tsimlyanskaya HPP
Unit number	1	2	3	4	5
Unit capacity, MW	50	52.5	52.5	52.5	4
Commissioning year	1952	2001	1999	2012	1953
Turbine type	PL 495-VB-660	PL-30/877-V-660	PL-30/877-V-660	PL 495-VB-660	PL 495-VB-225
Turbine manufacturer	LMZ	LMZ	LMZ	Andritz Hydro	Uralgidromash
Generator type	SV 1030/120-68	SV 1040/120-68	SV 1040/120-68	SV 1040/120-68	VGS-325/64-24
Generator manufacturer	Electrosila	Electrosila	Electrosila	Elsib	Electrosila

The fish ladder, intended for passing spawning sturgeon and cyprinid fish, is located between the spillway dam and the HPP building. The fish ladder includes an entrance flume, trap, fish lift lock, exit flume, and small hydro unit. The 110 m long and 6 m wide entrance flume is located in the downstream, forming a separate pier between the spillway dam and the HPP building. Fish attraction to the flume is achieved using the water flow created by the small hydro unit, whose draft tube exit opening is located at the bottom of the flume. The hydro unit has a capacity of 4 MW and consists of a vertical Kaplan turbine PL 495-VB-225 manufactured by the "Uralgidromash" plant and a VGS-325/64-24 generator manufactured by the "Electrosila" plant. Fish passing through the flume accumulate in a 5×18 m trap, from where they are directed to the fish lift lock using moving nets. The lock is 5×7 m in size, filled with water from the upstream, and equipped with a lifting net that encourages fish to move upward. After lockage, the fish are transferred to the reservoir via a 65 m long and 6 m wide exit flume. The lockage process is fully automated and takes about 40 minutes. The fish ladder is equipped with a system of flat gates closing various sections during normal operation and maintenance. Electricity is generated by the HPP generators at 10.5 kV, which is stepped up to 110 and 220 kV using six single-phase power autotransformers ODTGA 666667/220, combined into two groups (three phases each). The transformers are located on a platform adjoining the HPP building. The HPP power output to the power grid is from the 110/220 kV open switchyard via five transmission lines:

- 220 kV TL "Tsimlyanskaya HPP – SS Sh-30"
- 220 kV TL "Tsimlyanskaya HPP – Volgodonsk CHP-2"
- 110 kV TL "Tsimlyanskaya HPP – SS Tsimlyanskaya"
- 110 kV TL "Tsimlyanskaya HPP – SS VOEZ"
- 110 kV TL "Tsimlyanskaya HPP – SS Northern Portal"

=== Navigation locks ===
External images
- Lock No. 14 and the "Connection of Five Seas" monument
- Lower head of lock No. 15

The ship-passing structures of the Tsimlyansk hydro node are located on the left bank, between earthen dams Nos. 90 and 91. The ship-passing structure route crosses the earthen dam and exits to the river in the downstream 5 km below the main HPP structures, outside the impact zone of the flow discharged through the hydro units and spillway dam. The ship-passing structures include a basin, two single-chamber locks with an intermediate channel between them, and a downstream approach channel. The basin is located in the Tsimlyansk Reservoir, creating a protected area from high waves and ensuring calm vessel approach to the locks. Additionally, a river port and timber yard are located in the basin area. The basin is formed by two dikes—northern and eastern—between which is a passage for vessels 400 m wide. The northern dike is built by filling with loess-like loams, with a length of 1,500 m. The eastern dike, 1,580 m long, has a mixed design—the longest section of 1,240 m is hydraulically filled with fine-grained sand, and the rest with limestone and loam fill. The dike slopes facing the reservoir are secured with concrete slabs, and those facing the basin with large stones. The navigation locks are single-chamber, with a 1,593 m long intermediate passing channel between them. The locks are numbered 14 and 15, their design and dimensions match those of the Volga–Don Canal locks (chamber size 145×18 m). The locks are reinforced concrete, with a head filling and emptying system for the chambers. The locks connect to the downstream via a 3,440 m long approach channel. During construction, a reserve was created for a second lock line in the form of a head and partial chamber embedded in the earthen dam.

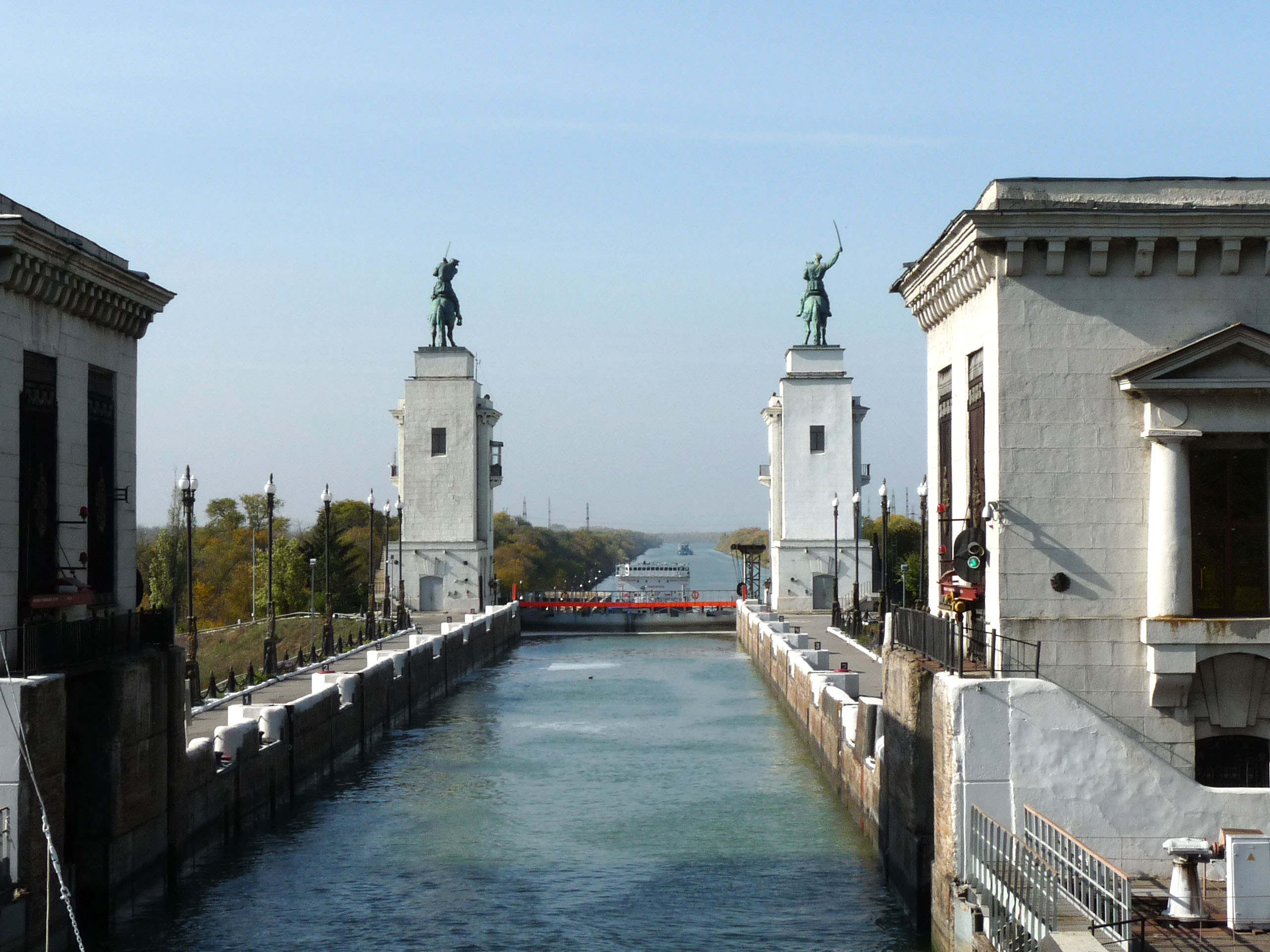
Sculptural group "Cossacks" near the Tsimlyanskaya HPP lock (Rostov Oblast, city of Volgodonsk)

The locks are designed in the monumental architecture style of the time (Stalinist Empire style). The upper head management building of ~~lock No. 14~~ is made in the form of a monumental arch 30 m high. This design choice was to decorate the emergency-repair gate of the lock, suspended between the two upper head buildings. The arch is covered by a pediment with an attic, on which four cast-iron sculpture compositions are placed. Near the upper head of ~~lock~~ No. 14 on a semicircular embankment stands the "Connection of Five Seas" monument, representing a stepped pedestal with embedded sculptural images of ship bows. On the pedestal is a cast-iron sculptural composition (sculptor S. N. Volkov). The lower head management buildings of lock No. 15 are made in the form of two towers 30 m high, topped with 8-meter equestrian statues of Don Cossacks (sculptor G. I. Motovilov).

=== Headworks of the Don Main Canal ===
The headworks of the Don Main Canal is embedded in dam No. 9 and represents a non-pressure seven-opening reinforced concrete pipe consisting of three sections. The structure length is 47.34 m, width (along the head front) is 49 m, each water passage opening is 4.5×7.25 m, total capacity is 250 m^{3}/s. The structure is equipped with flat wheeled main and emergency-repair gates, operated using winches and a bridge crane. Anti-seepage devices include steel sheet piling on the upstream side and drainage in the form of a three-layer reverse filter in the foundation. Water intake from the reservoir is via a concrete-lined supply channel.

=== Reservoir ===
The head structures of the HPP form the large Tsimlyansk Reservoir. The reservoir area at normal backwater level is 2,624 km^{2}, length 360 km, maximum width 40 km, maximum depth 30.8 m. The total and useful capacity of the reservoir is 22.97 and 11.29 km^{3} respectively, allowing multi-year flow regulation (the reservoir is filled in wet years and drawn down in dry years). The normal backwater level mark of the reservoir is 36m above sea level (according to the Baltic Height System), the forced backwater level is 38 m, the dead storage level is 31 m.

== History of construction and operation ==
The construction of the Tsimlyanskaya HPP was part of the Volga–Don waterway project, which involved the construction of the Volga–Don Canal and improvement of navigation conditions on the Don below the canal. The first detailed project of this waterway was developed in 1927–1928 and provided, in addition to the canal, for the construction of ten low-head dams with locks, including one above the Tsimlyanskaya stanitsa. For various reasons, this project was not implemented. The projects of 1933 and 1938 met the same fate, implying, among other things, the creation of a large regulating reservoir near the city of Kalach-na-Donu. In 1944, the design of the Volga–Don waterway was assigned to "Hydroproject", where it was carried out under the leadership of S. Ya. Zhuk. During the design, it was decided to place a large regulating reservoir near the Tsimlyanskaya stanitsa. In this case, several tasks were solved at once—navigable depths were ensured on the most difficult section of the Don from Tsimlyanskaya to Kalach-na-Donu, as well as depths on the lower Don (due to reservoir releases), self-flow irrigation of lands on the left bank became possible, and significant electricity generation. Alternative reservoir location options had significant drawbacks. Thus, the Kumovsky axis, near the entrance to the Volga–Don Canal, allowed creating a capacious reservoir but did not provide self-flow irrigation, required a large volume of dredging works, and construction of additional low-head dams downstream. The Nizhne-Kurmoyarsky axis, 40 km above the Tsimlyanskaya HPP axis, with a favorable valley shape for placing the HPP structures, required routing the Don Main Canal along a heavily indented and steep left river bank, which greatly complicated and increased the cost of construction. Using the Konstantinovsky axis (downstream) would lead to a sharp increase in the flooding area of valuable lands, as well as significant enlargement and cost increase of the HPP structures. The construction of the Volga–Don waterway, including the Volga–Don Shipping Canal, Tsimlyansk hydro node, and Don Main Irrigation Canal with distribution canals, was sanctioned by the Decree of the Council of Ministers of the Soviet Union No. 480-183s dated February 27, 1948, "On the construction of the Volga–Don waterway and the comprehensive use of the water resources of the Lower Don". This decree assigned the project implementation works to the Ministry of Internal Affairs (Soviet Union), with the completion deadline set for 1953 (later shortened by another year). On March 11, 1948, the Minister of Internal Affairs issued Order No. 0148 "On the organization of the construction of the Volgodonsk waterway", and on January 14, 1949, the Tsimlyansk ITL was established. The chief of the Volga–Don waterway construction was appointed the head of the Main Hydropower Construction of the Ministry of Internal Affairs, Major General Y. D. Rapoport, and the chief engineer of the construction was Major General S. Ya. Zhuk. The chief of the construction management and correctional labor camp of the Tsimlyansk hydro node was appointed Major General A. P. Gorshkov (from May 1950—Colonel V. A. Barabanov), and the chief engineer was N. V. Razin. Preparatory works for the construction of the Tsimlyanskaya HPP (construction of housing, access roads, warehouses, construction base, quarries, temporary diesel power station) began in 1948. At the same time, exploration and design works continued, completed in 1949, when Hydroproject prepared the technical project of the hydro node. Construction of the main station structures began on February 10, 1949, with the excavation of the spillway dam and HPP building pit. The station was built at a very fast pace—the riverbed was closed on September 23, 1951, and filling of the Tsimlyansk Reservoir began in January 1952. The first hydro unit of the Tsimlyanskaya HPP was commissioned on June 6, 1952, the second on July 19, 1952, the third on March 9, 1953, the fourth (fish ladder unit) on April 27, 1953, and the fifth on March 29, 1954. The Tsimlyansk hydro node was accepted into permanent operation by the state commission on July 22, 1953. During the construction of the Tsimlyanskaya HPP, classified as one of the "Great Construction Projects of Communism", a total of 29.5 million m^{3} of earth excavation and 46.6 million m^{3} of soft soil embankment, 869,000 m^{3} of rock excavation, 910,000 m^{3} of stone filter and drainage fill, 1,908,000 m^{3} of concrete and reinforced concrete placement, and 21,000 t of metal structures and mechanisms assembly were performed. The total cost of the hydro node construction works (including the industrial base, housing, and reservoir bed preparation) was 3.013 billion rubles in 1950 prices. The main labor force in the construction was Gulag prisoners (thus, as of December 1, 1950, 43,034 prisoners and 5,962 free-hired personnel worked on the Tsimlyansk hydro node construction). The total number of Tsimlyansk ITL prisoners reached 47,000 people, and a total of 103,884 people passed through the camp. In the initial construction stage (until the end of 1949), the labor of German prisoners of war was also used. Compared to previous hydraulic engineering projects, the Volga–Don waterway construction was relatively well mechanized (in particular, earthworks—by 96.7%), with wide use of excavators and dredgers. Initially, the Tsimlyanskaya HPP capacity was 164 MW (four 40 MW hydro units and a 4 MW fish ladder unit), and after hydro generator modernization in 1978–1981, the main hydro unit capacity increased to 50 MW, raising the station capacity to 204 MW. Since 1970, the Tsimlyanskaya HPP has been operated in a forced mode, where water flows through the hydro units are determined not by hydropower needs but by water transport and other non-energy water users. In 1976–1977, the station's block transformers were modernized into autotransformers. By the early 1990s, the station equipment, having operated for over 40 years, was physically and morally obsolete, so replacement works began. In 1997–1999, hydro unit No. 3 was replaced, in 2000–2001—unit No. 2, in 2008–2012—unit No. 4. The capacity of each new unit increased to 52.5 MW, so as of September 29, 2012, the Tsimlyanskaya HPP capacity is 211.5 MW. Other HPP equipment is also being modernized; in particular, in 2000–2007, all segmental gates of the spillway dam were replaced, and new SF6 generator circuit breakers and switchyard breakers were installed. From the beginning of operation, the Tsimlyanskaya HPP was part of the district energy management "Rostovenergo", which in 1988 was transformed into the energy and electrification production association "Rostovenergo", on the basis of which in 1993 JSC "Rostovenergo" was created. During the RAO "UES of Russia" reform, the Tsimlyanskaya HPP, along with several other regional power stations, entered JSC "Rostov Generating Company", which in 2006 was merged into JSC "Southern Generating Company – TGK-8". In 2010, thermal power stations were spun off from JSC "Southern Generating Company – TGK-8", and its name and ownership form were changed to LLC "Lukoil-Ekoenergo".

== Consequences of creation ==
=== Economic importance ===
The Tsimlyanskaya HPP ensures large-tonnage navigation on the Don River—the hydro node is an important part of the Volga–Don shipping route. The Tsimlyansk Reservoir is located in place of the most difficult, with a large number of shoals, 186 km section of the Don, completely solving the problem of ensuring the required (at least 4 m) navigable depths in the section. The reservoir provides water supply to the Volga–Don Shipping Canal (designed water intake up to 320 million m^{3} per year), as well as necessary depths at the canal entrance. By accumulating water in the reservoir during the flood period and releasing it during low water, the Tsimlyanskaya HPP ensures elevated water levels and navigable depths on the lower Don, and also significantly reduces the required volume of dredging works downstream. The HPP operation mode provides for the so-called navigation release—increased water flows to ensure the necessary depths (at least 3.4 m) downstream. An important task of the Tsimlyansk hydro node is the irrigation of arid lands; using canals and irrigation systems fed by the reservoir, it was planned to irrigate up to 750,000 ha of agricultural land, as well as swamping about 2 million ha. The Tsimlyansk Reservoir feeds the Don Main Canal (the canal's water intake structure is embedded in the HPP earthen dam)—one of the largest irrigation systems in Rostov Oblast. The canal provides irrigation for 163,000 ha (including 32,760 ha of rice lands), as well as swamping of 525,000 ha of agricultural land, water supply to populated areas with a total population of over 200,000 people, and several pond fish farming facilities. In addition, several other irrigation canals originate from the Don Canal—Proletarsky (irrigation area 77,700 ha), Nizhne-Donskoy, Bagayevsky, Verkhne-Salsky, and it also replenishes the Azov Main Canal and Vesyolovskoye Reservoir. Additionally, several other irrigation systems are located on the shores of the Tsimlyansk Reservoir and the Volga–Don Canal it feeds. As of 2011, 1.356 km^{3} of water was annually withdrawn from the Tsimlyansk Reservoir for irrigation, including 1.289 km^{3} to the Don Main Canal. The Tsimlyansk Reservoir provides water supply to a significant number of populated areas (including the cities of Tsimlyansk and Volgodonsk), as well as several industrial enterprises, the largest of which is the Rostov Nuclear Power Plant, whose cooling pond was created by cutting off part of the reservoir's water area. Having a capacious reservoir, the Tsimlyanskaya HPP solves the task of protecting populated areas and lands downstream from floods. Thus, since the beginning of operation, the maximum observed inflow to the reservoir was 6,000 m^{3}/s (in 1979), and the maximum discharge to the downstream was 2,270 m^{3}/s, i.e., water flows were reduced by more than half. The Tsimlyansk Reservoir has great fishery importance, holding a leading place in commercial fish catch among Russia's inland water bodies—about 5–6 thousand tons per year, roughly corresponding to the catch from all reservoirs of the Volga-Kama Cascade combined. The fish productivity of the reservoir is 60–80 kg/ha, which is considered a high indicator. During operation, the Tsimlyanskaya HPP has generated a large amount of cheap renewable electricity; the station is the largest source of high-maneuverable capacity in Rostov Oblast. At the same time, electricity generation is not the primary task of the Tsimlyansk hydro node, whose operation mode is subordinated to navigation, water supply, and other non-energy water users, with electricity production carried out incidentally.

Economic indicators of Tsimlyanskaya HPP
Year	2010	2011	2012
Electricity generation, million kWh	585.4	458.3	532.1
Average electricity tariff, rub/kWh	0.79	0.89	0.91
Installed capacity utilization factor, %	32	25	29
Marginal profit, thousand rub	486,628	708,002	769,761

=== Social and environmental consequences ===
When creating the Tsimlyansk Reservoir, 263,600 ha of land were flooded, including 9,600 ha of homesteads and vegetable gardens, 700 ha of gardens and vineyards, 35,700 ha of arable land, 71,100 ha of hayfields, 78,200 ha of pastures, and 30,100 ha of forests and shrubs. The flooding zone included 164 rural settlements and partially the city of Kalach-na-Donu; 13,716 yards and 507 small industrial facilities were relocated. Some sections of the Stalingrad–Likhaya railway embankment required relocation or reinforcement, and a new Chirsky Bridge over the Don was built. Several sections of highways and communication lines were relocated to new sites. In the city of Kalach-na-Donu and the kutor Stalingdorf of Kalachevsky District, protective structures in the form of embankments and a network of drainage canals were built. The flooding zone included an archaeological site—the ancient fortress Sarkel, and in 1949–1951, during reservoir bed preparation for flooding, archaeologists surveyed less than a third of the object's area. The change in the Don's water regime after the Tsimlyanskaya HPP construction (reduction in flood heights, floodplain flooding area, and thus spawning grounds area), as well as the hindrance of fish passage to spawning through the HPP structures (partially mitigated by the fish ladder), had a strong negative impact on the natural reproduction of fish stocks in the Don and the Sea of Azov (for anadromous and semi-anadromous fish). This situation was predicted by the hydro node designers; to compensate for the damage to the fishery, a number of fish hatcheries were built, where artificial reproduction of valuable fish species (sturgeon, shemaiah, crucian carp, zander, bream) is carried out. These measures proved effective—for example, if in 1958–1960 there were 1.8 million sturgeon in the Sea of Azov, then in 1970–1972 their number increased to 4.1 million, in 1975 to 8.1 million, in 1980 to 11.9 million, and in 1988 to 17.6 million individuals. Subsequently, with the reduction in juvenile releases by hatcheries due to the economic problems of the 1990s, as well as deterioration of the Azov Sea's forage base, the number of valuable fish species sharply decreased. The creation of the Tsimlyansk Reservoir led to an increase in irreversible evaporation losses from its surface (estimated at 1.5 km^{3} annually), contributing to the reduction of river runoff to the Sea of Azov (estimated at 7.5 km^{3}) and an increase in its salinity.

== Bibliography ==
- Правила использования Цимлянского водохранилища [Rules for the Use of the Tsimlyansk Reservoir]. M.: Росводресурсы. 2014. p. 401. Archived from the original on 2014-12-05.
- Гидроэлектростанции России [Hydroelectric Power Stations of Russia]. M.: Типография Института Гидропроект. 1998. p. 467.
- Заключённые на стройках коммунизма. ГУЛАГ и объекты энергетики в СССР. Собрание документов и фотографий [Prisoners on the Construction Sites of Communism. Gulag and Energy Facilities in the USSR. Collection of Documents and Photographs]. M.: Российская политическая энциклопедия (РОССПЭН). 2008. p. 448. ISBN 978-5-8243-0918-8.
- Matishov, G. G.; Savelyeva, O. S. (2019). "Переселение жителей казачьих станиц из зоны затопления Цимлянского водохранилища: культурологический и социально-экономический аспекты" [Resettlement of residents of Cossack stanitsas from the Tsimlyansk Reservoir flooding zone: cultural and socio-economic aspects] (PDF). Наука юга России. 15 (2): 97–107. doi:10.7868/S25000640190210. ISSN 2500-0640.
