= Krasnoyarsk (disambiguation) =

Krasnoyarsk is a city in Russia.

Krasnoyarsk may also refer to:

- Krasnoyarsk Krai, a federal subject of Russia
- Krasnoyarsk Urban Okrug, a municipal formation which the krai city of Krasnoyarsk in Krasnoyarsk Krai, Russia is incorporated as
- Krasnoyarsk (inhabited locality), several inhabited localities in Russia
- Krasnoyarsk Dam, a dam on the Yenisei River, Russia
- Krasnoyarsk Reservoir, an artificial lake created by the construction of the Krasnoyarsk Dam
- Russian submarine Krasnoyarsk (K-173), Russian Oscar-class submarine
- 38046 Krasnoyarsk, an outer main-belt asteroid
- Krasnojarsk (meteorite), the first pallasite meteorite ever found
