= Krasnoyarskoye, Altai Krai =

Krasnoyarskoye Красноярское
- Village
- Location within Altai Krai Location within Russia
- Coordinates: 51°44′N 81°35′E
- Country: Russia
- Region: Altai Krai
- District: Pospelikhinsky District
- Time zone: UTC+7:00

Krasnoyarskoye (Russian: Красноярское) is a rural locality (a selo) in Krasnoyarsky Selsoviet, Pospelikhinsky District, Altai Krai, Russia. The population was 790 in 2014. There are 10 streets.

== Geography ==
Krasnoyarskoye is located 35 km southwest of Pospelikha (the district's administrative centre) by road. Novy Mir is the nearest rural locality.
