= Krasnoyarsky, Ilovlinsky District, Volgograd Oblast =

Krasnoyarsky Красноярский
- Khutor
- Location within Volgograd Oblast Location within Russia
- Coordinates: 49°23′N 44°05′E
- Country: Russia
- Region: Volgograd Oblast
- District: Ilovlinsky District
- Time zone: UTC+4:00

Krasnoyarsky (Russian: Красноярский) is a rural locality (a khutor) in Kondrashovskoye Rural Settlement, Ilovlinsky District, Volgograd Oblast, Russia. The population was 322 as of 2010. There are 8 streets.

== Geography ==
Krasnoyarsky is located in steppe, on the bank of the Ilovlya River, on south of the Volga Upland, 15 km northeast of Ilovlya (the district's administrative centre) by road. Avilov is the nearest rural locality.
