= Krasnoyarsky, Chernyshkovsky District, Volgograd Oblast =

Krasnoyarsky Красноярский
- Settlement
- Location within Volgograd Oblast Location within Russia
- Coordinates: 48°24′N 42°16′E
- Country: Russia
- Region: Volgograd Oblast
- District: Chernyshkovsky District
- Time zone: UTC+4:00

Krasnoyarsky (Russian: Красноярский) is a rural locality (a settlement) and the administrative center of Krasnoyarskoye Rural Settlement, Chernyshkovsky District, Volgograd Oblast, Russia. The population was 750 as of 2010. There are 13 streets.

== Geography ==
Krasnoyarsky is located 6 km southeast of Chernyshkovsky (the district's administrative centre) by road. Chernyshkovsky is the nearest rural locality.
