= Kotelnikovo, Arkhangelsk Oblast =

Kotelnikovo Котельниково
- Village
- Location within Arkhangelsk Oblast Location within Russia
- Coordinates: 61°06′N 46°38′E
- Country: Russia
- Region: Arkhangelsk Oblast
- District: Kotlassky District
- Time zone: UTC+3:00

Kotelnikovo (Russian: Котельниково) is a rural locality (a village) in Cheryomushskoye Rural Settlement of Kotlassky District, Arkhangelsk Oblast, Russia. The population was 6 as of 2010.

== Geography ==
Kotelnikovo is located 18 km south of Kotlas (the district's administrative centre) by road. Peschanitsa is the nearest rural locality.
