= Kotelnikovo Air Base =

Russian military base

Kotelnikovo
- Котельниково
- Kotelnikovo, Volgograd Oblast in Russia
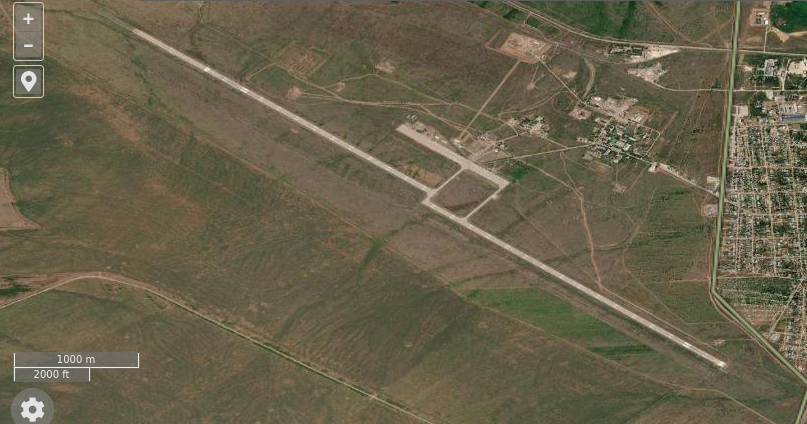
- Satellite imagery of Kotelnikovo air base

Site information
- Type: Air Base
- Owner: Ministry of Defence
- Operator: Russian Aerospace Forces

Location
- Shown within Volgograd Oblast Kotelnikovo (Russia)
- Coordinates: 47°38′05″N 43°05′53″E

Site history
- In use: present

Airfield information
- Identifiers: ICAO: URRK
- Elevation: 62 metres (203 ft) AMSL
Runways
Direction	Length and surface
12L/30R	2,500 metres (8,202 ft) Concrete
12R/30L	2,500 metres (8,202 ft) Concrete

Kotelnikovo (Russian: Котельниково) is an airbase of the Russian Air Force located near Kotelnikovo, Volgograd Oblast, Russia.

The base is home to the 704th Training Aviation Regiment.

== History ==
The 704th Training Aviation Regiment was established in 1946 on the basis of the Kaczyn Higher Military Aviation School of Pilots. In 1954, the regiment was relocated to Kotelnikovo.

From 1955 to 1958, an asphalt-concrete runway was built at the airfield.

Until October 1960, the regiment's cadets were trained on MiG-15M and MiG-15UTI aircraft. In 1967, the regiment began training cadets on supersonic MiG-21 combat aircraft.

Since 1991, the regiment has begun training cadets on L-39 training aircraft. The regiment's operations were supported by the 864th Separate Airfield Support Battalion (military unit 65228) and the 1338th Separate Communications and Radio Support Battalion (military unit 40749).

On November 4, 2010, by a directive of the Minister of Defense of the Russian Federation, the 704th Training Aviation Regiment and the 864th Separate Airfield Support Battalion and the 1338th Radio Support Battalion were reorganized into the 213th Training Aviation Base of the 2nd Category and assigned the code name military unit 55624.

In 2022, during the Russo-Ukrainian war, rockets were launched from the base vicinity towards Ukraine.

== See also ==
- List of military airbases in Russia
