= Kotelnikovo, Spassky Selsoviet, Vologodsky District, Vologda Oblast =

Kotelnikovo Котельниково
- Village
- Location within Vologda Oblast Location within Russia
- Coordinates: 59°07′N 39°48′E
- Country: Russia
- Region: Vologda Oblast
- District: Vologodsky District
- Time zone: UTC+3:00

Kotelnikovo (Russian: Котельниково) is a rural locality (a village) in Spasskoye Rural Settlement, Vologodsky District, Vologda Oblast, Russia. The population was 6 as of 2002.

== Geography ==
The distance to Vologda is 12 km, to Nepotyagovo is 2 km. Zhilino, Tropino, Mozhayskoye, Konishchevo, Kudrino are the nearest rural localities.
