= Tsimlyansk =

Town in Rostov Oblast, Russia

Tsimlyansk Цимлянск
- Town
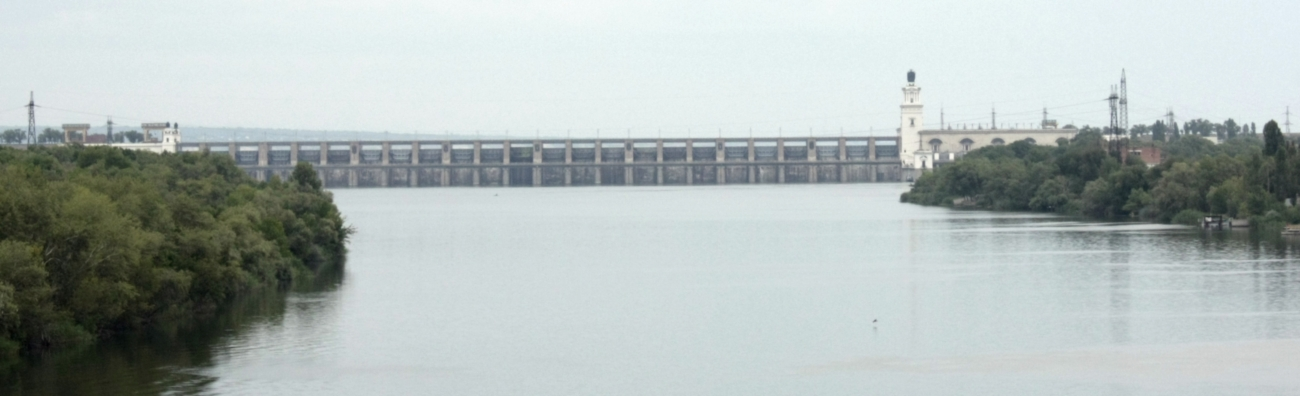
- Tsimlyansk Reservoir

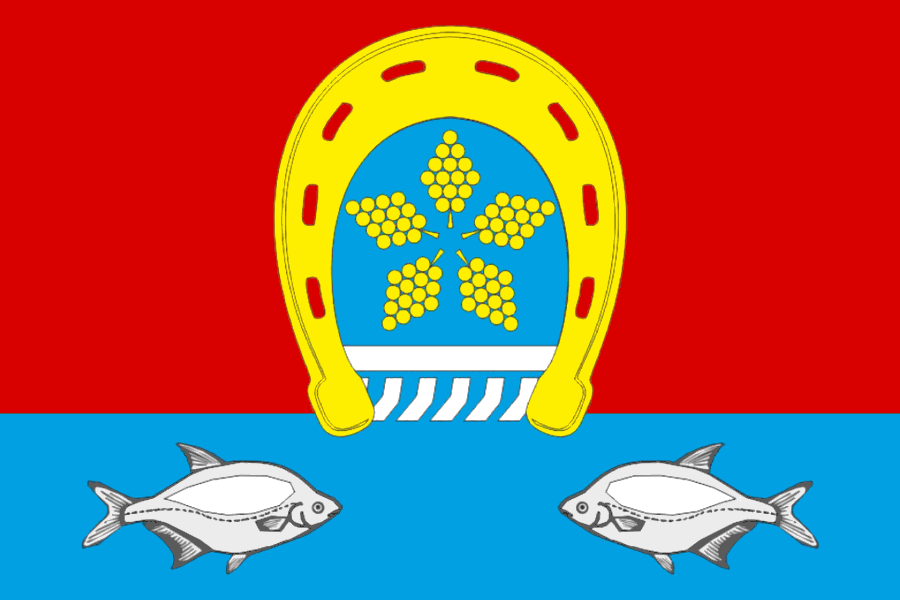
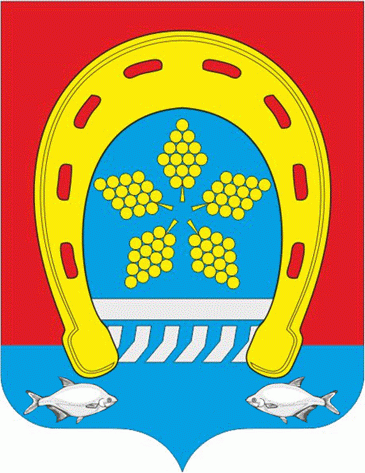
- Flag Coat of arms
- Interactive map of Tsimlyansk
- Location of Tsimlyansk Tsimlyansk (Rostov Oblast)
- Coordinates: 47°38′52″N 42°05′46″E
- Country: Russia
- Federal subject: Rostov Oblast
- Administrative district: Tsimlyansky District
- Urban settlementSelsoviet: Tsimlyanskoye
- Founded: 1672
- Town status since: 1961

Population (2010 Census)
  - Total: 15,028
  - Estimate (2021): 14,731 (−2%)

Administrative status
  - Capital of: Tsimlyansky District, Tsimlyanskoye Urban Settlement

Municipal status
  - Municipal district: Tsimlyansky Municipal District
  - Urban settlement: Tsimlyanskoye Urban Settlement
  - Capital of: Tsimlyansky Municipal District, Tsimlyanskoye Urban Settlement
- Time zone: UTC+3 (MSK)
- Postal codes: 347320, 347323, 347325
- OKTMO ID: 60657101001
- Website: tsimlyansk-gorod.ru

Tsimlyansk (Russian: Цимля́нск) is a town and the administrative center of Tsimlyansky District in Rostov Oblast, Russia, located on the right bank of the Don River, on the coast of Tsimlyansk Reservoir, 236 kilometers (147 mi) northeast of Rostov-on-Don, the administrative center of the oblast. Population: 15,028 (2010 census); 15,444 (2002 census); 15,343 (1989 Soviet census).

== History ==
It was founded in 1672 by the Don Cossacks as Ust-Tsimla (Усть-Цимла). Until 1950, it was known as the stanitsa of Tsimlyanskaya (Цимля́нская). In 1950–1952, the stanitsa was resettled in the new location due to the construction of the Tsimlyansk Reservoir and the Tsimlyansk Hydroelectric Station. It was granted town status in 1961.

== Administrative and municipal status ==
Within the framework of administrative divisions, Tsimlyansk serves as the administrative center of Tsimlyansky District. As an administrative division, it is incorporated within Tsimlyansky District as Tsimlyanskoye Urban Settlement. As a municipal division, this administrative unit also has urban settlement status and is a part of Tsimlyansky Municipal District.

== Geography ==
=== Climate ===
Climate data for Tsimlyansk (1991-2020, extremes 1952-present)
Month	Jan	Feb	Mar	Apr	May	Jun	Jul	Aug	Sep	Oct	Nov	Dec	Year
Record high °C (°F)	15.4 (59.7)	19.6 (67.3)	26.9 (80.4)	31.1 (88.0)	35.6 (96.1)	37.6 (99.7)	40.2 (104.4)	40.9 (105.6)	37.3 (99.1)	30.6 (87.1)	20.9 (69.6)	15.8 (60.4)	40.9 (105.6)
Mean daily maximum °C (°F)	−1.1 (30.0)	0.1 (32.2)	6.3 (43.3)	15.5 (59.9)	22.3 (72.1)	27.5 (81.5)	30.1 (86.2)	29.5 (85.1)	22.6 (72.7)	14.8 (58.6)	6.0 (42.8)	0.7 (33.3)	14.5 (58.1)
Daily mean °C (°F)	−3.7 (25.3)	−3.3 (26.1)	2.1 (35.8)	10.1 (50.2)	16.8 (62.2)	21.9 (71.4)	24.5 (76.1)	23.9 (75.0)	17.5 (63.5)	10.6 (51.1)	3.0 (37.4)	−1.9 (28.6)	10.1 (50.2)
Mean daily minimum °C (°F)	−6.0 (21.2)	−5.9 (21.4)	−0.9 (30.4)	5.8 (42.4)	12.3 (54.1)	17.0 (62.6)	19.6 (67.3)	18.9 (66.0)	13.2 (55.8)	7.2 (45.0)	0.6 (33.1)	−4.1 (24.6)	6.5 (43.7)
Record low °C (°F)	−31.4 (−24.5)	−31.8 (−25.2)	−23.8 (−10.8)	−8.5 (16.7)	−0.7 (30.7)	3.6 (38.5)	9.3 (48.7)	4.8 (40.6)	−1.2 (29.8)	−9.7 (14.5)	−27.0 (−16.6)	−27.8 (−18.0)	−31.8 (−25.2)
Average precipitation mm (inches)	43.3 (1.70)	34.5 (1.36)	40.5 (1.59)	27.6 (1.09)	52.2 (2.06)	40.3 (1.59)	42.8 (1.69)	20.7 (0.81)	38.2 (1.50)	42.6 (1.68)	37.6 (1.48)	46.2 (1.82)	466.5 (18.37)
Average precipitation days (≥ 1 mm)	9	8	7	5	8	6	6	3	5	6	7	9	79
Average relative humidity (%)	85	83	77	64	63	59	57	53	64	73	83	86	71
Source 1: pogoda.ru.net
Source 2: NOAA
