= Kotelnikovo, Zabaykalsky Krai =

Kotelnikovo Котельниково
- Selo
- Location within Zabaykalsky Krai Location within Russia
- Coordinates: 52°00′N 116°00′E
- Country: Russia
- Region: Zabaykalsky Krai
- District: Nerchinsky District
- Time zone: UTC+9:00

Kotelnikovo (Russian: Котельниково) is a rural locality (a selo) in Nerchinsky District, Zabaykalsky Krai, Russia. Population: 87 (2021 census); 90 (2010 census); 69 (2002 census); There are 3 streets in this selo.

== Geography ==
This rural locality is located 30 km from Nerchinsk (the district's administrative centre), 200 km from Chita (capital of Zabaykalsky Krai) and 5,440 km from Moscow. Andronnikovo is the nearest rural locality.
