= Tsimlyansky District =

Tsimlyansky District Цимлянский район (Russian)
- District
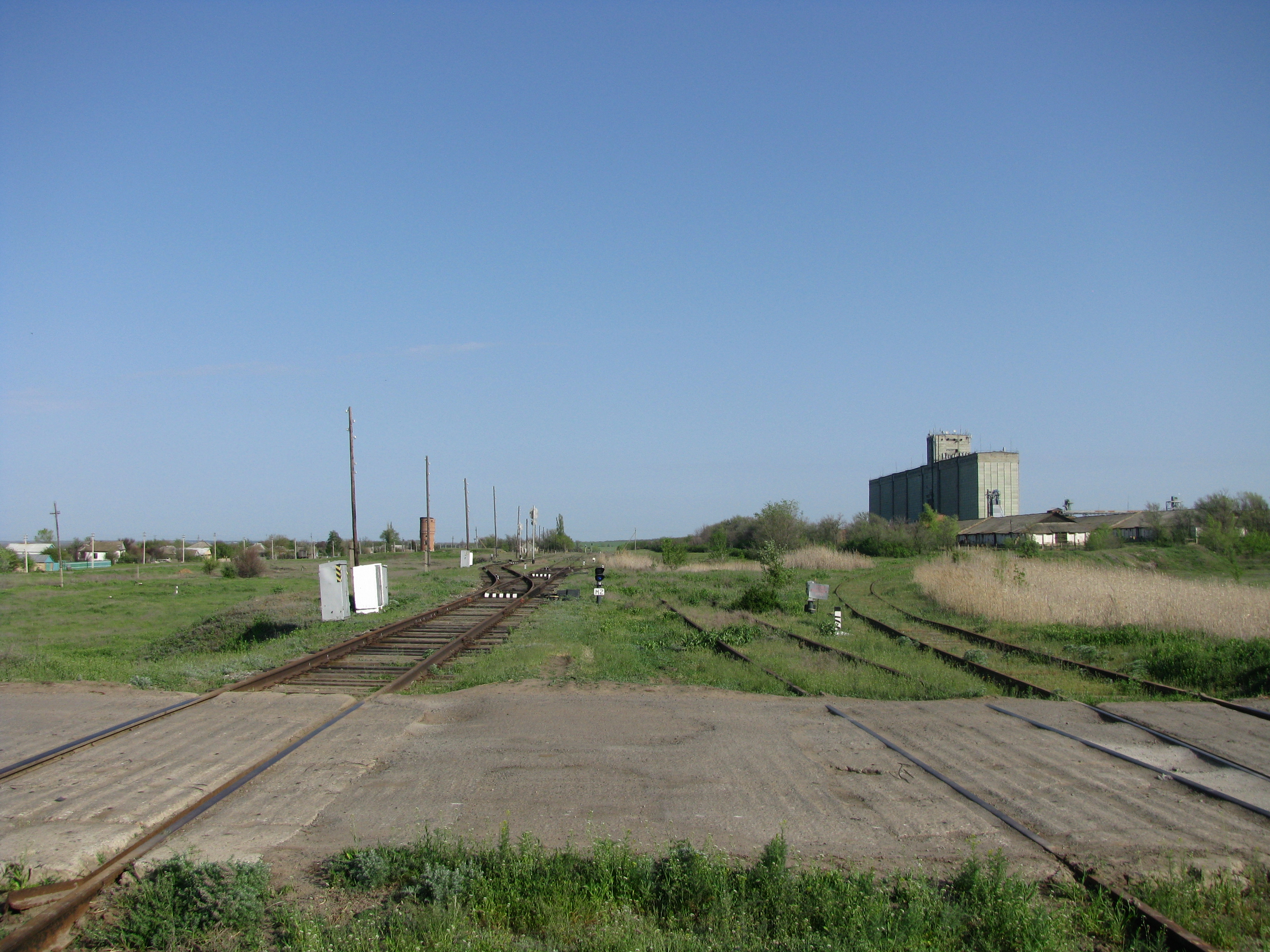
- Grain elevators in Tsimlyansky District

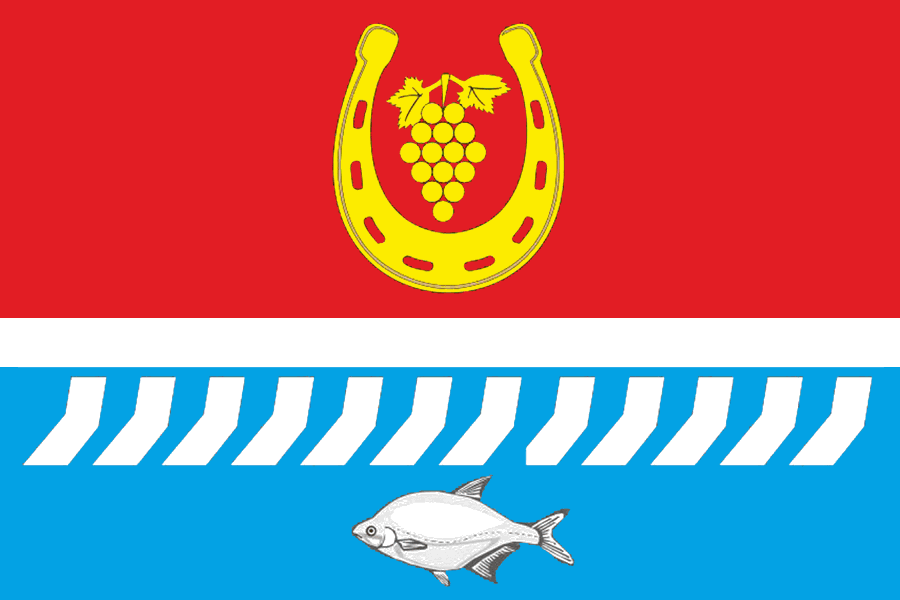
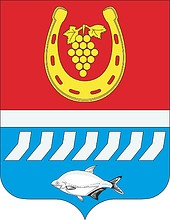
- Flag Coat of arms
- Location of Tsimlyansky District in Rostov Oblast
- Coordinates: 47°39′N 42°06′E
- Country: Russia
- Federal subject: Rostov Oblast
- Established: 1924
- Administrative center: Tsimlyansk

Area
  - Total: 2,529 km^{2} (976 sq mi)

Population (2010 Census)
  - Total: 34,222
  - Density: 13.53/km^{2} (35.05/sq mi)
  - Urban: 43.9%
  - Rural: 56.1%

Administrative structure
  - Administrative divisions: 1 Urban settlements, 6 Rural settlements
  - Inhabited localities: 1 cities/towns, 28 rural localities

Municipal structure
  - Municipally incorporated as: Tsimlyansky Municipal District
  - Municipal divisions: 1 urban settlements, 6 rural settlements
- Time zone: UTC+3 (MSK)
- OKTMO ID: 60657000
- Website: http://cimlyanck.donland.ru/

Tsimlyansky District (Russian: Цимля́нский райо́н) is an administrative and municipal district (raion), one of the forty-three in Rostov Oblast, Russia. It is located in the east of the oblast. The area of the district is 2,529 square kilometers (976 sq mi). Its administrative center is the town of Tsimlyansk. Population: 34,222 (2010 Census); 35,998 (2002 census); 33,851 (1989 Soviet census). The population of Tsimlyansk accounts for 43.9% of the district's total population.
