= Croatian Orthodox Church =

Religious body created during World War II

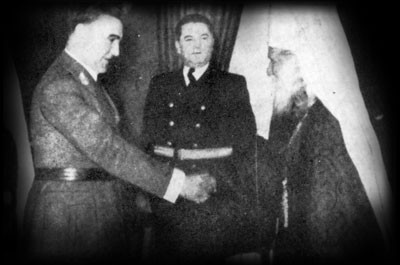
Ante Pavelić (left) and Andrija Artuković (in the middle) meet Patriarch Germogen.

The Croatian Orthodox Church (Croatian: Hrvatska pravoslavna crkva) was a religious body created during World War II by the Fascist Ustaše regime in the Independent State of Croatia (NDH). It was created in order to assimilate the remaining Serb minority and also to control other Orthodox communities into a state-based Eastern Orthodox Church.

In 1942, NDH authorities made a move to organize a domestic Orthodox Church. This was part of a policy of Croatisation and to eliminate Serb culture from Axis Croatia. The church lasted from 1942–45, and was intended to serve as a national church to which Serbs living in Croatia would convert, thus making it possible to describe them as "Croats of Eastern Orthodox faith". The Croatian Orthodox Church was managed by collaborationist Savić Marković Štedimlija. The body ceased in the end of World War II. There were some discussions during the 1990s, after the breakup of Yugoslavia, regarding the revival of such a church.

== History ==
The Croatian Orthodox Church was created due to the loss of a significant part of the territory to Partisans and Chetniks, as well as the additional German pressure over growing anarchy in the country caused by the persecution of Serbs, which is why a concession to the Serb population was deemed necessary.

The church was formed by a government statute (No. XC-800-Z-1942) on 4 April 1942. On 5 June, using a statute issued by the government, the church's constitution was passed. The church lasted until the collapse of the NDH. A small number of the Serb clergy joined it but the Serbian Church hierarchy along with ordinary Serbs rejected it. Many or most of the church's priests were Serbian priests compelled to change churches in order to survive, along with émigré priests from Russia.

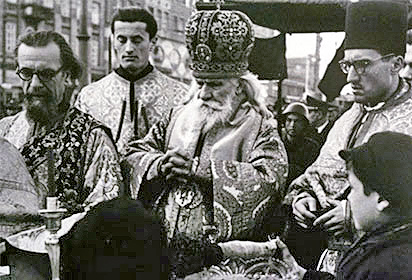
Patriarch Germogen (center) with clergy of the Croatian Orthodox Church.

On 7 June, White Russian émigré Germogen Maximov, a bishop of the Russian Orthodox Church Outside of Russia (ROCOR), became its leader. His enthronement was publicized by the Ustaše regime and the official ceremony took place in front of an armed guard, with the speaker of the Croatian parliament, mayor of Zagreb and several ministers in attendance. He was executed by the Partisans after the war as a collaborator.

Before the Croatian Orthodox Church was formed, the NDH officially described the Eastern Orthodox Church as the "Greek-Eastern Church", and would refer to it as the "Schismatic Church" or the "Greek non-Uniate Church". It was not recognized by the Ecumenical Patriarch of Constantinople. The Church was only recognized by one other Orthodox church, the Romanian Orthodox Church under Patriarch Nicodim, on 4 August 1944 (at the time, Romania was also under the control of the Fascist regime of Ion Antonescu).

According to historian Jozo Tomasevich, although the Church was established as a way to appease the remaining Serb Orthodox population in the NDH, it was ultimately a means to destroying religious, cultural and national ties between Serbs in Serbia and Serbs in the NDH because the Ustaše could not achieve their goal of exterminating the whole Serb population of Croatia. Persecution of Serbs persisted even after its establishment, though it was not as intense as before. In a May 1942 report, the NDH's unofficial envoy to the Holy See, Nikola Rušinović, wrote that Pavelić regarded the Croatian Orthodox Church as "a way to the union between the churches and the disappearance of the schism in Croatia."

== Failed Attempts to Restore ==
After the elections in Croatia in 1990, the far-right Croatian Party of Rights (HSP) put forward the idea of restoring the Croatian Orthodox Church. As part of its fundamental principles, the HSP leadership supported the church's establishment as a means to starting an ethnical cleansing and cultural genocide against the Serbs of Croatia.

On 6 March 1993, Croatian nationalist Juraj Kolarić, dean of the Catholic Faculty of Theology in Zagreb, was reported by the Tanjug news agency as stating that the "Orthodox Church in Croatia should be organized along the Macedonian principle, with its patriarch, and break away as far as territory was concerned, from Serbia”. Kolarić stated that the initiative should come from "Croat Orthodox believers and possible Croatian Orthodox clergy, because then all the conditions for an autocephalous church would be met". Kolarić claimed that "if such a church were formed, it would be recognized by the Patriarch of Constantinople as the Serbian Orthodox Church would never again be present in Croatia."

In 1996, Croatian nationalist writer Metod Viličić stated that "there are also political reasons for establishing the church. If the majority of local Orthodox Christians were to join it in the future, the Serb Orthodoxy in Croatia would finally be exterminated, and thus would block Serb Church interests in Republic of Croatia."

In 2010, the Croatian Orthodox Community, which was still an unregistered association at the time, tried to restore the Croatian Orthodox Church. The initiative to restore the Croatian Orthodox Church failed and was condemned from the Serbian Orthodox Church, the Croatian president of Republic of Croatia Ivo Josipović, and the president of the Croatian government commission for relations with religious communities as a "WWII Ustasha cult sect and hatred spreader".

In 2017, the Croatian Orthodox Church managed to register as an association and Aleksandar Radoev Ivanov was elected as the president of the unrecognized Croatian Orthodox Church. Since then, they have been continuously trying to enroll in the register of religious communities in Croatia. At their first request, the Ministry issued a decision declining their request, against which the Croatian Orthodox Church filed an administrative complaint, which the Administrative Court of Croatia rejected in its ruling. The High Administrative Court, upon the appeal of the Croatian Orthodox Church, annulled the previous decisions and returned the case to the competent ministry, which, in a repeated procedure, on 22 March 2017, again issued a decline decision.

On 4 April 2023, the Australian-Croatian Congress also attempted to restore the church by sending a letter to Prime Minister Andrej Plenković, however it was subsequently rejected.

Although the organization has never been officially registered in Croatia and is not entered in the register of religious communities, it still holds worship service in its space in Domjanićeva street in Zagreb. Andrija Škulić also claims himself as the archbishop of the Croatian Orthodox Church in Croatia. They do not have their own parishes, and have left certain rented buildings due to the high cost of rent. They serve Christmas liturgy in the Mormon church in Zagreb.

== Sources ==
- Paris, Edmond (1961). Genocide in Satellite Croatia, 1941-1945: A Record of Racial and Religious Persecutions and Massacres. Chicago: American Institute for Balkan Affairs.
- Veljko Đ. Đurić (1989). Ustaše i pravoslavlje: hrvatska pravoslavna crkva. Beletra. ISBN 9788674690123.
- Gojo Riste Dakina (1994). Genocide Over the Serbs in the Independent State of Croatia: Be Catholic Or Die. Institute of Contemporary History. ISBN 9788674030585.
- Bartulin, Nevenko (October 2007). "Ideologija nacije i rase: ustaški režim i politika prema Srbima u Nezavisnoj Državi Hrvatskoj 1941-1945" (PDF). Radovi (in Croatian). 39 (1). Institute of Croatian History: 209–241.
- Tomasevich, Jozo (2001). War and Revolution in Yugoslavia, 1941–1945: Occupation and Collaboration. Stanford: Stanford University Press. ISBN 9780804779241.
