= Germogen Maximov =

Russian orthodox priest and metropolit

Germogen
- Metropolitan of Zagreb and whole Croatia
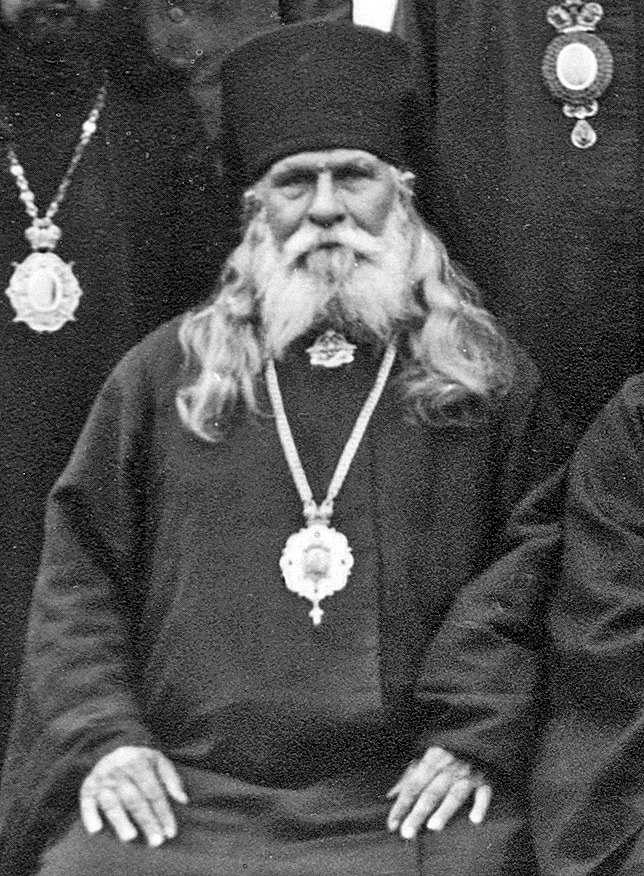
- Germogen in Sremski Karlovci in 1934
- Church: Croatian Orthodox Church
- See: Zagreb
- Installed: 6 June 1942
- Term ended: 30 June 1945
- Predecessor: Church formed
- Successor: Church abolished

Personal details
- Born: Georgy Ivanovich Maximov; 10 January 1861 Nagavskaya, Don Host Oblast, Russian Empire
- Died: 30 June 1945 (aged 84) Zagreb, SR Croatia, Democratic Federal Yugoslavia
- Cause of death: Execution by firing squad

Metropolitan Germogen (Russian: Митрополит Гермоген), secular name Georgy Ivanovich Maximov, (Russian: Георгий Иванович Максимов; 10 January 1861 – 30 June 1945) was bishop of Aksay (9 May 1910 – 1919), Vicar of the Don Diocese, 23rd Bishop of Yekaterinoslav and Novomoskovsk (1919 – November 1920), Governor of the Russian Orthodox municipalities on Crete and North Africa with a seat in Athens (1922), Archbishop of Yekaterinoslav and Novomoskovsk (ROCOR, titular) (1922–1942), member of the Synod of Bishops of the Russian Orthodox Church Abroad (1924–1942), the head (Patriarch or Metropolitan) of the Croatian Orthodox Church (1942–1945).

== Early life ==
Georgy Ivanovich Maximov was born in 1861 in stanitsa Nagavskaya in the Don Host Oblast of the Russian Empire to a Cossack family. His father was a church reader (Russian: псаломщик). He finished elementary and parochial school in Nogavskaya and high school in Ust-Medvedicka. He studied from 1879 to 1882, in the Don Theological Seminary in Novocherkassk, and then attended the Spiritual Academy in Kiev.

After graduating from the Kiev Theological Academy in 1886, he served as a priest in Novocherkassk, where he remained for years. Soon he became principal of the church gymnasium in Ust-Medvedicka in 1894. He left Don Episcopacy in 1902 for Vladikavkaz, where he became rector of the cathedral in Vladikavkaz.

After his wife's death, he was left with six children, the youngest was one year old and the eldest sixteen. By decision of the Holy Synod he was appointed Rector of the seminary in Saratov in 1906.

He became monk in August 1909, adopting the name ″Germogen″, and was elevated to the rank of archimandrite.

In May 1910, he was consecrated as Bishop of Aksay in Saint Petersburg, Vicar of the Don Diocese, and on 18 May, he arrived at the Don Diocese in Novocherkassk for his duties.

In 1919, he became the 23rd Bishop of the Yekaterinoslav and Novomoskovsk (1919 – November 1920)

After the October Revolution in 1917, Germogen condemned Bolsheviks′ campaign against Cossacks in the course of the Russian Civil War. He was a participant of the Southern Church Council of the Russian Church that took place in Stavropol from 18 May to 24 May 1919, at which the Church Administration was formed in Southern Russia that adopted ecclesiastical authority in the territory held by the troops of Anton Denikin's White Army.

In the spring of 1920, he went from Novorossiysk to Yalta by boat (from whence the final evacuation of the White Guard troops took place in November 1920), then on to Constantinople and later to the city of Thessaloniki, Greece.

== Russian Orthodox Church Outside Russia ==
On 30 May 1922, by the decision of the Russian Church Administration Abroad, he was given charge of Russian Orthodox Christians in Greece, Cyprus, and Egypt. Later that year, he was elevated to the rank of Archbishop and appointed to a position in the United States, but he declined to assume it citing illness; afterwards he resided in the Novo Hopovo monastery, Serbia, in retirement.

During 1924–1942, he was a member of the Synod of Bishops of the Russian Orthodox Church Outside of Russia, which was based in Sremski Karlovci.

== Croatian Orthodox Church ==
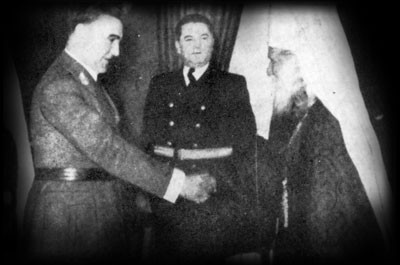
Poglavnik Ante Pavelić, minister Andrija Artuković and Germogen (1942)

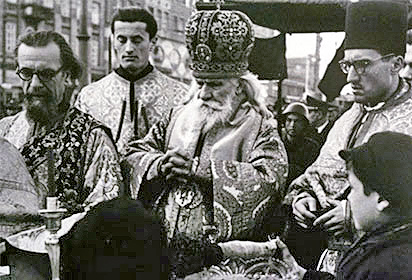
Germogen with clergy of the "Croatian Orthodox Church"

On 3 April 1942, the Ante Pavelić government of the fascist Independent State of Croatia adopted a law that established the "Croatian Orthodox Church".

On 2 June 1942, Germogen was named primate of the Croatian Orthodox Church and enthroned at a ceremony presided over by Patriarch of All Romania Nicodim in the Church of the Holy Transfiguration in Zagreb on 7 June 1942 in presence of top officials of the Independent State of Croatia.

He took the oath a day later. He was immediately condemned by the Russian Orthodox Church Abroad and expelled from its Synod. Patriarch Germogen was, along with other leaders of his organisation, decorated by Pavelić with the Order for Merits.

== Execution ==
After Yugoslav Partisans captured Zagreb on 9 May 1945, the Croatian Orthodox Church was abolished, and Germogen was arrested. He, along with three priests of the Croatian Orthodox Church, was court-martialled on 29 June 1945 and executed by firing squad the next day, at age 84.

== Russian True Orthodox Church ==
On 23 September 2010 the Synod of Bishops of the Russian True Orthodox Church (RIPC) held in the Church of Saint John of Kronstadt in Odessa, Ukraine, declared him a martyr. The RIPC is not in communion with the Russian Orthodox Church nor any of the other canonical Orthodox Churches. The Serbian Orthodox Church and the RIPC's Serbian counterpart Serbian True Orthodox Church expressed outrage over this act.

On 15 December 2010, the Synod of Bishops of the Russian True Orthodox Church issued an official document of the suspension of that Act: "The Synod regrets the hasty decision and requests forgiveness from the clergy and laity of the brotherly Serbian True Orthodox Church (SIPC) and hereby suspends the Act".
