= Pospelikha, Altai Krai =

Village in Pospelikhinsky District, Altai Krai, Russia

Coordinates: 51.988°N 81.827°E

Pospelikha (Russian: Поспелиха) is a rural locality (a selo) and the administrative center of Pospelikhinsky District of Altai Krai, Russia. Population: 14,296 (2010 census); 13,297 (2002 census); 13,131 (1989 Soviet census).
