= Pospelikhinsky District =

Pospelikhinsky District Поспелихинский район (Russian)
- District
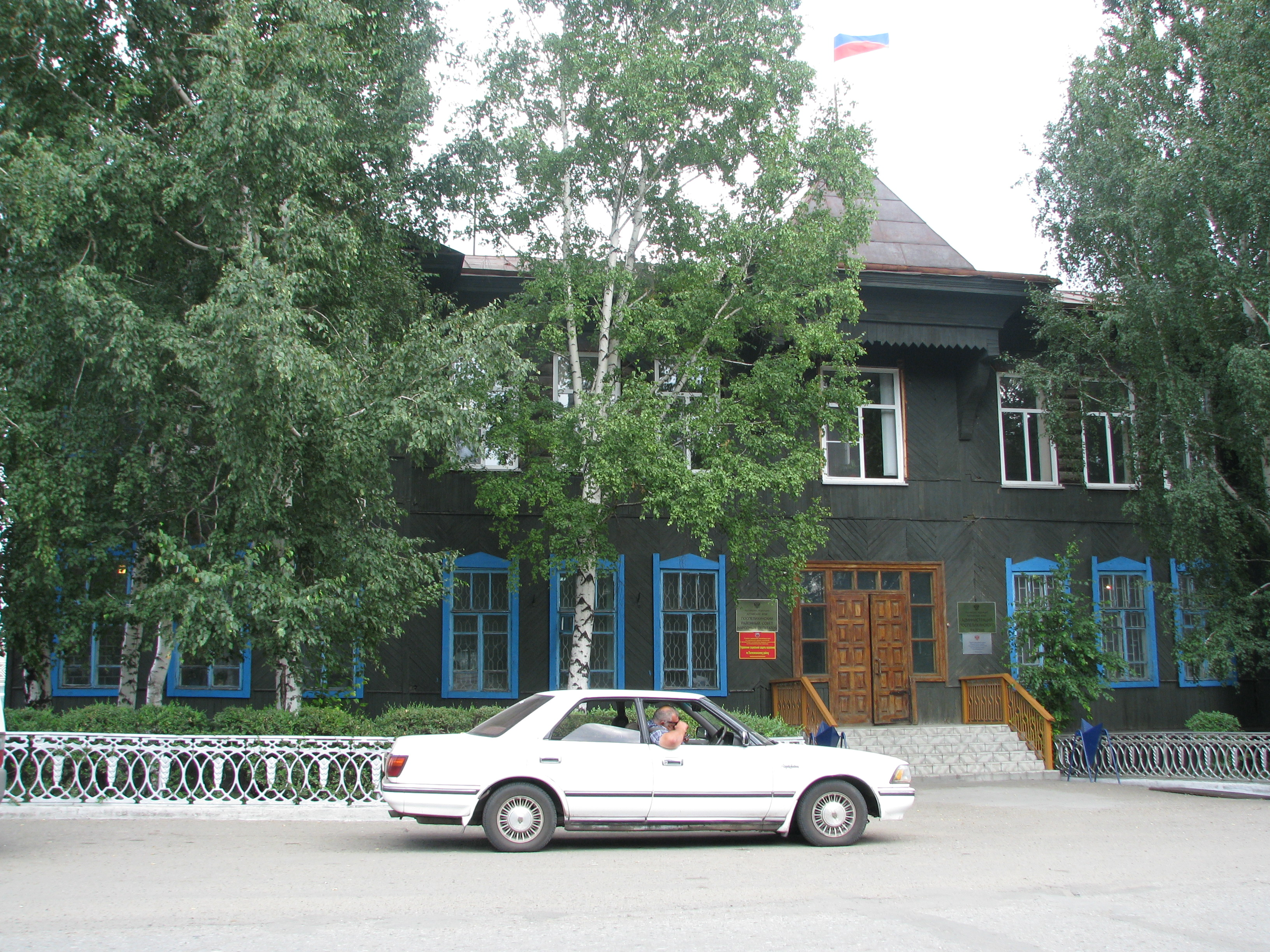
- Pospelikhinsky District Administration building
- Location of Pospelikhinsky District in Altai Krai
- Coordinates: 51°59′N 81°50′E
- Country: Russia
- Federal subject: Altai Krai
- Established: 1924
- Administrative center: Pospelikha

Area
  - Total: 2,423 km^{2} (936 sq mi)

Population (2010 Census)
  - Total: 24,788
  - Density: 10.23/km^{2} (26.50/sq mi)
  - Urban: 0%
  - Rural: 100%

Administrative structure
  - Administrative divisions: 11 selsoviet
  - Inhabited localities: 24 rural localities

Municipal structure
  - Municipally incorporated as: Pospelikhinsky Municipal District
  - Municipal divisions: 0 urban settlements, 11 rural settlements
- Time zone: UTC+7 (MSK+4)
- OKTMO ID: 01634000
- Website: http://pos-admin.ru/

Pospelikhinsky District (Russian: Поспе́лихинский райо́н) is an administrative and municipal district (raion), one of the fifty-nine in Altai Krai, Russia. It is located in the southern central part of the krai. The area of the district is 2,423 square kilometers (936 sq mi). Its administrative center is the rural locality (a selo) of Pospelikha. Population: 24,788 (2010 census); 28,065 (2002 census); 28,560 (1989 Soviet census). The population of Pospelikha accounts for 50.4% of the district's total population.

== Geography ==
Pospelikhinsky District is located in the center of Altai Krai. The terrain is forest-steppe, with relatively flat terrain. Agriculture is supported, as the soils are in places loamy black earth, podzolic, and sandy. The main river through the district is the Aley River, a tributary of the Ob River, which meanders from southwest to northeast through the district. Parallel to the river on the northern edge of the floodplain is Russian federal highway A322 (Barnaul - Rubtsovsk).

Pospelikhinsky District is 175 km southwest of the regional city of Barnaul, 80 km northeast of the border with Kazakhstan, and 2,800_ km east-southeast of Moscow. The area measures 75 km (north-south), and 60 km (west-east); total area is 2,423 km2 (about 1.4% of Altai Krai Oblast). The administrative center is the town of Pospelhika.

The district is bordered on the north by Novichikhinsky District, on the east by Shipunovsky District, on the south by Kuryinsky District, and on the west by Rubtsovsky District.
