= Tsimlyansk Reservoir =

Artificial lake on the Don river, Russia

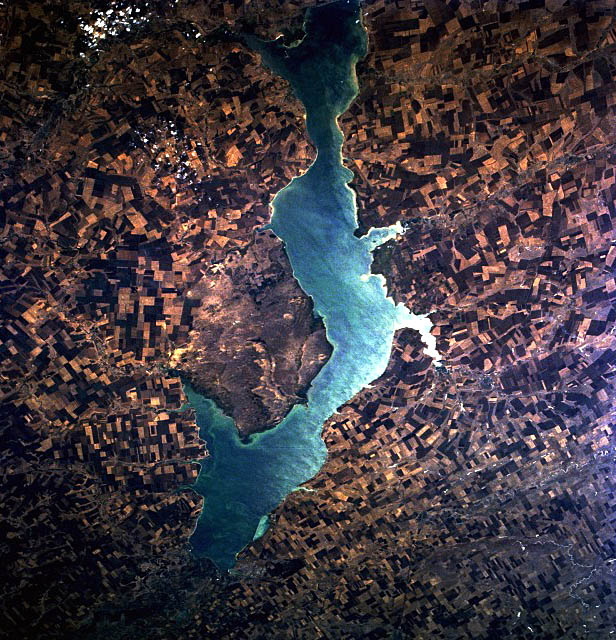
- From space, October 1994 (STS-68)

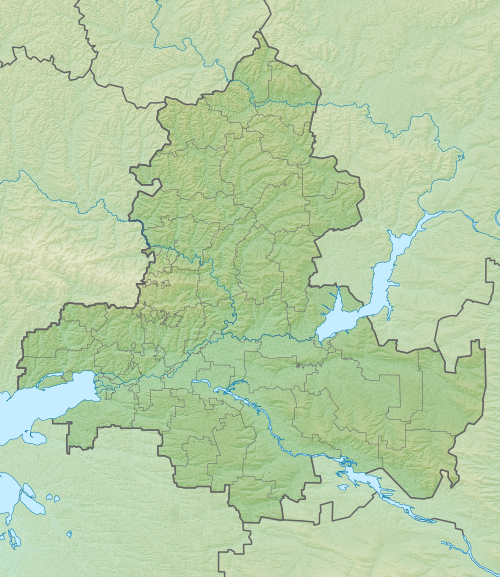
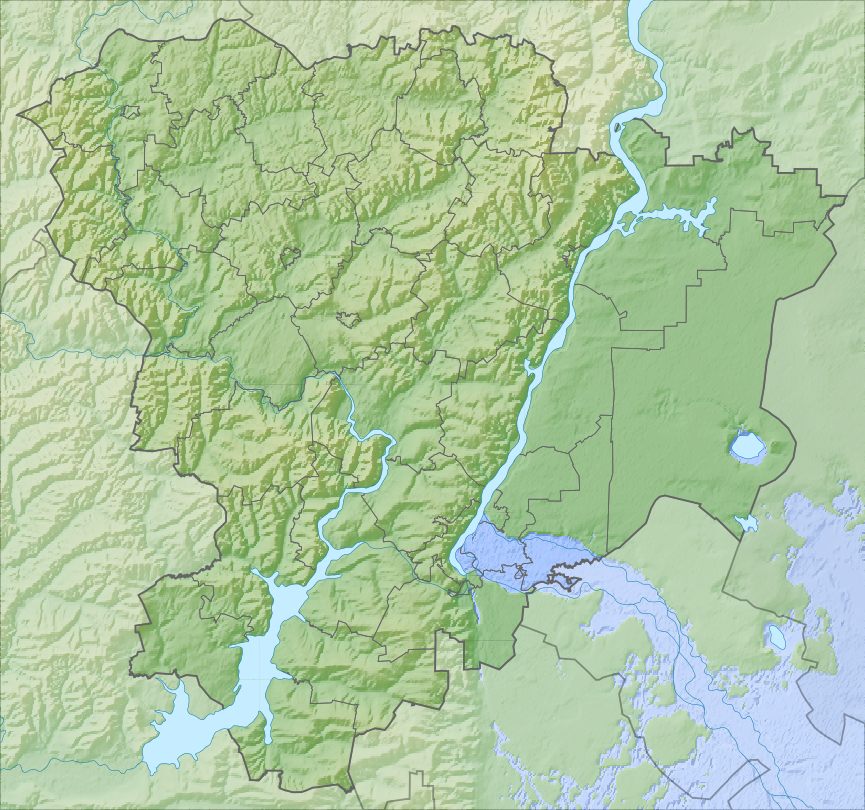
- Location within Rostov Oblast Location within Volgograd Oblast Location within European Russia Location within Russia
- Coordinates: 47°50′N 42°50′E
- Type: reservoir
- Primary inflows: Don River
- Primary outflows: Don River
- Basin countries: Russia

Tsimlyansk Reservoir or Tsimlyanskoye Reservoir (Цимля́нское водохрани́лище) is an artificial lake on the Don River in the territories of Rostov and Volgograd Oblasts at 47°50′N 42°50′E. Completed in 1952, the reservoir is one of the largest in Russia, providing power (Tsimlyansk hydroelectric power station) and irrigation to the Rostov and Volgograd regions. Crops grown around the lake include wheat, rice, cotton, maize, alfalfa, fruit, grapes, and vegetables.

The reservoir, together with the Volga–Don Canal and the lower course of the Don, provides an important waterway between the Volga River / Caspian Sea basin and the Sea of Azov. The Tsimlyansk Dam also provides flood control for the lower Don River basin.

Completion of the lake resulted in strong local industrial growth. In particular, the city of Volgodonsk owes its existence to the Tsimlyansk Dam project.

Under the waters lies the ancient Khazar fortress town of Sarkel.

== Navigation ==
Along with the Volga–Don Canal, the reservoir forms part of a waterway for the shipping of raw materials from the upper Don and Volga–Caspian basins to the lower Don River – Sea of Azov basin and vice versa. According to the federal agency responsible for the maintenance of this waterway (Федеральное Государственное Учреждение "Волго-Донское ГБУВПиС"), guaranteed depth of the main navigable waterway through the reservoir in the navigation season of 2007 was to be maintained at no less than 3.6 meters, with the width of the navigable waterway no less than 50 meters. It was to be available for navigation for 233 days, from April 5 to November 23, 2007.

To descend from the reservoir to the lower Don, ships have to pass two ship locks: the lock in the Tsimlyansky Dam itself (47°33′05″N 42°08′06″E), known as Lock No. 14, followed by Lock No. 15 (47°33′17″N 42°06′42″E) a couple of kilometers farther west. The locks are assigned these numbers because they are considered part of the same sequence of locks as the 13 locks on the Volga–Don Canal itself. During the navigation seasons of 2008 through 2010, the two locks are scheduled to operate from April 2 through December 8.

== See also ==
- Volga–Don Canal
- Sarkel
