= Kotelnikovo, Volgograd Oblast =

Town in Volgograd Oblast, Russia

Kotelnikovo Котельниково
- Town
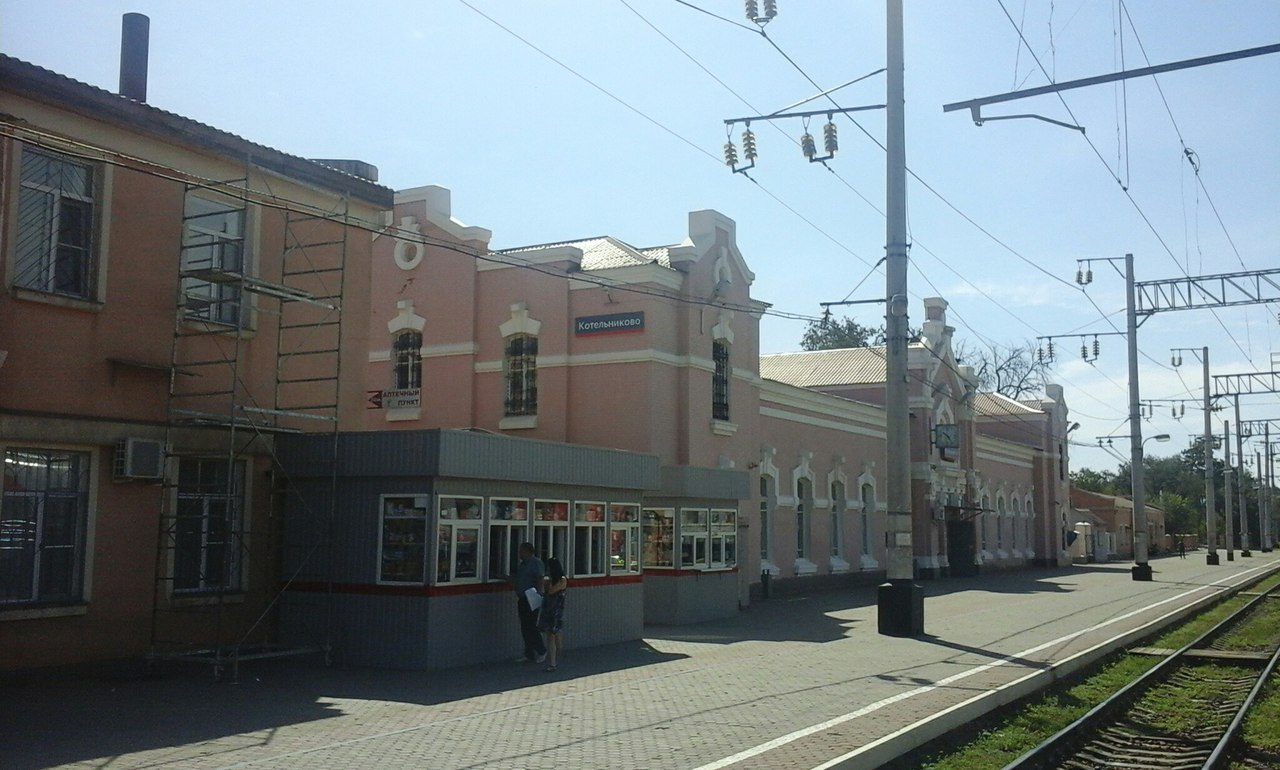
- Kotelnikovo railway station

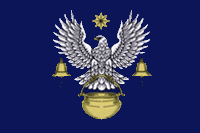
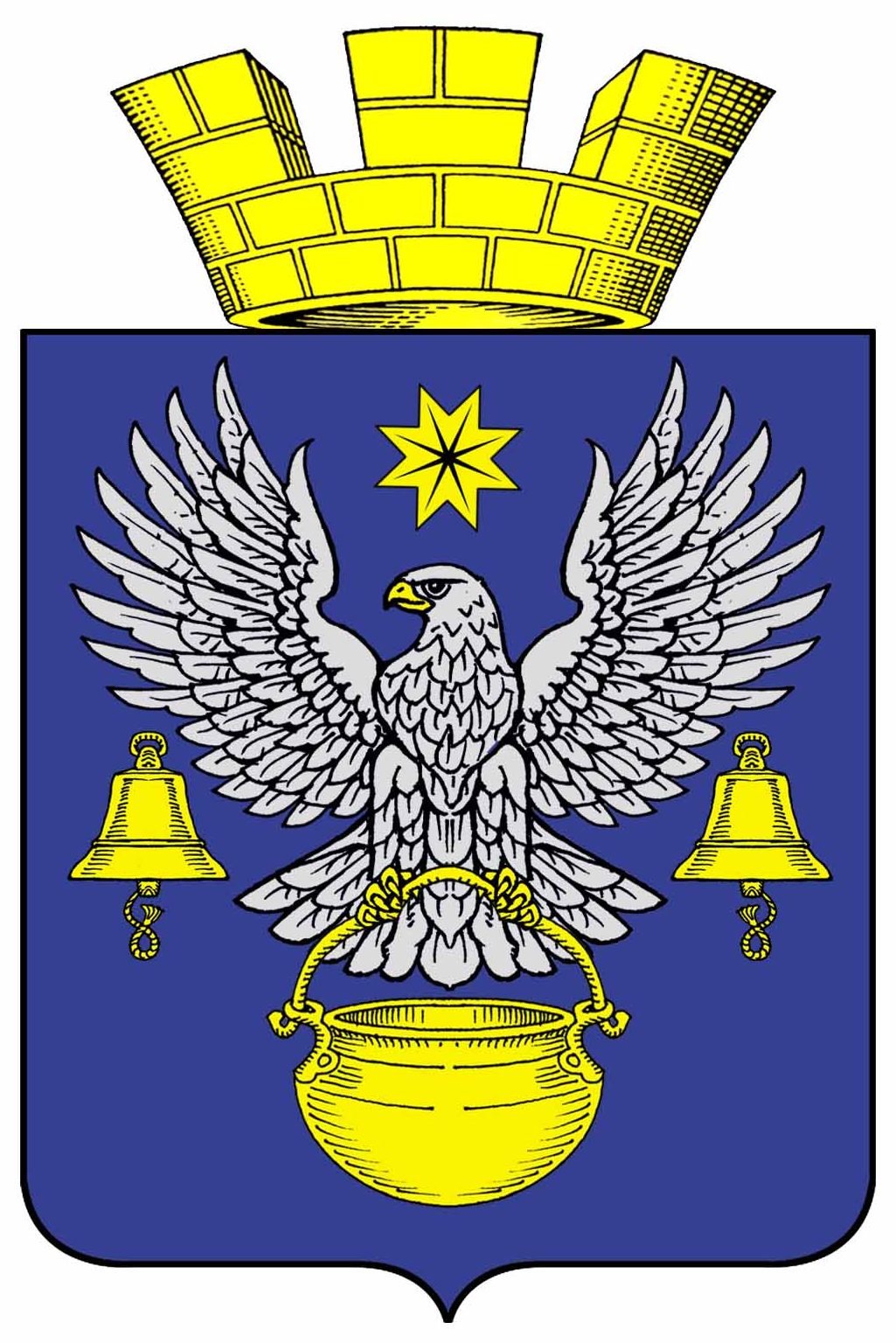
- Flag Coat of arms
- Interactive map of Kotelnikovo
- Location of Kotelnikovo Kotelnikovo (Volgograd Oblast)
- Coordinates: 47°38′N 43°09′E
- Country: Russia
- Federal subject: Volgograd Oblast
- Administrative district: Kotelnikovsky District
- Town of district significanceSelsoviet: Kotelnikovo
- Founded: 1897
- Town status since: 1955
- Elevation: 50 m (160 ft)

Population (2010 Census)
  - Total: 20,428
  - Estimate (2021): 22,016 (+7.8%)

Administrative status
  - Capital of: Kotelnikovsky District, town of district significance of Kotelnikovo

Municipal status
  - Municipal district: Kotelnikovsky Municipal District
  - Urban settlement: Kotelnikovskoye Urban Settlement
  - Capital of: Kotelnikovsky Municipal District, Kotelnikovskoye Urban Settlement
- Time zone: UTC+3 (MSK)
- Postal code: 238542
- OKTMO ID: 18624101001

Kotelnikovo (Russian: Коте́льниково) is a town and the administrative center of Kotelnikovsky District in Volgograd Oblast, Russia, located on the Kurmoyarsky Aksay River (which flows into the Tsimlyansk Reservoir), 190 kilometers (120 mi) southwest of Volgograd, the administrative center of the oblast. Population: 20,428 (2010 census); 19,656 (2002 census); 20,328 (1989 Soviet census).

== History ==
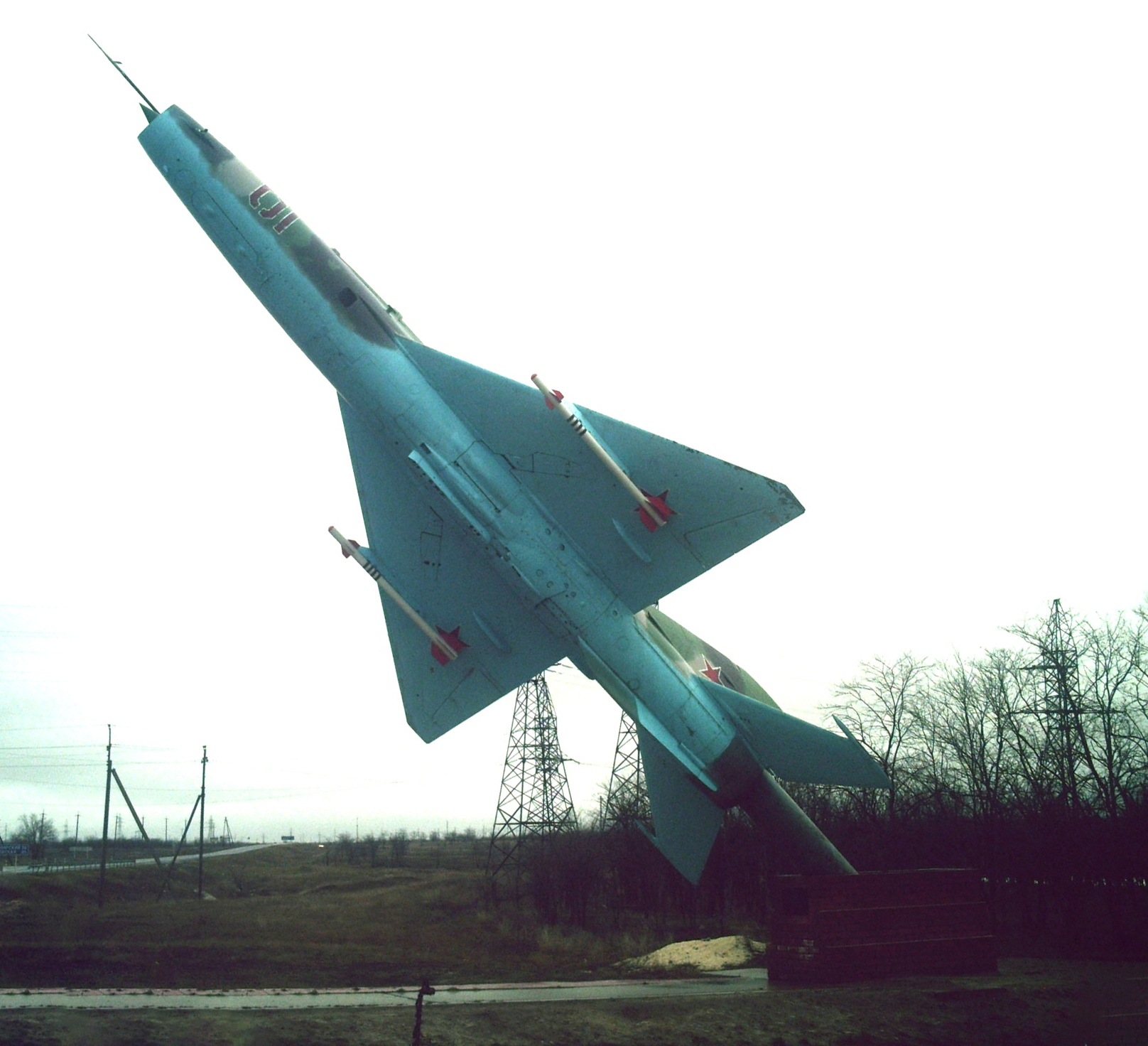
Monument to the Battle of Stalingrad

It was founded in 1897 as a settlement servicing the construction of a railway station of the same name (opened 1899). During World War II, it served as a base for the German troops of Field Marshal Erich von Manstein during the Battle of Stalingrad. A Soviet counteroffensive liberated Kotelnikovo on December 29, 1942. It was granted town status in 1955.

Kotelnikovo (air base), a Russian Air Force airbase is located nearby.

== Administrative and municipal status ==
Within the framework of administrative divisions, Kotelnikovo serves as the administrative center of Kotelnikovsky District. As an administrative division, it is incorporated within Kotelnikovsky District as the town of district significance of Kotelnikovo. As a municipal division, the town of district significance of Kotelnikovo is incorporated within Kotelnikovsky Municipal District as Kotelnikovskoye Urban Settlement.
