= Kotelnikovsky District =

Kotelnikovsky District Котельниковский район (Russian)
- District
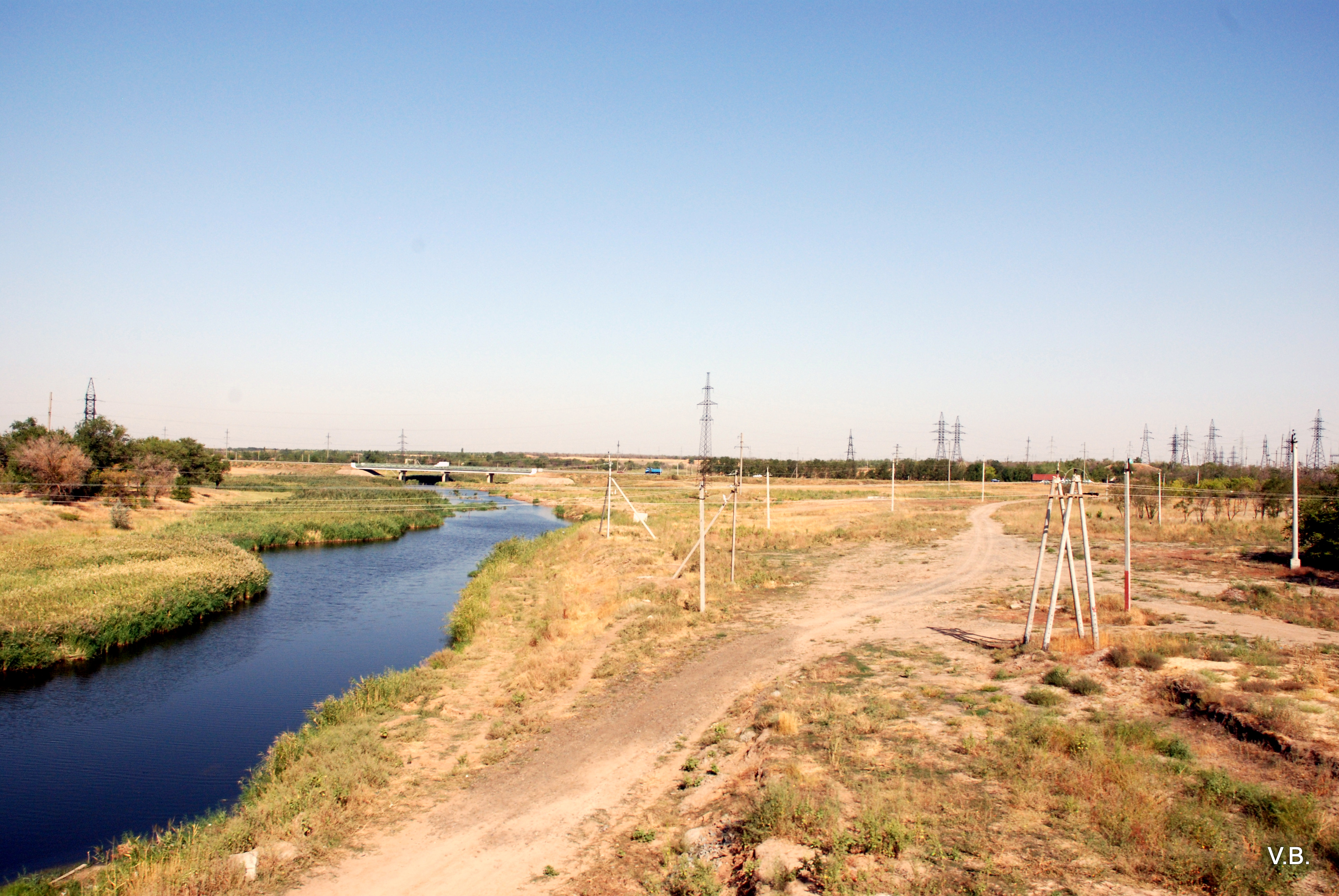
- River in Kotelnikovsky District

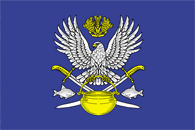
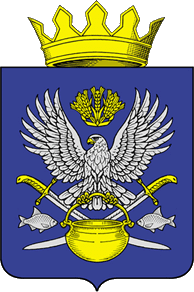
- Flag Coat of arms
- Location of Kotelnikovsky District in Volgograd Oblast
- Coordinates: 47°38′N 43°08′E
- Country: Russia
- Federal subject: Volgograd Oblast
- Established: 23 June 1928
- Administrative center: Kotelnikovo

Area
  - Total: 3,471 km^{2} (1,340 sq mi)

Population (2010 Census)
  - Total: 37,584
  - Density: 10.83/km^{2} (28.04/sq mi)
  - Urban: 54.4%
  - Rural: 45.6%

Administrative structure
  - Administrative divisions: 1 Towns of district significance, 15 Selsoviets
  - Inhabited localities: 1 cities/towns, 33 rural localities

Municipal structure
  - Municipally incorporated as: Kotelnikovsky Municipal District
  - Municipal divisions: 1 urban settlements, 15 rural settlements
- Time zone: UTC+3 (MSK)
- OKTMO ID: 18624000
- Website: http://www.kotelnikovo-region.ru/

Kotelnikovsky District (Russian: Коте́льниковский райо́н) is an administrative district (raion), one of the thirty-three in Volgograd Oblast, Russia. As a municipal division, it is incorporated as Kotelnikovsky Municipal District. It is located in the south of the oblast. The area of the district is 3,471 square kilometers (1,340 sq mi). Its administrative center is the town of Kotelnikovo. Population: 37,584 (2010 census); 36,856 (2002 Census); 38,660 (1989 Soviet census). The population of Kotelnikovo accounts for 54.4% of the district's total population.

== Notable people ==
- Vasily Generalov (1867-1887) a Russian revolutionary
- Germogen (Maximov) (1861-1945) head of the Croatian Orthodox Church, 1942–1945.
- Yemelyan Pugachev (ca.1742–1775) an ataman of the Yaik Cossacks and disaffected ex-lieutenant of the Imperial Russian Army who led Pugachev's Rebellion in 1773–75.
- Alina Stremous (born 1995) a Russian-born Moldovan biathlete who competed at the 2022 Winter Olympics
