= Oktyabrsky District, Russia =

Oktyabrsky District is the name of several administrative and municipal divisions in Russia. The districts are generally named for the October Revolution of 1917.

== Districts of the federal subjects ==
Federal subjects of Russia which have an entity called Oktyabrsky District

- Oktyabrsky District, Amur Oblast, an administrative and municipal district of Amur Oblast
- Oktyabrsky District, Chelyabinsk Oblast, an administrative and municipal district of Chelyabinsk Oblast
- Oktyabrsky District, Jewish Autonomous Oblast, an administrative and municipal district of the Jewish Autonomous Oblast
- Oktyabrsky District, Republic of Kalmykia, an administrative and municipal district of the Republic of Kalmykia
- Oktyabrsky District, Khanty-Mansi Autonomous Okrug, an administrative and municipal district of Khanty–Mansi Autonomous Okrug
- Oktyabrsky District, Kostroma Oblast, an administrative and municipal district of Kostroma Oblast
- Oktyabrsky District, Kursk Oblast, an administrative and municipal district of Kursk Oblast
- Oktyabrsky District, Orenburg Oblast, an administrative and municipal district of Orenburg Oblast
- Oktyabrsky District, Perm Krai, an administrative and municipal district of Perm Krai
- Oktyabrsky District, Primorsky Krai, an administrative and municipal district of Primorsky Krai
- Oktyabrsky District, Rostov Oblast, an administrative and municipal district of Rostov Oblast
- Oktyabrsky District, Volgograd Oblast, an administrative and municipal district of Volgograd Oblast

== City divisions ==
1. Oktyabrsky Territorial Okrug, Arkhangelsk, a territorial okrug of the city of Arkhangelsk, the administrative center of Arkhangelsk Oblast
2. Oktyabrsky City District, Barnaul, a city district of Barnaul, the administrative center of Altai Krai
3. Oktyabrsky City District, Grozny, a city district of Grozny, the capital of the Chechen Republic
4. Oktyabrsky City District, Irkutsk, a city district of Irkutsk, the administrative center of Irkutsk Oblast
5. Oktyabrsky City District, Ivanovo, a city district of Ivanovo, the administrative center of Ivanovo Oblast
6. Oktyabrsky City District, Izhevsk, a city district of Izhevsk, the capital of the Udmurt Republic
7. Oktyabrsky Okrug, Kaluga, an okrug of the city of Kaluga, the administrative center of Kaluga Oblast
8. Oktyabrsky City District, Kirov, a city district of Kirov, the administrative center of Kirov Oblast
9. Oktyabrsky City District, Krasnoyarsk, a city district of Krasnoyarsk, the administrative center of Krasnoyarsk Krai
10. Oktyabrsky Territorial Okrug, Lipetsk, a territorial okrug of the city of Lipetsk, the administrative center of Lipetsk Oblast
11. Oktyabrsky Administrative Okrug, Murmansk, an administrative okrug of the city of Murmansk, the administrative center of Murmansk Oblast
12. Oktyabrsky City District, Novosibirsk, a city district of Novosibirsk, the administrative center of Novosibirsk Oblast
13. Oktyabrsky Administrative Okrug, Omsk, an administrative okrug of the city of Omsk, the administrative center of Omsk Oblast
14. Oktyabrsky City District, Orsk, a city district of Orsk, a city in Orenburg Oblast
15. Oktyabrsky City District, Penza, a city district of Penza, the administrative center of Penza Oblast
16. Oktyabrsky City District, Rostov-on-Don, a city district of Rostov-on-Don, the administrative center of Rostov Oblast
17. Oktyabrsky City District, Ryazan, a city district of Ryazan, the administrative center of Ryazan Oblast
18. Oktyabrsky City District, Samara, an administrative and municipal city district of Samara, the administrative center of Samara Oblast
19. Oktyabrsky City District, Saransk, a city district of Saransk, the capital of the Republic of Mordovia
20. Oktyabrsky City District, Saratov, a city district of Saratov, the administrative center of Saratov Oblast
21. Oktyabrsky City District, Stavropol, a city district of Stavropol, the administrative center of Stavropol Krai
22. Oktyabrsky City District, Tambov, a city district of Tambov, the administrative center of Tambov Oblast
23. Oktyabrsky City District, Tomsk, a city district of Tomsk, the administrative center of Tomsk Oblast
24. Oktyabrsky City District, Ufa, a city district of Ufa, the capital of the Republic of Bashkortostan
25. Oktyabrsky City District, Ulan-Ude, a city district of Ulan-Ude, the capital of the Republic of Buryatia
26. Oktyabrsky City District, Vladimir, a city district of Vladimir, the administrative center of Vladimir Oblast
27. Oktyabrsky City District, Yekaterinburg, a city district of Yekaterinburg, the administrative center of Sverdlovsk Oblast
Cities in Russia with a city division called "Oktyabrsky"

== Renamed districts ==
- Oktyabrsky District, name of Takhtamukaysky District of the Republic of Adygea, Russia, until 1990
- Oktyabrsky District, name of Nurlatsky District of the Republic of Tatarstan, Russia, until 1997

== Historical districts ==
- Oktyabrsky District, Kalinin Oblast, a former district in Leningrad, Western, Kalinin, and Velikiye Luki Oblasts, merged into Zapadnodvinsky District in 1963.
- Oktyabrsky District, Saint Petersburg, a district of the federal city of St. Petersburg; merged into the newly established Admiralteysky District in March 1994

== Historical city districts ==
- Oktyabrsky Administrative District, a city district of Kaliningrad, the administrative center of Kaliningrad Oblast; merged into Tsentralny Administrative District in 2009

== See also ==
- Oktyabrsky (disambiguation)
- Oktyabrsky Okrug (disambiguation)
