= Oktyabrsky Urban Settlement =

Oktyabrsky Urban Settlement or Oktyabrskoye Urban Settlement is the name of several municipal formations in Russia.

== Modern urban settlements ==
- Oktyabrsky Urban Settlement, a municipal formation which the settlement of Oktyabrsky in Belgorodsky District of Belgorod Oblast is incorporated as
- Oktyabrsky Urban Settlement, a municipal formation which the work settlement of Oktyabrsky in Vaninsky District of Khabarovsk Krai is incorporated as
- Oktyabrsky Urban Settlement, a municipal formation which the Work Settlement of Oktyabrsky in Lyuberetsky District of Moscow Oblast is incorporated as
- Oktyabrsky Urban Settlement, a municipal formation which the Urban-Type Settlement of Oktyabrsky in Oktyabrsky District of Volgograd Oblast is incorporated as
- Oktyabrskoye Urban Settlement, Arkhangelsk Oblast, a municipal formation which Oktyabrsky Urban-Type Settlement with Jurisdictional Territory and Chadromsky Selsoviet in Ustyansky District of Arkhangelsk Oblast are incorporated as
- Oktyabrskoye Urban Settlement, a municipal formation which the work settlement of Oktyabrsky and the settlement of Khonyaki in Chunsky District of Irkutsk Oblast are incorporated as
- Oktyabrskoye Urban Settlement, a municipal formation which the settlement of Oktyabrsky in Ust-Bolsheretsky District of Kamchatka Krai is incorporated as
- Oktyabrskoye Urban Settlement, a municipal formation which the urban-type settlement of Oktyabrskoye and two rural localities in Oktyabrsky District of Khanty–Mansi Autonomous Okrug are incorporated as
- Oktyabrskoye Urban Settlement, a municipal formation which the work settlement of Oktyabrsky and seven rural localities in Oktyabrsky District of Perm Krai are incorporated as
- Oktyabrskoye Urban Settlement, a municipal formation which the Work Settlement of Oktyabrsky in Mikhaylovsky District of Ryazan Oblast is incorporated as

== Historical urban settlements ==
- Oktyabrskoye Urban Settlement, a former municipal formation which the then-work settlement of Oktyabrsky and two rural localities in Cherdaklinsky District of Ulyanovsk Oblast were incorporated as before being demoted in status to that of a rural settlement effective January 2009

== See also ==
- Oktyabrsky (disambiguation)
