= 98th Rifle Division =

98th Rifle Division (January 1939 - September 26, 1941) 98th Rifle Division (January 30, 1942 - April 16, 1943) 98th Rifle Division (April 28, 1943 - July 1945)
- Active: 1939-1945
- Country: Soviet Union
- Type: Infantry
- Size: Division
- Engagements: Operation Barbarossa; Battle of Smolensk (1941); Battle of Stalingrad; Operation Winter Storm; Tormosin Offensive; Rostov Offensive Operation; Siege of Leningrad; Leningrad–Novgorod offensive Krasnoye Selo–Ropsha offensive Battle of Narva (1944); Baltic offensive Tartu offensive Riga offensive (1944); Courland Pocket; Upper Silesian offensive Prague offensive
- Decorations: Order of the Red Banner (3rd Formation)
- Battle honours: Ropsha (3rd Formation)

Commanders
- Notable commanders: Col. Ivan Mikhailovich Antyufeev; Maj. Gen. Akim Markovich Markov; Maj. Gen. Mikhail Filippovich Gavrilov; Maj. Gen. Yosif Fyodorovich Barinov; Col. Ivan Fedotovich Seryogin; Col. Nikolai Sergeevich Nikanorov

The first 98th Rifle Division was formed in the Ural Military District in January, 1939, based on the shtat (table of organization and equipment) that would become official the following September. It began moving west from the Urals just prior to the German invasion, assigned to the 22nd Army of the High Command reserve, and completed its arrival in the Polotsk area on June 20. Within a week it was fighting to hold along the Daugava River in Belarus, but failed to drive off a crossing effort east of Dzisna, which created a bridgehead for the 3rd Panzer Group. Despite repeated counterattacks the German forces were able to break out on July 11, and the 98th soon found itself encircled along with most of the rest of its Army. In the third week of July what remained of the division broke out near Nevel and was sent to the Army reserves where it was partially rebuilt. In the third week of August a renewed German offensive toward Toropets smashed through the division and encircled or scattered its survivors again, with only several hundred escaping. With no resources available to rebuild it again the 98th was disbanded on September 26.

A rifle division originally called the Spasskaya was formed in October 1941 in the 1st Red Banner Army of Far Eastern Front, largely for border defense duties. On January 30, 1942, it was officially redesignated as the 2nd formation of the 98th, but remained in the far east on the same duties until July when it was sent east toward Stalingrad. Assigned to Stalingrad Front's 62nd Army it took up positions along the east bank of the Don River in mid-August as a full strength unit and immediately joined in battles to prevent German 6th Army from establishing a bridgehead but after putting up a creditable fight for over a week was overrun and devastated by the panzer breakout on August 23. Its remnants fell back to the city but in September these were pulled back to 1st Reserve Army for a complete rebuilding. This took place in Tambov Oblast, and in November 1st Reserve was redesignated as 2nd Guards Army. After the encirclement of 6th Army the 2nd Guards was moved to block the German relief attempt by Army Group Don. Once this effort collapsed in December the 98th joined its Army, now in Southern Front, in forcing the withdrawal of Army Group Don along both banks of its namesake river in an attempt to reach Rostov-on-Don to cut off Army Group A in the Caucasus. This offensive through February 1943 made gradual progress across the frozen steppe in the face of numerous counterstrikes. Just before Rostov finally fell on February 14 the division played a leading role in the liberation of Novocherkassk before advancing to the Mius River over the next two weeks. This was a heavily fortified German line from the previous winter and the Soviet advance was forced to a halt. In March the 98th was removed to the rear for rebuilding, and on April 16 it was redesignated as the 86th Guards Rifle Division.

The final 98th Rifle Division was formed on the basis of a pair of rifle brigades in Leningrad Front on April 28, 1943. For most of the remainder of the year it served in the Oranienbaum Bridgehead west of Leningrad in the Coastal Operational Group, which was redesignated as 2nd Shock Army just prior to the winter offensive that drove Army Group North away from the city. Shortly after the start of the start of the offensive the division took part in the liberation of Ropsha and won its name as an honorific. In early February it was further rewarded with the Order of the Red Banner. At the beginning of March the 98th forced a crossing of the Narva River north of the city of that name, but the campaign became bogged down until July. During the Baltic offensives it advanced through Estonia under command of 3rd Baltic Front's 67th Army toward the Gulf of Riga, and when that Front was disbanded in October the division was reassigned to 1st Shock Army in 2nd Baltic Front. This Front by now was largely concerned with confining the German forces in the Courland Pocket, a strategic backwater, and the 98th was moved well to the south in February 1945 to join the 59th Army in 1st Ukrainian Front for the final offensives in Silesia and Czechoslovakia. It would be disbanded in the summer of 1945.

== 1st Formation ==
The division began forming in January 1939 at Ufa in the Ural Military District, based on the 253rd Rifle Regiment of the 85th Rifle Division. In November the division came under command of Col. Ivan Mikhailovich Antyufeev, and he remained in this position for a year, during which time his headquarters moved to Izhevsk. In December 1940 he was demoted to deputy command of the 95th Rifle Division, and Maj. Gen. Akim Markovich Markov took over the 98th. This officer had briefly served as deputy chief of staff of the Ural District for organizational and mobilization issues, and when the 51st Rifle Corps was formed in March 1941 he was given command, with the 98th as one of its divisions. Maj. Gen. Mikhail Filippovich Gavrilov, who had previously led the 83rd Mountain Rifle and the 182nd Rifle Divisions before becoming chief of the Novosibirsk Military Infantry School, took over the division. By the beginning of June the 51st Corps had the 98th, 112th, and 153rd Rifle Divisions under command. The first two had the 6,000-man establishment, while the latter was on the 3,000-man establishment; Markov noted that all three had "incurred significant personnel expenditures on internal and garrison service, which reduced their overall combat readiness." In order to complete to wartime strength the 98th and 112th received 6,000 reservists each, while the 153rd got 8,000, but many did not arrive until the Corps was already in battle. The Corps was assigned to 22nd Army, which in early July would come under Western Front.

On June 22 the 98th's order of battle was as follows:

- 4th Rifle Regiment
- 166th Rifle Regiment
- 308th Rifle Regiment
- 153rd Artillery Regiment
- 155th Howitzer Artillery Regiment
- 157th Antitank Battalion
- 285th Antiaircraft Battalion
- 76th Reconnaissance Battalion
- 84th Sapper Battalion
- 108th Signal Battalion
- 50th Medical/Sanitation Battalion
- 60th Motor Transport Company
- 785th Field Postal Station (later 480th)
- 229th Field Office of the State Bank

As the division unloaded at Dretun the Army commander, Lt. Gen. F. A. Yershakov, ordered his troops to take up planned positions on a defensive line along the right bank of the Daugava River from Krāslava to Drissa to Polotsk to Vitebsk, with the intention of preventing German forces from crossing the river. 51st Corps occupied the western end of this line.

== Battle of Smolensk ==
On June 26 commandos of the Brandenburgers captured the two bridges over the Daugava at Daugavpils, permitting a crossing by the LVI Motorized Corps' 8th Panzer Division. This bridgehead was quickly expanded in order to attack the 112th at Krāslava, but that division put up firm resistance. 4th Panzer Group now sought alternative crossing points, including at Drissa and Ustye. General Gavrilov noticed the German concentration and moved his advanced forces back to the right bank before ordering the bridges blown but his sappers rushed the job and some men were cut off on the left bank. The German crossing attempts were stopped.

=== Battle for the Daugava ===
Overnight on July 2/3 the advance detachment of LVII Motorized Corps' 19th Panzer Division began an advance along the Sharkawshchyna–Dzisna road toward the Daugava, also searching for a crossing point. Dzisna fell in the morning but initial efforts to cross failed, largely due to effective artillery fire. During July 3/4 the panzer troops pushed east of Dzisna and put an assault group over to the right bank in inflatable boats. In the morning, with air support in place, a second wave began crossing. This area was defended by the 166th Rifle Regiment, which managed to hold against the first attack, but by 0830 hours three companies were in the bridgehead, which launched an attack that captured the village of Lunacharskoye. The inexperienced men of the 166th left their trenches and retreated. This failure was unexpected and placed both Markov and Yershakov in a dilemma, as neither 51st Corps nor 22nd Army had any reserves available. Yershakov's chief of staff, Maj. Gen. G. F. Zakharov, was forced to report to the headquarters of the new commander of Western Front, Marshal S. K. Timoshenko, as follows: "The enemy launched an infantry offensive east of Disna with up to a divisional strength, and by 12:00, he had managed to cross the river with a force of about two battalions. The results are still unknown, as communications have been disrupted." Zakharov requested a tank regiment and two squadrons of fighter planes, but no tanks were available.

German infantry continued to cross to the bridgehead, which soon expanded to a depth of 2-3km, including several commanding heights. At 1800 hours Gavrilov counterattacked with the forces he had on hand, backed by air attacks. 19th Panzer reported this was repelled with heavy Soviet losses. The German command now planned to cross another infantry regiment while also building a pontoon bridge. Any breakout from the bridgehead would threaten the supply lines of the 112th as well as the entire Corps along the Polotsk–Drissa highway and railroad. However, prisoner information now made clear to the commander of 19th Panzer, Lt. Gen. O. von Knobelsdorff, that he was facing a full division and not simply bits and pieces of defeated and retreating units. He therefore ordered his division over to the defense in order to consolidate and build up strength. Bridge building was suspended as the 98th's artillery fire remained effective.

Consternation over the German bridgehead caused the deputy commander of Western Front, Lt. Gen. A. I. Yeryomenko, to visit the 51st Corps sector on July 5. The commander of the 166th Regiment, Maj. K. A. Zainullin, was executed in front of his men. General Markov was heavily reprimanded for his failure to take effective countermeasures. Yeryomenko also intervened to halt the retreat of the 126th Rifle Division (11th Army, Northwestern Front) and put its remaining 2,400 men into line to the left of the 98th. Another counterattack by the 166th, now supported by elements of the 4th Rifle Regiment, was organized. This also failed and the 98th was forced to fall back on its left flank to a prepared line near Borkovichy station, currently held by the 110th Howitzer Artillery Regiment, which had lost all its guns in the retreat from Lithuania.

On the same morning the German command began reinforcing the bridgehead with elements of 14th Motorized Division and a regiment of 18th Motorized Division that had been fighting near Polotsk. The day saw back and forth fighting for Borkovichy, which ended in German hands. Early on July 6, following an artillery preparation, the 98th and 126th, backed by reinforced regiments of the 112th and 174th Rifle Divisions, resumed their attacks on the bridgehead, but these made little progress. By evening von Knobelsdorff had reported that the counterattacks and air attacks had made it impossible to take the village of Bokachi. He further reported that an attack directly toward Polotsk would have to face "a deep zone of field fortifications and pillboxes," the remnants of the Stalin Line. By evening German sappers had begun to place a second pontoon bridge.

During July 7 both sides were attacking simultaneously to expand or eliminate the bridgehead. 19th Panzer was engaging the left flank of the and the regiment of the 174th within the Polotsk fortifications, while the 14th and 18th Motorized struck to the west and northwest against the remainder of the 98th. Meanwhile, the four rifle divisions made a vigorous and coordinated attack; the 4th and 166th Regiments and the 385th Rifle Regiment of the 112th, now joined by the soldiers of the 110th Guards Aviation Regiment, pushed back against the German forces advancing from Borkovichy station. The commander of the 126th was mortally wounded in this fighting. The headquarters of LVII Motorized reported:

At 7:15, the 19th Panzer and 14th Motorized were engaged in a heavy defensive battle against the Russians, who were constantly attacking. The attacks were repelled at the cost of bloody losses on both sides, primarily in fierce close-quarters combat. On the southern flank of the 19th Panzer Division, where only weak forces were engaged, the enemy managed to approach to withing 3km of the bridge. The Russian artillery superiority was becoming increasingly strong.

The 19th Panzer finally went on the offensive toward Polotsk at 1000 hours, encountering the first line of fortifications at 1330. Meanwhile, 14th Motorized broke through to the railway from Borkovichy to Skorod stations by 1230. It then pushed to the northwest toward the village of Volyntsy and the Drissa River, threatening the 98th with encirclement. By the day's end the division was pushed back to the Drissa–Matulovo line.

On the morning of July 9 the 385th Regiment managed to drive 14th Motorized out of Borkovichy station while the entire bridgehead came under heavy Red Air Force attacks. The German command understood the importance of the station in keeping 51st Corps supplied, and on the afternoon of July 10 the 14th retook it. In this fighting the 385th lost up to half of its strength but enabled the 98th to retreat to a line from Volyntsy to Vladychino. A gap between it and the 174th was filled with the remaining men of the 126th. Now the 112th was threatened with encirclement and during July 10-11 it fell back under pressure across the Sarja River, east of Dzisna.

Timoshenko's headquarters sent an operational summary to the STAVKA at 2000 hours on July 11 in which the 98th was said to be continuing to hold against attempts to force the Drissa. Late on July 13 Timoshenko further reported that, while 22nd Army was defending the Idritsa area and the Polotsk Fortified Region, German pressure had forced the division back toward Pribytki. In his orders of July 14, Timoshenko directed Yershakov to "smooth out the front in the center by withdrawing 98th and 112th RDs to the Iukhovichi and Baravukha line, hold on to the Polotsk Fortified Region, attack toward Gorodok and Vitebsk to occupy and defend the Sirotino and Zuikovo front, and keep at least one RD in army reserve behind the left wing." This was an overly ambitious mission for divisions as hard-pressed as these.

These plans were completely preempted when LVII Motorized, with the cooperation of 9th Army's L and XXIII Army Corps, drove 22nd Army out of its remaining defenses along the Daugava northwest of Polotsk, cut it into two parts, and threatened both with encirclement. The German armored units bypassed Polotsk and pushed north toward Nevel. On July 16 Timoshenko ordered Yershakov to withdraw to new defenses, stating:

The situation on 22nd Army's front permits and requires the defeat and destruction of the enemy by stubborn fighting along successive lines during a withdrawal to Alushkovo, Lake Ozerishche, and Dubrovo...
2. Close the penetration that has formed between 98th and 112th RDs with all of the army's forces at hand.

The 3rd Panzer Group had already begun a two-pronged advance from Vitebsk and by July 15 had pushed well over 500 tanks to the northeast outskirts of Smolensk and to Nevel. This town had already been serving as a collecting point for stragglers from 27th Army and 51st Corps, and also guarded the approaches to Velikiye Luki, 50km further northeast. It fell to 19th Panzer on the morning of July 16. Four of Yershakov's divisions, including the 112th and 98th, were now threatened with encirclement west of Nevel, while the remaining four were isolated between there and Vitebsk.

=== First Battle of Velikiye Luki ===
LVII Motorized Corps was now ordered to capture Velikiye Luki. This was accomplished at nightfall on July 18 with an isolated thrust by 19th Panzer and 14th Motorized. Over the previous two days the 98th and 112th, along with 51st Corps headquarters, had been fighting rearguard actions toward Nevel, finally reaching the village of Repishche, 12km to its northeast. 12th Infantry Division, advancing northwest of Pustoshka, linked up with 19th Panzer and completed the encirclement. The commander of Army Group North believed, from the papers found on a captured courier, that a total of 13 divisions were trapped, but the OKH was less optimistic. The elimination of the two pockets would effectively dispose of any threat to the Army Group's right flank as it advanced on Leningrad.

14th Motorized was especially overextended and vulnerable to counterattack, and the escaping troops of 51st and 62nd Rifle Corps pressed against the light screen it had erected south of Nevel and 12th Infantry's blocking positions north of that place. On July 19 the STAVKA ordered 29th Army to begin preparing an attack from the Toropets area toward Velikiye Luki with three divisions. Overnight on July 19/20 this force overran a sector lightly held by 14th Motorized and broke into the clear. 19th Panzer sent a battlegroup to intercept but this ran into unexpectedly stiff resistance. It then abandoned the city itself. Inside the encirclement General Markov issued orders for a breakout overnight on July 20/21. The task was to penetrate the German line along the Leningrad Highway. The reinforced 308th Rifle Regiment was to take a section of the highway and then go on the defense facing southeast toward Nevel. However, the breakthrough failed because units were not sufficiently concentrated for the attack and Markov failed to establish a unified command post. The next day additional German forces were moved up to plug any gaps in the line. A further effort was made on July 21/22, with Markov insisting that all forces attack northeast toward Novosokolniki. However, the 98th moved along a different route, which led to traffic jams and gridlock in the darkness. Ultimately, Markov was forced to abandon a breakout by large units and ordered separate small detachments to filter through the German lines after heavy equipment and vehicles were destroyed.

Many of these detachments managed to make their escape over the following nights. One exception was the 3rd Battalion of the 4th Rifle Regiment, which remained organized behind German lines. On August 22 it joined a partisan detachment that had been organized by regimental commissar Ivan Petrovich Belyaev of the 112th. This detachment, eventually reaching the size of a brigade, finally reached the lines of 22nd Army near Nelidovo on October 12. Meanwhile, on July 21 General Yershakov had been ordered to tie down German forces with local attacks beginning the next day. On July 24, Timoshenko reported the liberation of Velikiye Luki, with the attackers taking up defensive positions along the Lovat River to the north and south. At 2000 on July 23 Yershakov effectively admitted that only remnants of 51st Corps had been able to break out; it had lost its headquarters as well as the bulk of the 98th and 112th Divisions. On July 26 the two divisions moved to the Dokuhino area, where they were absorbed by their Corps-mate, the 170th Rifle Division; only a cadre of the 98th was retained in reserve for rebuilding. On July 27 Yershakov reorganized his Army to defend along the Lovat through Velikiye Luki to Lake Dvina, which was 45km to the southeast. He was directed to hold the city "at all cost". German 9th Army now took up the front south of the city from LVII Motorized but made no immediate effort to retake it.

=== Second Battle of Velikiye Luki ===
Stalin approved a plan on August 15 by Timoshenko to renew the counteroffensive by Western Front, although the task allotted to 22nd Army was largely to continue to hold its positions. This began on August 17. Two days later Hitler and the OKH ordered Army Group Center to shift the bulk of 3rd Panzer Group to reinforce Army Group North's faltering drive toward Leningrad and also eliminate the perceived threat to Army Group Center's left flank. This set up a cat-and-mouse game between the two sides, with the German immediate objective of crushing 22nd Army and defeating 29th Army into the bargain.

By this time the 98th "had just been put in order." It was reported that 70 percent of its personnel were Siberian, from the year groups 1902-1922. It had no artillery, about 50 heavy machine guns, and had received about 5,000 replacements from the Volga Military District on August 19-20, giving it some sort of combat effectiveness. Currently under command of 29th Rifle Corps it had two regiments in Corps reserve behind the 179th Rifle Division, ready to exploit its success in the counteroffensive, while 4th Regiment was truck mobile and positioned near Ushitsy Sovkhoz acting as the Army's reserve.

Western Front first reported at 2000 hours on August 19 about the possibility of a German counterstroke on Velikiye Luki, but also stated that 22nd Army was fortifying its positions. A further report 48 hours later stated: "22nd Army - while defending on its right wing, attacked in its center and left wing at 1300 hours on 21 August to destroy the opposing enemy." Optimistic early reports showed Timoshenko's complete ignorance about the true situation, as by now the Army was fighting for its existence. This ignorance continued the next day, although significantly there was no mention of the 170th. Finally, on August 23 the news of Yershakov's actual position broke through the fog, forcing Timoshenko to alter his plans significantly. Noon reports described a German attack affecting most of the Army and at 1430 the neighboring 29th Army stated that "at least an enemy panzer division has penetrated toward Velikiye Luki from the west" and armored reconnaissance troops were in 22nd Army's rear. The 186th Rifle Division, plus most of the 98th which had been sent south to its aid, were smashed, and Yershakov lost communications with them. The 174th Division was forced to flee to the northeast.

Later on August 23 the 19th and 20th Panzer Divisions made a headlong assault on Velikiye Luki from the east, while the 110th, 102nd, and 256th Infantry Divisions attempted to liquidate the remnants of 62nd Corps while also pushing into the rear of 29th Army and the objective of Toropets. Yershakov was reported as using the 98th and 170th to "liquidate the enemy penetration and protect the northern axis," but this was largely fictional. What remained of 22nd Army, some 40,000 personnel, were now confined to a pocket 12-15km from north to south and 16-20km east to west. During August 24 these forces came under continuous air attack, while the 98th and 186th remained out of contact.

Yershakov issued his first breakout order at 1015 hours on August 24, calling for his forces to push eastward along and south of the Toropets–Velikiye Luki highway. Overnight, up to 20,000 men of the main body of 22nd Army (29th and 51st Corps) managed to escape the pocket around Velikiye Luki, while another 25,000 fought on until death or capture. The city was retaken on August 25.

==== Defense of Toropets ====
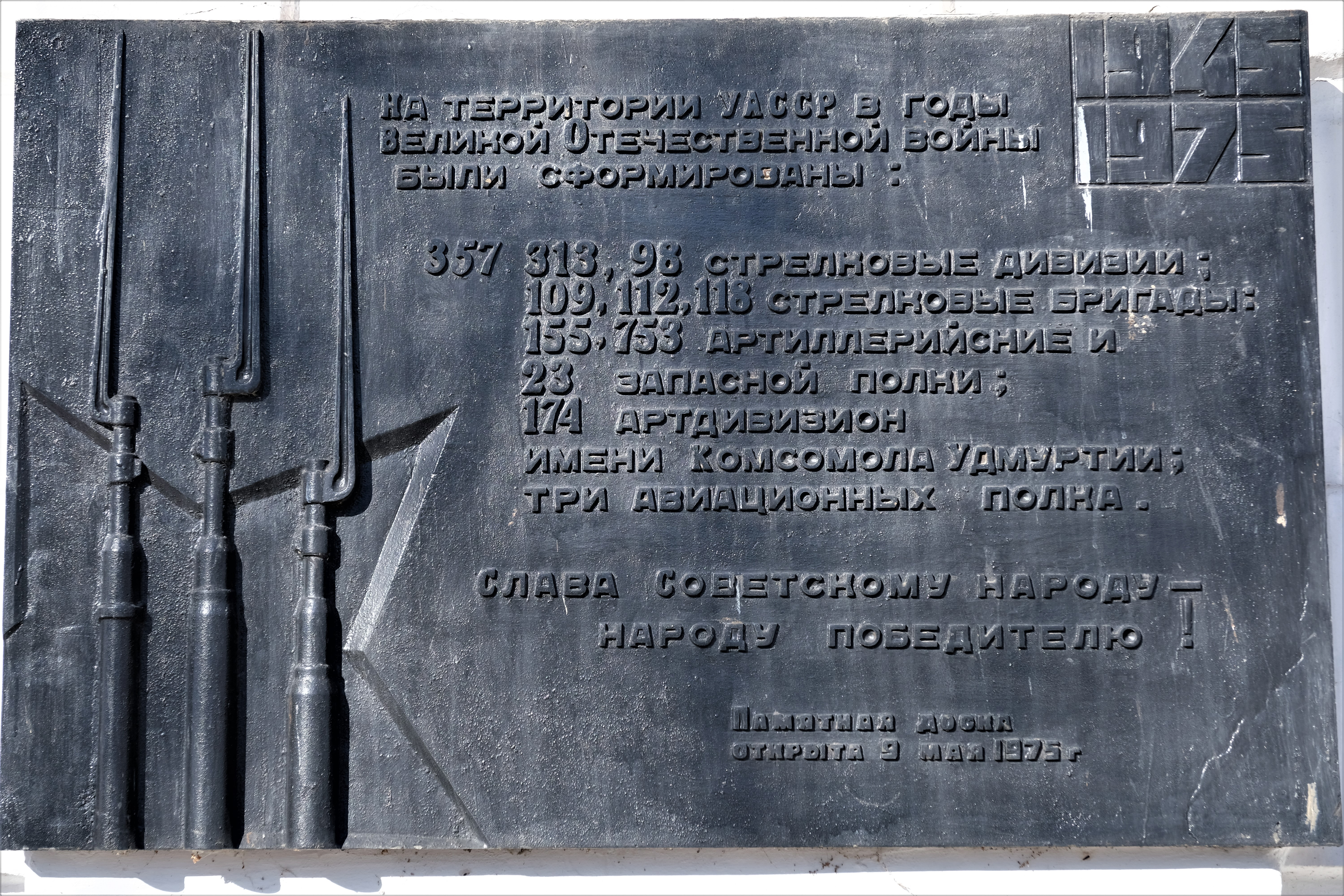
Monument in Izhevsk to the 98th, 313th, 357th Rifle Divisions and other Red Army units formed there

The now-deputy chief of staff of Western Front, Lt. Gen. G. K. Malandin, was sent to Yershakov's headquarters on August 26 to survey the situation as the survivors left the pocket. He reported back near midnight, in part, that the 98th, along with the 126th and 170th Divisions, "appeared in separate disorganized groups". Thus, although they had withdrawn, they were no longer combat-capable. He further stated that the division "has up to 300 men but no equipment and headquarters." Despite the state of its units the 22nd Army was ordered to "occupy and defend the Chernost' River, Pal'tsevo, Barsuki, Lake Kodosno, and Naumovo State Farm line by the night on 27 August..." At this time the 98th was still part of the Army reserve, concentrated in a wood 1km east of Zhizhitsa station, 32km southwest of Toropets. Late on August 28 the chief of staff of the Front, Lt. Gen. V. D. Sokolovskii, reported that "although 98th and 214th RDs are supposedly withdrawing north of 186th RD, we have no information about them." A scratch line of company- and battalion-size strong points was all that remained to defend Toropets, which fell on the morning of August 29. Under the circumstances there was no prospect of rebuilding the 98th again, and it was officially disbanded on September 26.

== 2nd Formation ==
Far Eastern Front formed a new rifle division in its 1st Army in October 1941 called Spasskaya, based on local resources and intended for border defense service. On January 30, 1942, under the orders of Army commander Lt. Gen. V. P. Vasilev, the division was redesignated as the new 98th. The division remained under command of Col. Yosif Fyodorovich Barinov, who had led the Spasskaya since November 4. This officer had been chief of staff of the 3rd Division of Collective Farms (Kolkhoz) when he was arrested in July 1938 during the Great Purge. When released in December 1939 he was placed at the disposal of the 2nd Red Banner Army before becoming assistant commandant of the Khabarovsk Infantry School, rising to the post of commandant before taking command of the division. Once redesignated its order of battle was very similar to that of the 1st formation:

- 4th Rifle Regiment
- 166th Rifle Regiment
- 308th Rifle Regiment
- 153rd Artillery Regiment
- 157th Antitank Battalion
- 214th Antiaircraft Battery
- 263rd Machine Gun Battalion (until February 5, 1943)
- 76th Reconnaissance Company
- 80th Sapper Battalion
- 324th Signal Company
- 50th Medical/Sanitation Battalion
- 109th Chemical Defense (Anti-gas) Platoon
- 6th Motor Transport Company
- 277th Field Bakery
- 990th Divisional Veterinary Hospital
- 1727th Field Postal Station (later 480th)
- 1119th Field Office of the State Bank

The 98th remained in its border role until July when it was moved to the Reserve of the Supreme High Command and began moving west along the Trans-Siberian Railway toward Stalingrad, which was threatened by the German summer offensive, Case Blue. It was intended to be assigned to Southwestern Front, but by the time it arrived in early August this had been redesignated as Stalingrad Front, and the division became part of its 62nd Army. The Battle of Kalach west of the Don River had ended on August 11, and the German 6th Army was now poised to strike across the Don toward Stalingrad. On August 4 Barinov had been promoted to major general.

== Defense of Stalingrad ==
The Front was under command of Col. Gen. A. I. Yeryomenko, with Lt. Gen. V. N. Gordov as his deputy, while 62nd Army was led by Lt. Gen. A. I. Lopatin. After consulting with chief of the general staff Col. Gen. A. M. Vasilevskii during August 9-12 Yeryomenko decided to organize the Front's defenses on a sector of the east bank of the Don from Kalach through Kletskaya as far north as Babka. Lopatin had three divisions on this side of the river, with six more still encircled on the west bank. He was ordered to, among other measures:

Create a dense tactical defense with the 98th Rifle Division in the Peskovatka, Sokarevka, and Illarionovskii sector [32-15km north of Kalach] and with the 87th Rifle Division in the Illarionovskii, Sovetskii, and Sredne-Tsaritsynskii sector [20-25km south of Kalach], both divisions in the front's reserve.

The Army was to be allotted 5,000 antitank and anti-personnel mines for the defense. While the defense plan appeared sound on paper, there were several important flaws. The 1st Guards Army was intended to cover an important sector, but it was late arriving. As well, Yeryomenko's assumption that Lopatin's encircled divisions would be able to escape across the Don proved wrong; 62nd Army did not have the strength to launch a viable relief effort so only scattered individuals and small groups got across on their own initiative. Finally, Gen. F. Paulus, commander of 6th Army, was determined to attack before the defense could gel.

During August 15-19 Paulus mounted an operation with 11 divisions to clear the northeast corner of the great bend of the Don that was being held by 4th Tank Army. With this completed and 4th Tank's remnants swept to the east bank Lopatin was ordered to move the 98th plus one regiment of the 87th northwest to the vicinity of Vertyachy and Peskovatka. Gordov concentrated the 214th Rifle Division and the remainder of the 87th in the areas of Kotluban and Samofalovka, 20km east of Vertiachy, to act as Stalingrad Front's new reserve. As of August 15 the 98th had 11,689 personnel on strength.

While this was going on the 534th and 535th Regiments of VIII Army Corps' 384th Infantry Division stormed across the Don at Akatov and seized a bridgehead on the east bank. In what one German war correspondent described as "one of the most senseless actions of the war," for eight days this division, reinforced overnight on August 17/18 by elements of 389th Infantry Division, fought a vicious battle with the 98th, 214th, and 39th Guards Rifle Divisions, supported by the 193rd Tank and 22nd Motorized Rifle Brigades and 468th Antitank Regiment. By the time the fighting ended the two German divisions had suffered more than 300 dead, only to see the Army commander abandon part of the bridgehead and conduct his main attack on Stalingrad at Vertyachy.

On August 21 the 6th Army began its drive to the Volga and Stalingrad. The assault was led by the 178th and 203rd Regiments of 76th Infantry Division plus the 516th and 517th Regiments of 295th Infantry Division, all part of the LI Army Corps. According to the German correspondent:

The night before the attack was clear and starry, the wind blew from the south-east, and a light mist lay over the Don. For reasons of visibility and the facilitate the clearing of the enemy's minefields, zero hour had been fixed for 0310 hours... One hour and fifty minutes later, all the combat troops of 516th Infantry Regiment were in position on the eastern bank; 517th Infantry Regiment met with strong enemy resistance and needed four hours and twenth minutes to get across.
Matters did not go so smoothly with 76th Infantry Division; 178th Infantry Regiment did indeed establish its allotted bridgehead at Akimovskii relatively quickly, but 203rd Regiment met desperate resistance.
The northerly crossing of the Don was made by Sixth Army at the cost of seventy-four dead and three hundred fifty-one wounded. Nineteen assault craft and twenty-six kapok rafts were shot to pieces.

The Red Army General Staff's report on the morning of the next day stated in part, "98th RD was fighting along the Verkhne-Gnilovskii–Vertiachii line." The report on August 23 noted that the division, along with the 40th Tank Brigade, were fighting "with an enemy force of up to an infantry regiment in the region north of Vertiachii." That day the floodgates opened and while the combat-effective elements of 4th Tank Army continued attacking at Akatov the main forces of XIV Panzer Corps rolled east and reached the Volga before nightfall. 62nd Army could only cling to the south flank of the panzer corridor from north of Kalach to the northwestern approaches to the city; in three days of battle the 98th had been "shattered".

By September 3 only 62nd Army and less than half of 64th Army, along with various militia and NKVD units, were defending the approaches to Stalingrad itself. The remnants of the 98th were incorporated into the 2nd Tank Corps, which was directed to take up prepared positions to defend the line through Hills 135.4, 144.2, 147.6, and 143.6 to prevent a German breakthrough to the south and southeast. On the same day General Barinov was relieved of command due to the excessive losses the division had suffered and was replaced by Col. Ivan Fedotovich Seryogin. Barinov was soon placed in command of the 233rd Rifle Division, which he led until February 5, 1943, and later became deputy commander of the 65th Army. Seryogin had previously commanded the 299th and 18th Rifle Divisions.

=== Into reserve ===
In a September 11 report the strength of the 98th was given as 465 men, of which some 300 were "bayonets" (riflemen and sappers), among the lowest of the divisions in 62nd Army. Under the circumstances it was of little value to the defense of Stalingrad, so what remained was moved across the Volga, loaded on trains, and moved north to the Tambov Oblast, where it was assigned to 1st Reserve Army. In October it came under 1st Guards Rifle Corps in this Army, which in November was renamed as 2nd Guards Army and was intended to be combat-ready by November 25. The 98th would remain under these commands for the duration of the 2nd formation. 1st Guards Corps also contained the 24th and 33rd Guards Rifle Divisions, the latter of which had also suffered heavily in the fighting along the Don. The Army remained in the Tambov area through the remainder of November as the STAVKA debated its future employment.

=== Operation Winter Storm ===
Operation Uranus, the Soviet offensive to encircle the German forces at Stalingrad, began on November 19, and the encirclement was completed on November 23. In response the German High Command formed Army Group Don with the goal of relieving the trapped armies. Operation Winter Storm was launched on December 12 from the area of Kotelnikovo and made large gains on the first day. Alarmed by this development, the STAVKA ordered the 2nd Guards Army to force-march to the region southwest of Stalingrad to counter this offensive. On November 29 Lt. Gen. R. Ya. Malinovskii had been appointed to command the Army; 2nd Guards was a large army by Soviet standards with more than 122,000 men, 2,325 guns and 469 tanks. Moving all of this took time and the bulk of these forces didn't arrive at the front until December 18 although 1st Guards Corps had disembarked some distance to the north five days earlier. The Army proceeded to take up defensive positions behind the Myshkova River, although by this time the German counteroffensive had largely been fought to a standstill. The strategic position had also been altered when Southwestern and Voronezh Fronts launched Operation Little Saturn on December 16 which soon had Army Group Don and the other Axis forces in the Caucasus region scrambling to save themselves.

Despite this difficult situation, on December 20 the LVII Panzer Corps was still struggling to hold bridgeheads over the Myshkova in the faint hope that the relief operation could be renewed. At the same time, Soviet forces, based on one regiment of the 87th Division, were clinging to a south bank bridgehead at Gromoslavka which may have been reinforced by elements of the 98th, now occupying a line along the north bank from Nizhnekumsky and east through Gromoslavka to Ivanovka. The defenders were able to keep the 6th and 17th Panzer Divisions separated on the next evening. According to the combat journal of 2nd Guards for December 21:

The forces of 2nd Guards Army held back the enemy along the Gromoslavka, Ivanovka, Vasil'evka, and Kapkinka line with a stubborn defense. The enemy tried to drive our forces from Gromoslavka. 18 bombers worked over the station systematically, and, at 1430 hours, and enemy force of up to 40 tanks attacked the southern outskirts of Gromoslavka, lost 9 tanks which burned, and were forced back to their jumping-off positions.

The 98th was supported by the 20th Separate Tank Destroyer Brigade in this fighting. By the next morning most of the rest of the Army had arrived in its positions along the Myshkova, and 17th Panzer was forced to abandon its bridgehead at Nizhnekumsky.

=== Tormosin Offensive ===
Planning for an operation to push back Army Group Don began even before 2nd Guards had fully reached the front. By December 24 the Army Group commander, Field Marshal E. von Manstein, had transferred the 6th Panzer west of the Don, leaving his LVII Panzer Corps with little to oppose a Soviet advance on Kotelnikovo. In order to fill the gap between the Little Saturn and Kotelnikovo drives, the STAVKA issued orders to 5th Shock and 5th Tank Army to begin an offensive westward across the Don and Chir rivers in the direction of Tormosin; this was reinforced by roughly half of the forces of 2nd Guards, which would join in 5th Shock's attack on December 29. The immediate objective was to encircle and destroy Corps Mieth, consisting of the 336th and 384th Infantry Divisions and assorted smaller commands under command of Army Gen. F. Mieth as part of 4th Panzer Army. The main forces of 2nd Guards Army had already thrust south across the Askay River with its right flank, including 1st Guards Corps, beginning to march across the Don. On the first day of the offensive the 33rd Guards forced a crossing just north of Verkhne-Kurmoiarskii, assisted by light tanks of the 2nd Guards Mechanized Corps. Over that night the 2nd Guards Army was transferred to the new Southern Front.

Late in the evening of December 31 the 2nd Guards Mechanized liberated Tormosin although due to a communications error this news did not appear in the STAVKA summary until January 2, 1943. By now the German Group Bassenge was retreating westward to the Tsimla River to link up with 11th Panzer Division while the 384th and the right wing of 336th Infantry were also withdrawing in the same direction. These moves brought the Tormosin offensive to an end.

== Drive on Rostov ==
As of January 1 the 98th had been detached to 13th Guards Rifle Corps, also part of 2nd Guards Army. This Corps formed the left (south) flank of the Army and also contained the 3rd and 49th Guards Rifle Divisions, led by the 51st and 55th Tank Brigades of 6th Mechanized Corps. The combined force was pursuing the 17th and 23rd Panzer Divisions, which were deployed in a semicircular defense of Komissarovskii, 15-30km south of Kotelnikovo. Already by this date Malinovskii's rifle divisions had lost about 20 percent of their strength. On the other hand, LVII Panzer Corps had only about 30 tanks operable, plus a few vehicles of the 203rd Assault Gun Battalion.

The next day a complex battle began for the Maloe Kuberle River and the town of Zimovniki. 13th Guards and 6th Mechanized Corps, with support on the left from 51st Army, drove south and southeast toward these objectives. Once there they encountered 17th Panzer, the 156th Regiment of 16th Motorized Division, and 5th SS Panzergrenadier Division Wiking in defensive positions from the Sal River at Frolov to Zimovniki, which was on the Kotelnikovo–Rostov rail line. What began as a meeting engagement grew into a pitched battle which expanded southward as further elements of 51st Army arrived. The 98th was currently some 20-25km west of Dubovskoye. On January 3, LVII Panzer counterattacked and retook the gains made by 6th Mechanized Corps the previous day. Malinovskii ordered 13th Guards Corps to attack eastward on January 4 with the 98th and the 3rd Guards across the Sal so as to outflank the panzer corps from its strong defenses, but this plan was preempted when the 156th Regiment was moved up to the river. In its evening report the Army headquarters stated that the 98th was between Marker 42.9 and Dobrovolskii, 15-20km southeast of Tsimlianskaya. On January 4, the division's strength was recorded as 8,503 personnel.

A stalemate ensued in the area for nearly three more days, despite the fact that all the German units were holding very wide sectors. 13th Guards Corps continually pushed southwestward along the Sal on LVII Panzer's left; slowly but steadily the two Soviet armies eroded the German defenses at considerable cost to both sides. At 0230 hours on January 6 a series of exchanges began between 2nd Guards, the STAVKA, and Southern Front, toward the end of which the 98th was ordered to attack toward Martynovka and Bolshaya Orlovka, both on the Sal, in support of the 3rd Guards Tank Corps, which had been making a deep raid into the German positions since January 3. Seryogin was directed to "widen and strengthen 3rd Guards Tank Corps' penetration sector and subsequently reach the Bagaevskaia region", where the Corps, under command of Lt. Gen. P. A. Rotmistrov, whould set up its headquarters. Malinovskii was to send two more rifle divisions to support the tanks, while Rotmistrov was ordered to take a crossing over the Manych River at Veselyi by January 7.

General Yeryomenko, now in command of Southern Front, conceived this move as a threat to both LVII Corps and to Rostov, which could also lead to the encirclement of Army Group A in the Caucasus. Meanwhile, Malinovskii was distraught that his Army had failed to force the panzer corps out of its defenses, directly criticizing the commanders of both 13th Guards and 6th Mechanized Corps for having "operated unsatisfactorily and insufficiently decisively over the last two days." As part of his new instructions, he ordered:

98th Rifle Division will advance into the Bol'shaia Orlovka and Novoselovka regions by 1800 hours [on January 7], and, while leaving a strong detachment of no fewer than 2 battalions with artillery in Martynovka, capture Batlaevskaia and Nemetsko-Potapovskii with reconnaissance detachments.

Once the entire new plan was carried out the 49th Guards, 3rd Guards, and the 98th would have deployed from east to west on a 75km-wide sector along the line Nizhniaia Serebriakovka–Bolshaia Orlovka. 18th Guards Tank Brigade was already at the latter place, with a tenuous link to the 98th. Malinovskii's reserve 300th Rifle Division was also intended to reinforce 3rd Guards Tanks, but was still 40-50km to the rear. Rotmistrov was out on a limb, without infantry support and short of fuel. At this time high temperatures were in the range of -8° to -11° C. Early on January 7 the LVII Corps began a retrograde back to a new defensive line on the Bolshoe Kuberle River, roughly 20-25km to the rear, covered by hasty counterattacks by rearguards. The commander of 13th Guards Corps, Maj. Gen. P. G. Chanchibadze, reported:

On 13th Gds. RC's front, during the day the enemy launched three counterattacks. The first, at 1030 hours... by up to 60 submachine gunners and four tanks, was repulsed... The third counterattack was undertaken by a great quantity of tanks and submachine gunners riding on the tanks...
The massive counterattacks were repulsed, and the corps' units destroyed 32 tanks.
By 1900 hours the corps' units occupied the following positions:
98th RD - after leaving 308th RR in the Martynovka region, the two other regiments reached positions from Nesmianovka to 1 kilometre east of Nesmianovka at 1700 hours.

The division had managed to advance up to 20km north of the Sal, acquiring a favorable position to either reinforce Rotmistrov or wheel to the south to the west of Martynovka to get in the left rear of LVII Panzer. The latter move would have encountered a regiment of 17th Panzer. By contrast the two Guards divisions and 6th Mechanized gained just 5-10km due to the counterattacks and lost contact with the retreating force.

In a January 9 report by 13th Guards Corps the 98th was said to have "fought north of Sukhoi and Riaska and for Denisovskii," capturing about 33,000kg of grain, 20 horses, and four Romanian prisoners, while also destroying two tanks. North of the Don, during January 10-12, the 7th Panzer Division launched a counterstroke which inflicted considerable damage on 1st Guards Corps, forcing it to halt and consolidate. By January 14 the STAVKA had turned its attention back south of the river, still seeking a strategy to take Rostov and trap Army Group A. Rotmistrov was put in command of a combined force consisting of his own 3rd Guards Tanks, the 2nd and 5th Guards Mechanized Corps (former 6th Mechanized), plus the 98th, to attack from Bagayevskaya and Veselyi on the morning of January 17 with the objective of taking Bataysk and Rostov with one mechanized corps by the next morning. The right flank would be covered by the 300th Division, while the remainder of 13th Guards Corps would advance in second echelon to reach a line from Bataysk to Olginskaya by the end of January 21. This plan was approved by the STAVKA at 2100 hours.

"Mechanized Group Rotmistrov" was considerably spread out, and under heavy air attack, which had considerably damaged the 300th over the previous week. It was not capable of fully relieving 3rd Guards Tanks in its bridgeheads west of the Don. For these reasons and others Southern Front was still crawling toward the Manych and would not reach the jumping-off positions for this planned attack for nearly another week. The establishment strength of Yeryomenko's armored forces was over 600 tanks, but in fact numbered no more than 80. Army Group Don, in continuous combat since November 19, was in an even worse state. In the event, on January 17 the 98th relieved the 300th in the Pukhliakov bridgehead and reconnoitered toward Melikhovskaya. Two days later the division came under heavy counterattacks:

In the morning a group of tanks and up to a battalion of motorized infantry penetrated into the Samodurovka region and encircled the 98th Rifle Division's 166th Regiment, which was defending the village. The regiment's subunits, which were scattered in several groups, fought with exceptional determination. Only when the ammunition had run out and it became apparent that it was impossible to hold Samodurovka did the regiment's remnants withdraw to Manychskaia Station in the evening on 20 January.
On the same day, 44 enemy tanks with motorized infantry attacked 98th Rifle Division's 308th Regiment. Under attack by a superior enemy, small subunits of the regiment began to withdraw to Manychskaia. When enemy tanks and motorized infantry penetrated into the regiment's combat formation, they were greeted by accurate fire by the crew of 2nd Battery, 54th Guards Tank Destroyer Regiment. The battery commander, Senior Lieutenant I. L. Drozdov, with the help of two antitank rifle platoons, repelled the tank attack.
On 19-20 January, the enemy succeeded in pushing back our forces in a series of sectors; however, he was not able to reach the line of the Manych River.

This attack was carried out by the 156th Regiment of 16th Motorized with one battalion of its 60th Regiment. Elsewhere, the 2nd Guards Mechanized Corps, advance guard of Rotmistrov's Group, raided west into the Bataysk region, entering the city's outskirts and destroying an airfield before withdrawing.

At 2200 hours on January 22 the headquarters of 2nd Guards Army reported that the 98th had one regiment in Krasnyi and two in Manychskaia. They backed up 3rd Guards Tank and 2nd Guards Motorized Brigades in an attack that captured Reznikov and Pustoshkin, as did the other two divisions of 13th Guards Corps. This was soon met with a counterstroke from LVII Panzer, which retook much of the liberated territory, but failed to restore the line along the Manych. The battle between the panzer corps and the Guards army reached a climax the next day as Rotmistrov fought desperately to revive its push toward Bataysk as 17th and 11th Panzer Divisions sought to prevent it. By now, Stalin was directly intervening, and questioning Rotmistrov's decision the withdraw after his earlier raid. Both sides were aware of the vulnerable position of Army Group A. 13th Guards Corps was ordered "to conduct a decisive attack" on Zelenaya Roshcha. The fighting for Samodurovka was intense and the place changed hands several times. It was held by the 166th Regiment and the divisional training battalion, with the 4th and 308th Regiments at Krasny Farm, on the morning of January 23 when "50 enemy tanks and motorized infantry of armored personnel carriers" struck Samodurovka and again encircled the 166th, while some 37 tanks continued on the Krasny Farm, which also came under air attacks and artillery fire. Under orders of Colonel Seryogin the two regiments fell back across the river after covering the withdrawal of the headquarters and service units of 5th Guards Mechanized. The 166th and the training battalion held on until dark when they broke out and across the river as well.

Despite its battered state, at 1430 hours on January 24 the 2nd Guards was ordered to "complete regrouping its forces to the left wing by day's end on 25 January, launch a decisive strike toward Bataisk and Rostov on the morning of 26 January, [and] capture them by day's end...". This became moot as a concentrated German assault was launched to drive the Army, especially the Mechanized Group, back across the Manych. While this was unsuccessful, frustration with Rotmistrov's earlier withdrawal led to the disbandment of the Group, and the 98th returned to 1st Guards Corps. The pressure continued through January 27, at which time the 98th was reported as having just 457 active "bayonets" and eight antitank guns. Later that day it was ordered to pull back through the Army's attacking units and concentrate in the area of Azhivnov, Kudimov, and Elkin to serve as Malinovskii's reserve, reaching there the following afternoon. In the light of crises elsewhere after January 28 the 7th and 11th Panzer were withdrawn to the northwest and south, being replaced by several low-value units, but Southern Front remained fearful of a major counterattack while its forces remained stationary. Yeryomenko issued warning orders on January 31 which, among other moves, directed Malinovskii to "occupy the Staro-Zolotovskaia and Razdorskaia sector with 98th RD, with the subunits located in Kochetovskaia and Semikarakorskaia subordinate to it." Yeryomenko had become aware that 1st Panzer Army was finally moving through the Rostov "gate". Its weakened divisions moved through the city up to the night of February 2/3, and while he feared they might strike 2nd Guards south of the Don, Manstein had business elsewhere.

=== Fall of Bataysk and Rostov ===
In a February 1 report the 98th's losses since December 20 were itemized as 1,126 killed, 1,586 wounded, 115 sick, 138 frostbitten, 3,549 missing, 27 captured, and 161 other causes, for 6,712 total. This was fewer than its Corps-mates, the 24th and 33rd Guards, but still very high, especially in missing. At this time it was facing a battlegroup of the 384th Infantry Division, and was covering the boundary with 5th Shock Army with one battalion near Razdorskaia. At the end of February 3 Malinovskii reported that, "as a result of heavy fighting," the 11th and 17th Panzer and 16th Motorized Divisions had withdrawn toward Olginskaya while leaving covering forces, some of which were engaged by the 98th and 300th at Arpachin. Overnight on February 4/5 the LVII Panzer withdrew through Rostov, leaving just the 16th Motorized and the 111th Infantry Division south of the Don the next day; the latter held out in a small bridgehead around Bataysk until February 6. Once this was evacuated the two Soviet divisions took up defenses on the east bank of the Don on a line from Novozolotovskaya to Bagaevskaya. Overnight they were to capture Bessergenevskaya and Zaplavskaya.

As of the evening of February 7 the 98th and 300th Divisions were grouped into Group Kerchik, facing 4th Panzer Army's weak XXIX Army Corps. Over the following days a frustrating battle took place east of Rostov as 2nd Guards and 51st Armies tried to push through the city's suburbs. Group Kerchik continued guarding 2nd Guards' flank, although one regiment of the 300th unsuccessfully contested Bessergenevskaya. The 2nd Guards Mechanized "reached the center of Novocherkassk's southern outskirts," but was forced to halt at dusk due to strong mortar and artillery fire. During February 9 it became apparent that the 384th Infantry was preparing to evacuate the German strongpoint at Kanygin, and Colonel Seryogin was prompted to form a pursuit detachment should this occur. Otherwise the stalemate continued the next day.

The bulk of the two Armies struggled to break the German defense south of Novocherkassk. 2nd Guards' 0700 hours operational summary on February 11 stated in part:

98th RD has been on the march to the Bagaevskaia region since 2030 hours on 10 February 1943. The division's lead regiment passed through Karpovka at 0410 hours on 11 February 1943.

This advance was owing to XXIX Corps suddenly beginning to withdraw to the northwest. Near the end of the day the Army reported that the division, "after concentrating in the Bagaevskaia along with the 1101st GAR [Gun Artillery Regiment] began pursuing enemy forces in the general direction of Krivianskaia, Khotunuk, and Ianovo-Grushevskii [up to 10km north-northwest of Novocherkassk] at 1100 hours..." At 2030 new orders were issued that directed the division to capture Krivianskaya, 5km east of Novocherkassk by the next morning before advancing through Borovskoi Kurgan toward Krasiukovskaya to take the northern part of that place by dusk. 2nd Guards Army was now under command of Lt. Gen. Ya. G. Kreizer.

=== Race to the Mius ===
At 0600 hours on February 13 the 98th took Novocherkassk and began clearing it as German forces withdrew to the west. Two regiments had reached a line through Krasiukovskaya and were moving on toward Bolshoe Yudino. Rostov was finally liberated on February 14, and it was understood by both sides that the next German defense line would be along the Mius River, as it had been after the first liberation of the city in 1941. Given the heavy casualties to date on both sides, what followed would be a race to the Mius by "cripples." On that date the 4th Rifle Regiment was engaged on the eastern outskirts of Kamennyi Brod while the other two regiments were on the approaches to Grushevskaya, 35km northeast of Rostov. On February 15 the division was consolidating at Voloshino along with the 24th Guards, with orders to prepare for a westward march overnight on February 17/18. By this time the 98th was back under command of 13th Guards Corps.

The division was moved into the Army reserve at 1500 hours on February 17, now concentrating at Pochtovyi Yar and Makukhin, some 45km east-southeast of Matveyev Kurgan. It remained in reserve two days later, now at Bolshaya Kirsanovka. General Kreizer was ordered to take the Kurgan on February 20, but this would require an advance of some 10km through prepared German defenses that had already thwarted over the two previous days. The 33rd Guards was especially hard hit by counterattacks from 16th Motorized. The 98th entered the battle on February 22 at Komunna, 8km west-northwest of Matveyev Kurgan; by 2000 it had reached a position 300m east of this place with its right flank and on its left to within 500m of "the railroad trackman's hut." Meanwhile, the 4th Guards Mechanized Corps had advanced across the Mius before being encircled and forced to break out as individuals and small groups apart from four tanks and 15 vehicles that reached the lines of 3rd Guards Division. 13th Guards Corps had a small bridgehead on the west bank near Demidovka and Shaposhnikova but faced 100m-high hills held by 23rd Panzer. Although fighting would continue into early March, the offensive was effectively over.

On February 24 the 98th was reported as:

... fighting south of Hill 114.9 and digging in. At 1500 and enemy force of 8 tanks, 4 APCs, and about a company of infantry counterattacked from the Komunna region toward Hill 114.9. The counterattack was repulsed. An enemy Iu-88 aircraft was shot down at 1200 hours.

At 0920 on February 25 the 2nd Guards Army was ordered to go over to the defense, and the 98th returned to 1st Guards Corps. The Corps, now with three divisions, a tank destroyer regiment, and a battalion of mechanized troops, was to defend from Hill 105.9 to Hill 114.9 and was tasked with preventing any German penetration toward Matveyev Kurgan and Novo-Rotovka with antitank strongpoints. Despite this order the Corps was expected to continue limited attacks to improve its positions until February 28. in a February 27 report the division was stated as having a total of 1,678 personnel, of which 455 were "bayonets".

On March 10 the division was ordered to pull out of the line and move to Sverdlovsk for rebuilding. In recognition of its role in the liberation of Novocherkassk and other successes in the previous campaign, on April 16 it was redesignated as the 86th Guards Rifle Division.

== 3rd Formation ==
A third 98th Rifle Division on April 28, 1943, in the 55th Army of Leningrad Front, based on a pair of rifle brigades.

=== 162nd Rifle Brigade ===
This unit was formed in Leningrad in September 1942 and was immediately placed in the Front reserves. It remained there until January 1943 when it was assigned to 42nd Army on its Neva River line. Within a few weeks it had returned to the Front reserves, before going back to the 42nd in March. These moves were largely due to the failure of the Army's attacks across the river to expand the corridor to the rest of the USSR that had been created in January during Operation Iskra. The 162nd returned to the Front reserves in April, and on April 23 it was disbanded to help create the new 98th, although some elements may have gone into the new 156th Rifle Division in May.

=== 250th Rifle Brigade ===
The 250th was formed in the 15th Army of Far Eastern Front in March 1942. It remained there until July when it began moving to the west, eventually being assigned to the reserves of Bryansk Front before entering the front lines as part of that Front's 38th Army. After two months it was returned to the rear, now in the Volga Military District, remaining there until nearly the end of the year. In early December it began moving to the north, and crossed the ice road on Lake Ladoga into the reserves of Leningrad Front. In late January 1943 it was briefly assigned to 67th Army before moving into 55th Army along the Neva in February. In April it was disbanded to help form the new 98th.

The new division received Col. Nikolai Sergeevich Nikonorov as its commander. This officer had most recently led the 14th Fortified Region of 55th Army in the Kolpino area, and would remain in command of the 98th until its disbandment. Its order of battle remained much the same as the previous formations:

- 4th Rifle Regiment
- 166th Rifle Regiment
- 308th Rifle Regiment
- 153rd Artillery Regiment
- 157th Antitank Battalion
- 76th Reconnaissance Company
- 84th Sapper Battalion
- 202nd Signal Battalion (later 324th Signal Company)
- 50th Medical/Sanitation Battalion
- 109th Chemical Defense (Anti-gas) Platoon
- 6th Motor Transport Company
- 277th Field Bakery
- 990th Divisional Veterinary Hospital
- 2289th Field Postal Station
- 1227th Field Office of the State Bank

Shortly after it was formed the 98th was assigned to 67th Army, before it was transferred to the Coastal Operations Group of the Front, which was located in the Oranienbaum Bridgehead to the west of the city.

== Leningrad-Novgorod Offensive ==
In October the 98th was assigned to 43rd Rifle Corps, still in the Coastal Operational Group, but the Group was soon redesignated as the new formation of 2nd Shock Army, which was led by Lt. Gen. I. I. Fedyuninskii. At to the start of the offensive the division was still under these commands, the Corps also contained the 48th and 131st Rifle Divisions.

=== Krasnoye Selo-Ropsha Offensive ===
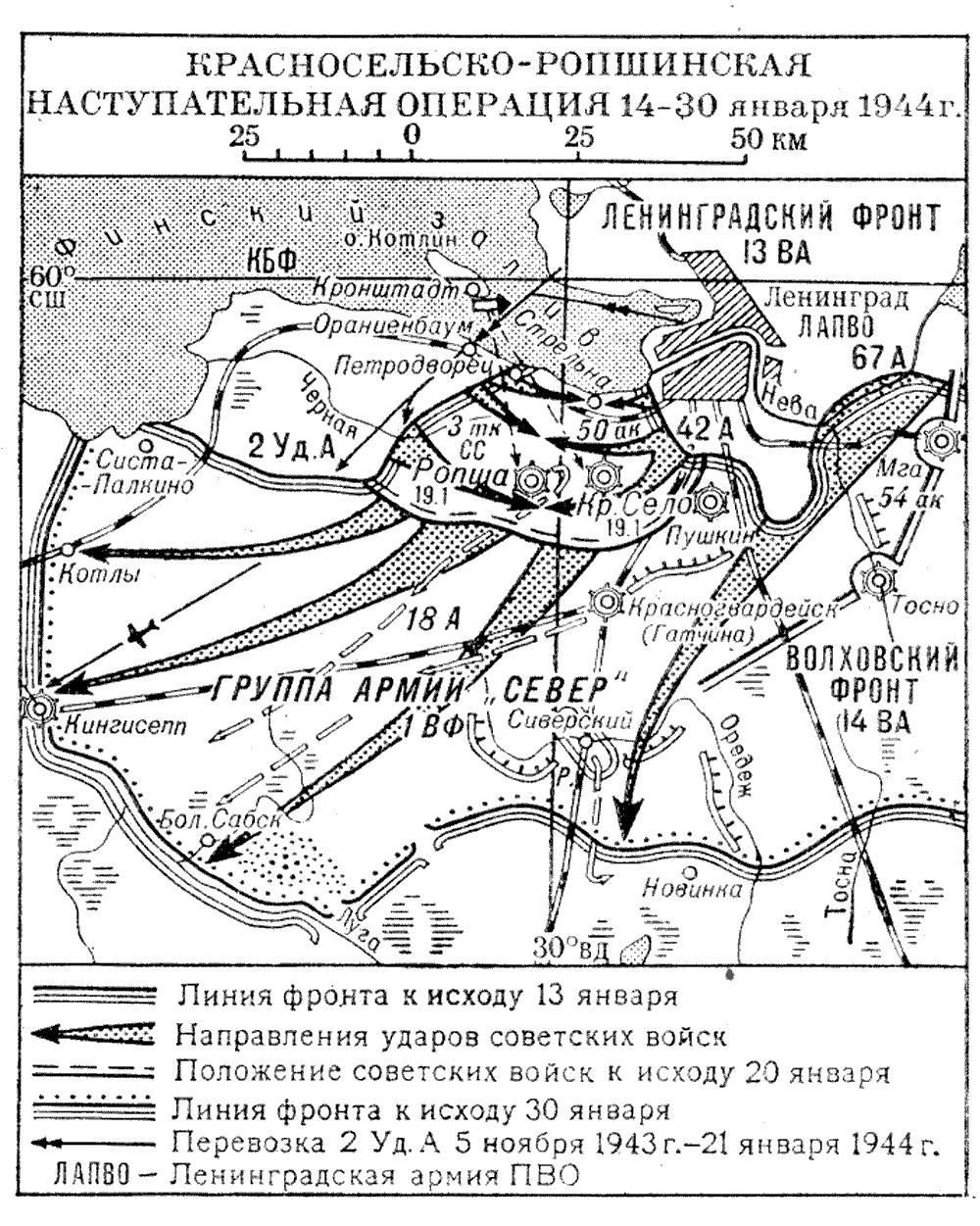
Soviet-era map of the offensive

The Front commander, Army Gen. L. A. Govorov, planned to have 2nd Shock and 42nd Armies break through the German lines they faced and then link up at Ropsha, cutting off the German forces between that place and the Gulf of Finland. This would also reestablish land communications with Oranienbaum. Fedyuninskii placed his 43rd and 122nd Rifle Corps in first echelon of the attack, with the 98th in second echelon of the 43rd.

The offensive began at dawn on January 14 with a massive artillery preparation of 104,000 shells over 65 minutes against the positions of the 9th and 10th Luftwaffe Field Divisions. Despite extensive fortifications built since 1941 the massed Soviet riflemen of the first echelon divisions, assisted by tanks, soon overcame the forward defenses and by day's end had gained up to 3km on a 10km-wide front. The advance continued overnight as the 131st and 90th Rifle Divisions, supported by 2nd and 204th Tank Regiments and 152nd Tank Brigade, pushed forward another 4km, and the next day shattered what was left of 10th Luftwaffe Division, while the 168th Rifle Division was committed from second echelon. 2nd Shock was finally halted by heavy fire west of Ropsha. 42nd Army also made good progress from its side on the first two days.

January 16 saw the battle develop with greater fury and during its course Fedyuninskii's forces completed the penetration of the main defensive belt. He now formed a small mobile group from a tank brigade, a self-propelled artillery regiment, a battalion of infantry in trucks, an artillery battalion, and other units with orders to take Ropsha at all costs. Counterattacks brought this to a halt halfway to the objective. While the German High Command debated the retreat of 18th Army the entire 2nd Shock Army surged ahead on January 18 and a combined force of 43rd and 122nd Corps took Ropsha the next day. In recognition the division received a battle honor:

ROPSHA - ...98th Rifle Division (Colonel Nikanorov, Nikolai Sergeevich)... By order of the Supreme High Command of 19 January 1944 and a commendation in Moscow, the troops who participated in the battles for the liberation of Krasnoye Selo and Ropsha are given a salute of 20 artillery salvoes from 224 guns.

The same day, at 2100 hours the 462nd Rifle Regiment of the 168th linked up with the 54th Engineer Battalion of 42nd Army's mobile group just south of the town. On the morning of January 20 the two Armies met all along their fronts, closing the door behind the German grouping to the north.

The next objective, apart from mopping up the encircled German forces, was to advance in the direction of Luga. This would involve 42nd Army capturing Krasnogvardeisk and 2nd Shock protecting its right flank. By January 24 the Army was advancing along the Krasnogvardeisk–Kingisepp railroad, but only made modest gains against stiffening resistance. During the next two days the 43rd and 109th Rifle Corps, advancing on the Army's right flank, gained up to 16km. Unbeknownst to Hitler, the chief of staff of Army Group North ordered the overdue withdrawal to begin overnight on January 27/28. On February 4, in recognition of its further successes in this campaign, the 98th was awarded the Order of the Red Banner.

== Battle of Narva ==
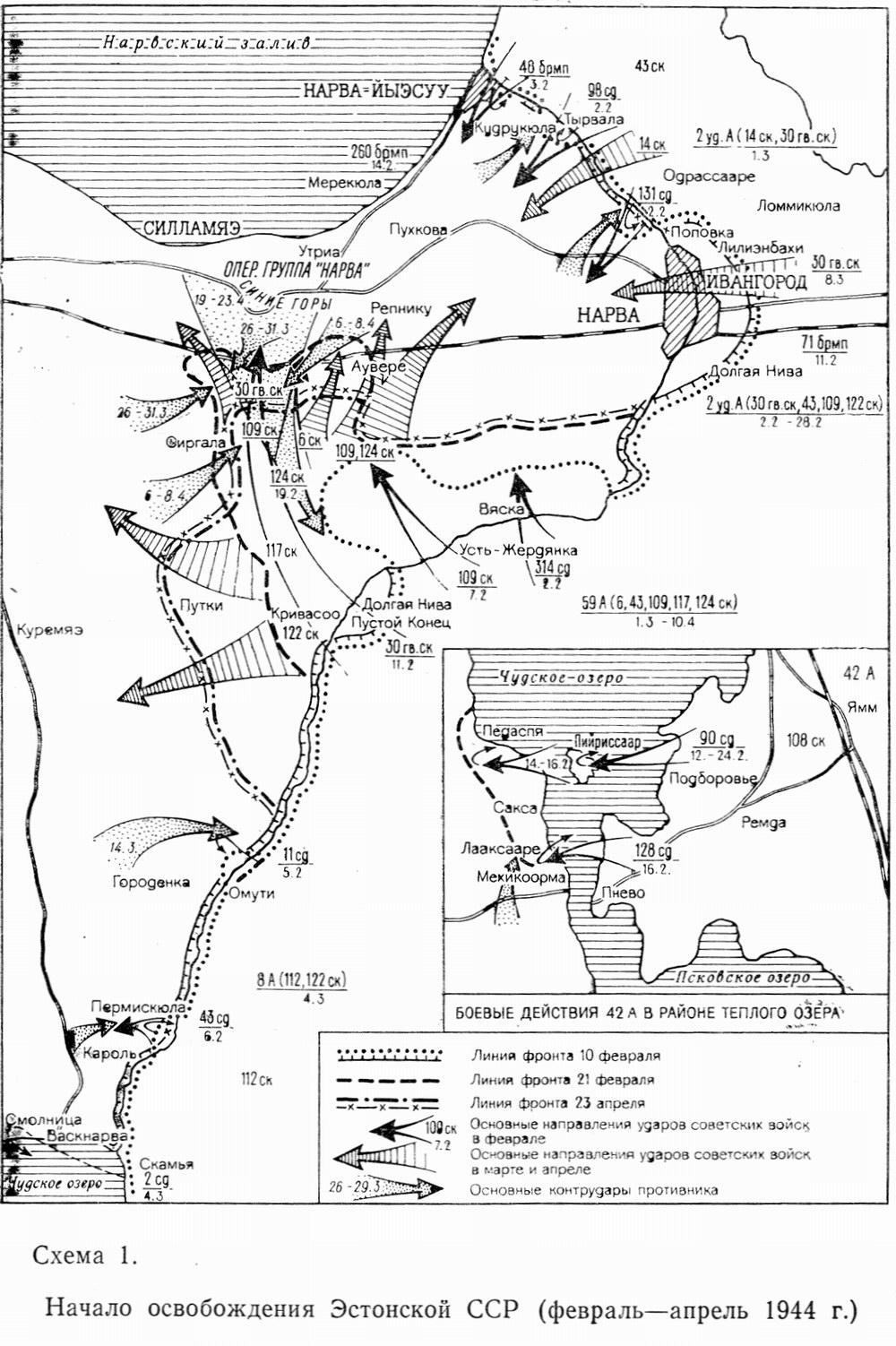
Battle of Narva, February 2 - April 23, 1944. Note the 98th's initial bridgehead north of the city.

On January 29 Govorov ordered 2nd Shock and 42nd Armies to force the Luga River prior to clearing the south shore of the Gulf of Finland, then reach and establish bridgeheads over the Narva River prior to an advance into Estonia. This advance began on February 1 and, after a 15-minute artillery preparation, initially made rapid progress. While 109th Corps took Kingisepp the 43rd and 122nd Corps pushed on to the Narva, taking lodgements north and south of the Narva fortress respectively; the 98th was in the vicinity of Tõrvajõe. In light of this success Govorov transferred the 30th Guards Rifle Corps to Fedyuninskii's command. With this assistance he was to widen and deepen his bridgeheads, break the defense west of the river, envelop and take Narva. This would be assisted by the Baltic Fleet landing the 115th and 260th Naval Infantry Brigades in the German rear. The line was defended by the III SS Panzer Corps, which was armored in name only.

2nd Shock battled for a week to destroy III SS Corps with little success. A new plan was approved by Govorov and the fighting was renewed on February 11 but fell well short of its objectives. 43rd Corps advanced up to 2km on a 4km-wide front but was halted by the 227th Infantry Division and the SS Nederland Brigade. Southwest of Narva the 109th and 122nd Corps managed to gain 12km to the west and northwest over five days of combat before also being forced to a standstill. 30th Guards Corps managed to cut the road and railroad from Iykhvi to Narva on February 15 and captured Auvere two days later before being stopped by counterattacks. The amphibious landing on the night of February 13/14 was a minor disaster with only 432 naval infantry reaching land without communications to the Fleet and, therefore, without any supporting fire. A pair of German combat groups would destroy this force over four days of fighting.

On February 14 the STAVKA signaled that Narva must be taken by the end of February 17 "for military as well as political reasons." Fedyuninskii now reinforced the southern bridgehead with two more rifle corps, but this made little difference in the face of significant German reinforcements; on February 23 this grouping was named Operational Group Narva, and it would continue to hold through the rest of the winter and the following spring. During the next battle, from February 17–28, the southern bridgehead was expanded, and 43rd Corps was moved to 59th Army toward the end of this period, but Narva was not cut off. By now all of Govorov's forces were considerably weakened, but he called for a concentrated attack on March 1. 43rd and 109th Corps attacked at dawn after a 20-minute artillery preparation, but this was inadequate and the Soviet force struck heavy resistance, especially at Sirgala and Putki. Following powerful counterattacks the fighting would continue on 59th Army's front until April 8 in a bloody stalemate. In late March 43rd Corps was reassigned to 8th Army.

Leningrad Front went over to the defense on April 12, but on April 19 the III SS Panzer and LIV Army Corps launched Operation Narva following a 30-minute artillery preparation, in an effort to retake the Auvere bridgehead, defended by 8th Army. While the Army commander, Lt. Gen. F. N. Starikov, claimed to have beaten back 17 separate attacks on this first day, in the five days of fighting that followed his forces were pushed out of a sector from Auvere Station to Vanamyiza. Govorov was sufficiently impressed that he began construction of a new reserve line, and suspended operations in the Narva sector until July. By the beginning of May the 98th had been reassigned to 122nd Corps, still in 8th Army. During July it moved back to 2nd Shock with this Corps.

== Baltic Offensives ==
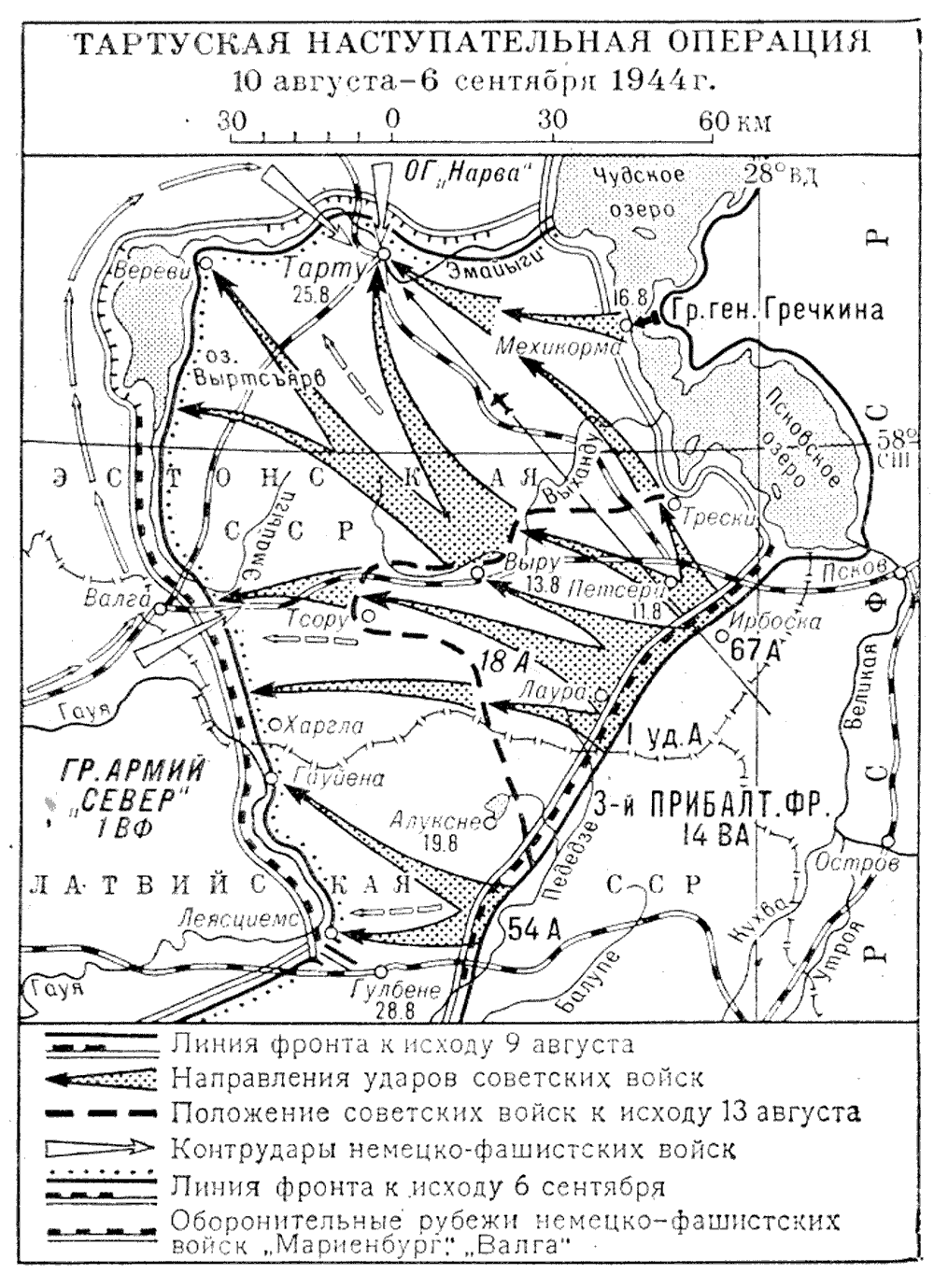
Tartu offensive. Note the initial location of 67th Army.

The final battle for Narva began on July 25 and the city fell the next day. By this time the summer offensive against Army Group Center was well underway and Soviet forces were deep into Latvia and Lithuania, leaving Army Group North no alternative to withdrawing from Estonia. Early the next month the 98th was transferred south with its 122nd Corps to join 67th Army in 3rd Baltic Front. On August 25 the division took part in the capture of Tartu, and the 4th Rifle Regiment (Colonel Kuznetsov, Aleksei Aleksandrovich) was awarded its name as a battle honor. In the course of this fighting Krasnoarmeets Grigorii Nikolaevich Kalinichenko, a rifleman from Ukraine, distinguished himself sufficiently to be made a Hero of the Soviet Union. On August 24, while fighting for the town of Elva, he took the place of his wounded platoon commander and led his comrades in knocking out three tanks, two armored personnel carriers, and killing or wounding about 150 German soldiers and officers. He was credited with some 25 of these personally. Three days later he led the platoon again in an assault crossing of the Emajõgi River, during which he was wounded but remained in battle. Kalinichenko would be awarded his Gold Star on March 24, 1945. He survived the war, returning to his home town in the Lebedyn Raion where he worked on a collective farm, and he died there on August 9, 1984, at the age of 75.

In September the 98th joined the 189th Rifle Division in the 112th Rifle Corps, still in 67th Army. By the middle of the month the division was located near Antsla in southern Estonia, and by the first week of October the Army had reached the Gulf of Riga in the vicinity of Salacgrīva, Latvia, before moving south toward the Latvian capital. Riga fell on October 13 and the 166th Rifle Regiment (Lt. Colonel Babyushkin, Pyotr Nikitch) was awarded its name as an honorific. Almost immediately the 3rd Baltic was disbanded and 67th Army returned to Leningrad Front, but the 98th was moved with 112th Corps to 1st Shock Army in 2nd Baltic Front. Until January 1945 it served under these commands, helping to contain the remnants of Army Group North trapped in the Courland Pocket, moving to the Army reserves later that month, before beginning to move south in February to join the 93rd Rifle Corps in the reserves of 1st Ukrainian Front.

== Upper Silesian Offensive ==
At the end of February the 93rd Corps, under command of Maj. Gen. Ya. S. Sharoburko, was operating in Silesia and also contained the 239th and 391st Rifle Divisions and was soon assigned to 59th Army, which was in the Ratibor area. The 98th would remain in this Army for the duration of the war.

On February 24, immediately following the Lower Silesian Offensive, the Front commander, Marshal I. S. Konev, presented his plan for subsequent operations. Upon the arrival of the Front's main group of forces in the Neisse area the 59th and 60th Armies were to develop the attack from the bridgehead north of Ratibor to the west and southwest. Ultimately this operation would encircle and destroy the German group of forces in the Oppeln salient. 59th Army would launch its main attack along the left flank with the 93rd and 115th Rifle Corps and the 7th Guards Mechanized Corps in the general direction of Kostenthal and Zultz. 93rd Corps would have just the 98th in the first echelon, tasked with breaking through the German defense on a sector from 1,000m south of Langlieben to a creek 1,000m north of Pulau. It would then exploit toward Neisedel, Deutsch-Rasselwitz, and Zeiselwitz. After the division reached the east bank of Tiefenburg River the 391st would be committed on the second day while the main forces of the 239th, less one rifle regiment in Army reserve, comprised the third echelon to develop the offensive's success.

The offensive on the 59th and 60th Army's sector began at 0850 hours on March 15 following an 80-minute artillery preparation and went largely according to plan although more slowly than expected. The main German defense zone was broken through on a 12km front and the Armies advanced 6-8km during the day. Bad weather prevented air support before noon, and the advancing forces also had to repel ten counterattacks. In response Konev ordered that the advance continue through the night. During the day on March 16 the 59th Army managed to advance another 3-9km, and the 93rd Corps and 7th Guards Mechanized cleared the entire depth of the German defenses and set the stage for the success of the attack over the next two days. By the end of March 17 the two corps had reached the line Tomas–Schenau–Kittledorf while the 115th Corps covered against flank attacks from the north. By noon on the next day the 93rd and 7th Guards forced the Hotzenplotz River and began to pursue the remnants of the defeated German forces. During the day the 59th Army linked up with the 21st Army, encircling the 20th SS, 168th and 344th Infantry Divisions, part of the 18th SS Panzergrenadier Division, and several independent regiments and battalions in the area southwest of Oppeln.

With the encirclement completed the 93rd Corps was tasked with preventing the encircled grouping from breaking out to the southwest. The 98th was to attack on a line from Deutsch-Rasselwitz toward Rosenberg in order to split the pocket. On March 19 an attack against several units the Corps was quickly recognized as a feint to disguise the actual direction of the planned breakout, which was in the 21st Army's sector. All these efforts were beaten back, as was a break-in attempt by the Hermann Göring Panzer Division towards Steinau. At the same time the remaining encircling forces attacked into the pocket to break up and liquidate the defenders. By March 20 this task was largely completed, with total German casualties of 30,000 killed, 15,000 prisoners, 21 aircraft, 57 tanks and assault guns and 464 guns of various calibers. On March 21 the 59th Army resumed its advance in the direction of Jägerndorf which it reached but did not take on March 31. Due to the toll of casualties during the offensive and inadequate supplies of ammunition, the Army was ordered to go over to the defense. On April 26 all three rifle regiments of the 98th would be awarded the Order of Alexander Nevsky for their parts in the reduction of the pocket.

== Postwar ==
By the start of May the division had left 93rd Corps and was under direct command of 59th Army. Beginning on May 6 it advanced with its Army in the Prague offensive, and took part in the final encirclement of Army Group Center. When the fighting ended its personnel shared the full title 98th Rifle, Ropsha, Order of the Red Banner Division. (Russian: 98-я стрелковая Ропшинская Краснознамённая дивизия.) According to STAVKA Order No. 11096 of May 29, 1945, part 8, the 98th is listed as one of the rifle divisions to be "disbanded in place". It was disbanded in accordance with the directive in July 1945.

Colonel Nikonorov had an ill-starred career postwar. He was initially given posts in the Soviet part of the Allied Commission for Austria before being relieved of these duties and eventually being appointed senior inspector of the Directorate of Combat and Physical Training of the Transcaucasian Military District in February 1947. He left this position in July before being made deputy commander of the 344th Rifle Division in September. On the night of October 8/9, 1948, he was arrested "for the theft of state property", found guilty by a tribunal on October 22, and sentenced to 20 years imprisonment in a labor camp. His eventual fate is unknown.
