= Yenapayevo =

Yenapayevo Енапаево
- Selo
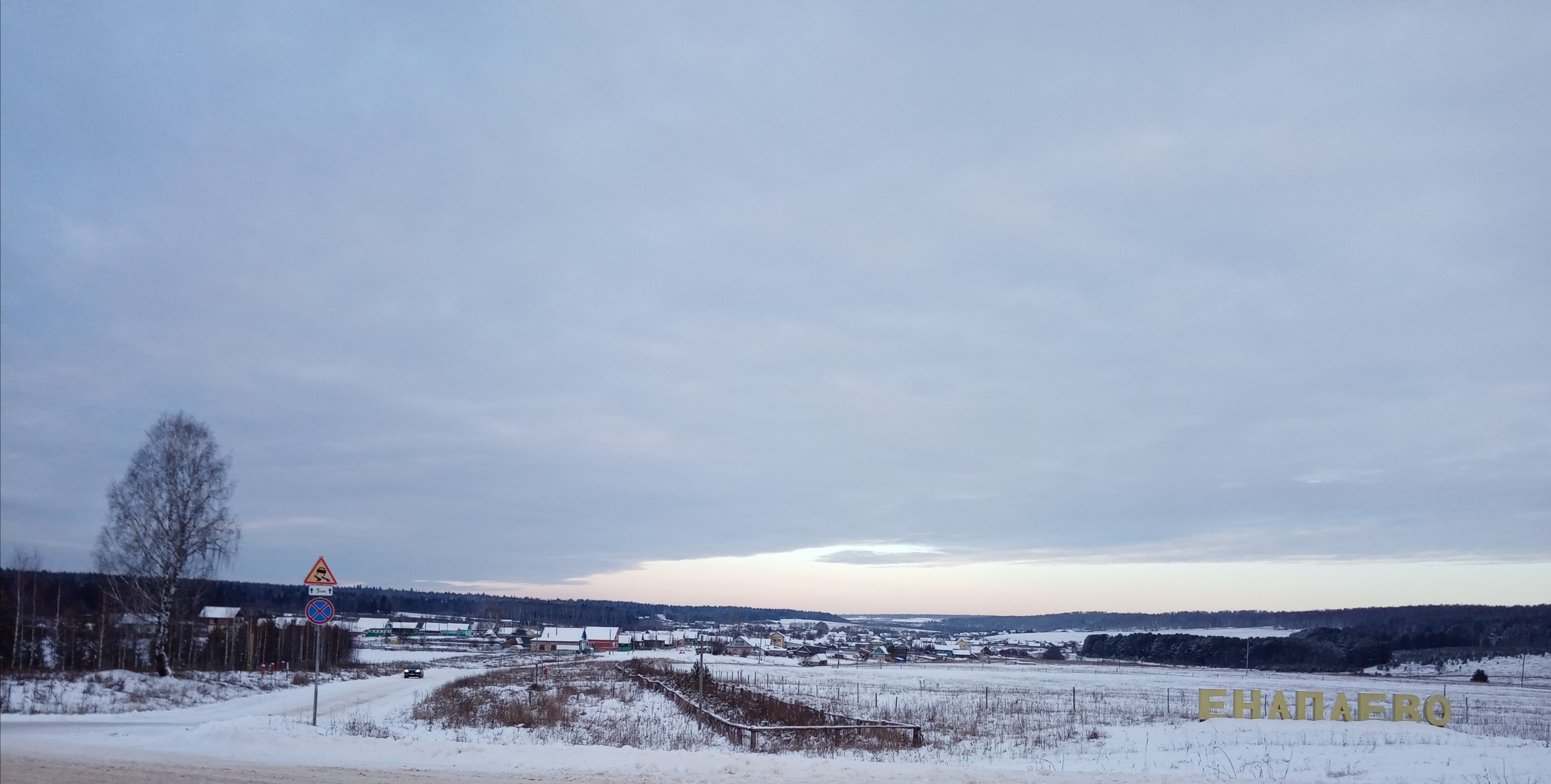
- Yenapeyovo village. Perm region

- Location within Perm Krai Location within Russia
- Coordinates: 56°34′N 56°53′E
- Country: Russia
- Region: Perm Krai
- District: Oktyabrsky District
- Time zone: UTC+5:00

Yenapayevo (Russian: Енапаево) is a rural locality (a selo) and the administrative center of Yenapayevskoye Rural Settlement, Oktyabrsky District, Perm Krai, Russia. The population was 760 as of 2010. There are 7 streets.

== Geography ==
Yenapayevo is located 26 km northwest of Oktyabrsky (the district's administrative centre) by road. Budkeyevo is the nearest rural locality.
