= Shelestovo =

Shelestovo Шелестово
- Selo
- Location within Volgograd Oblast Location within Russia
- Coordinates: 47°58′51″N 44°03′00″E
- Country: Russia
- Region: Volgograd Oblast
- District: Oktyabrsky District
- Time zone: UTC+4:00

Shelestovo (Russian: Шелестово) is a rural locality (a selo) and the administrative center of Shelestovskoye Rural Settlement, Oktyabrsky District, Volgograd Oblast, Russia. The population was 910 as of 2010. There are 10 streets.

== Geography ==
Shelestovo is located 39 km east of Oktyabrsky (the district's administrative centre) by road. Goncharovka is the nearest rural locality.
