= Ilmen-Suvorovsky =

Ilmen-Suvorovsky Ильмень-Суворовский
- Khutor
- Location within Volgograd Oblast Location within Russia
- Coordinates: 48°13′N 43°08′E
- Country: Russia
- Region: Volgograd Oblast
- District: Oktyabrsky District
- Time zone: UTC+4:00

Ilmen-Suvorovsky (Russian: Ильмень-Суворовский) is a rural locality (a khutor) and the administrative center of Ilmenskoye Rural Settlement, Oktyabrsky District, Volgograd Oblast, Russia. The population was 787 as of 2010. There are 10 streets.

== Geography ==
Ilmen-Suvorovsky is located in steppe, on the east bank of the Tsimlyansk Reservoir, 70 km northwest of Oktyabrsky (the district's administrative centre) by road. Molokanovsky is the nearest rural locality.
