= Vodyansky =

Vodyansky Водянский
- Khutor
- Location within Volgograd Oblast Location within Russia
- Coordinates: 47°58′N 43°24′E
- Country: Russia
- Region: Volgograd Oblast
- District: Oktyabrsky District
- Time zone: UTC+4:00

Vodyansky (Russian: Водянский) is a rural locality (a khutor) in Zalivskoye Rural Settlement, Oktyabrsky District, Volgograd Oblast, Russia. The population was 248 as of 2010. There are 7 streets.

== Geography ==
Vodyansky is located in steppe, on Yergeni, on the left bank of the Aksay Yesaulovsky River, 20 km west of Oktyabrsky (the district's administrative centre) by road. Zalivsky is the nearest rural locality.
