= Oktyabrsky District =

Oktyabrsky District may refer to:

- Oktyabrsky District, Russia, several districts and city districts in Russia
- Oktyabrsky District, alternative name of Kastrychnitski District of the city of Minsk, Belarus
- Oktyabrsky District, before 1997 the name of Mugalzhar District in Aktobe Region, Kazakhstan
- Oktyabr District, Bishkek (Oktyabrsky District), a city district of Bishkek, Kyrgyzstan
- Akciabrski District (Oktyabrsky District), a district of Gomel Oblast, Belarus
- Zhovtnevy Raion (Oktyabrsky City District), former name of Novobavarskyi District, a city district of Kharkiv, Ukraine

== See also ==
- Oktyabrsky (disambiguation)
- Oktyabrsky Okrug (disambiguation)
