= Vodino =

Vodino Водино
- Selo
- Location within Volgograd Oblast Location within Russia
- Coordinates: 48°01′N 43°58′E
- Country: Russia
- Region: Volgograd Oblast
- District: Oktyabrsky District
- Time zone: UTC+4:00

Vodino (Russian: Водино) is a rural locality (a selo) in Shelestovskoye Rural Settlement, Oktyabrsky District, Volgograd Oblast, Russia. The population was 147 as of 2010. There are 4 streets.

== Geography ==
Vodino is located in steppe, on Yergeni, 42 km northeast of Oktyabrsky (the district's administrative centre) by road. Shelestovo is the nearest rural locality.
