= Oktyabrsky =

Oktyabrsky, Oktyabrskaya or Oktyabrskoye may refer to:

== Places ==
=== Oktyabrsky ===
- Oktyabrsky, Russia (Oktyabrskaya, Oktyabrskoye), several inhabited localities in Russia
- Oktyabrsky, Republic of Adygea, Russia
- Oktyabrsky Airport, an airport in the Republic of Bashkortostan, Russia
- Oktyabrsky Island, in Kaliningrad, Russia
- Oktyabrsky Urban Settlement, several municipal urban settlements in Russia
- Cape October (Mys Oktyabrsky) in Severnaya Zemlya, Russia

=== Oktyabrskaya ===
- Oktyabrskaya (Minsk Metro), a station of the Minsk Metro, Belarus
- Oktyabrskaya (Novosibirsk Metro), a station of the Novosibirsk Metro, Russia
- Oktyabrskaya (Kaluzhsko-Rizhskaya line), a station of the Moscow Metro, Russia
- Oktyabrskaya (Koltsevaya line), a station of the Moscow Metro, Russia
- Oktyabrskaya Railway, a broad gauge railway in Russia

=== Oktyabrskoye ===
- Oktyabrskoye (air base) used by the Russian Air Force 15 miles (24 km) east of Hvardiiske, Simferopol Raion, Crimea.
- Oktyabrskoye, Panfilov District is a village in Panfilov District, Chüy Region, Kyrgyzstan

== Other uses ==
- Oktyabrsky (surname)
- Soviet cruiser Admiral Oktyabrsky

== See also ==
- Oktyabrsky District (disambiguation), several districts and city districts in the countries of the former Soviet Union
- Oktyabrsky Okrug (disambiguation), various divisions in Russia
- Aktsyabarski, an urban-type settlement in Belarus
- October Revolution, of November 1917 in Russia
- Oktyabr (disambiguation)
