= Chemashi =

Coordinates: 63°02′11″N 65°10′59″E

Chemashi Чемаши
- village
- Interactive map of Chemashi
- Country: Russia
- District: Oktyabrsky District
- Rural settlement: Peregrebnoye Rural Settlement

Population (2010)
  - Total: 417
- Time zone: Yekaterinburg Time
- Postal code: 628109

Chemashi is a village in the Oktyabrsky District of the Khanty-Mansi Autonomous Okrug – Yugra in Russia. It is part of the Peregrebnoye rural settlement.

== Climate ==
The climate is sharply continental, with harsh winters, strong winds and snowstorms, lasting seven months. Summers are relatively warm but short-lived.

== Infrastructure ==
The village features nine officially registered streets, one school with an adjacent medical clinic, and the nearby Peschany Island.

== Population ==
The village had a population of 658 in 1989, which later decreased to 504 in 2002 and 417 by 2010.
