= Verkhnerubezhny =

Verkhnerubezhny Верхнерубежный
- Khutor
- Location within Volgograd Oblast Location within Russia
- Coordinates: 48°15′N 43°09′E
- Country: Russia
- Region: Volgograd Oblast
- District: Oktyabrsky District
- Time zone: UTC+4:00

Verkhnerubezhny (Russian: Верхнерубежный) is a rural locality (a khutor) in Ilmenskoye Rural Settlement, Oktyabrsky District, Volgograd Oblast, Russia. The population was 243 as of 2010. There are 4 streets.

== Geography ==
Verkhnerubezhny is located on Yergeni, 67 km northwest of Oktyabrsky (the district's administrative centre) by road. Ilmen-Suvorovsky is the nearest rural locality.
