= Tikhy, Volgograd Oblast =

Tikhy Тихий
- Settlement
- Location within Volgograd Oblast Location within Russia
- Coordinates: 48°01′N 43°51′E
- Country: Russia
- Region: Volgograd Oblast
- District: Oktyabrsky District
- Time zone: UTC+4:00

Tikhy (Russian: Тихий) is a rural locality (a settlement) in Aksayskoye Rural Settlement, Oktyabrsky District, Volgograd Oblast, Russia. The population was 38 as of 2010.

== Geography ==
Tikhy is located 42 km northeast of Oktyabrsky (the district's administrative centre) by road. Kamenka is the nearest rural locality.
