= Novoromashkin =

Novoromashkin Новоромашкин
- Khutor
- Location within Volgograd Oblast Location within Russia
- Coordinates: 48°02′N 43°10′E
- Country: Russia
- Region: Volgograd Oblast
- District: Oktyabrsky District
- Time zone: UTC+4:00

Novoromashkin (Russian: Новоромашкин) is a rural locality (a khutor) in Novoaksayskoye Rural Settlement, Oktyabrsky District, Volgograd Oblast, Russia. The population was 16 as of 2010. There are 3 streets.

== Geography ==
Novoromashkin is located on the north bank of the Tsimlyansk Reservoir, 93 km northwest of Oktyabrsky (the district's administrative centre) by road. Pugachyovskaya is the nearest rural locality.
