= Peregruznoye =

Peregruznoye Перегрузное
- Selo
- Location within Volgograd Oblast Location within Russia
- Coordinates: 47°53′N 43°59′E
- Country: Russia
- Region: Volgograd Oblast
- District: Oktyabrsky District
- Time zone: UTC+4:00

Peregruznoye (Russian: Перегрузное) is a rural locality (a selo) and the administrative center of Peregruznenskoye Rural Settlement, Oktyabrsky District, Volgograd Oblast, Russia. The population was 674 as of 2010. There are 4 streets.

== Geography ==
Peregruznoye is located in steppe, on Yergeni, on the left bank of the Rossosh River, 32 km east of Oktyabrsky (the district's administrative centre) by road. Aksay is the nearest rural locality.
