= Chernomorovsky =

Chernomorovsky Черноморовский
- Khutor
- Location within Volgograd Oblast Location within Russia
- Coordinates: 48°14′N 43°25′E
- Country: Russia
- Region: Volgograd Oblast
- District: Oktyabrsky District
- Time zone: UTC+4:00

Chernomorovsky (Russian: Черноморовский) is a rural locality (a khutor) in Shebalinovskoye Rural Settlement, Oktyabrsky District, Volgograd Oblast, Russia. The population was 174 as of 2010. There are 4 streets.

== Geography ==
Chernomorovsky is located on the Myshkova River, 44 km (27 mi) northwest of Oktyabrsky (the district's administrative centre) by road. Shebalino is the nearest rural locality.
