= Goncharovka, Volgograd Oblast =

Goncharovka Гончаровка
- Selo
- Location within Volgograd Oblast Location within Russia
- Coordinates: 48°00′N 44°04′E
- Country: Russia
- Region: Volgograd Oblast
- District: Oktyabrsky District
- Time zone: UTC+4:00

Goncharovka (Russian: Гончаровка) is a rural locality (a selo) in Shelestovskoye Rural Settlement, Oktyabrsky District, Volgograd Oblast, Russia. The population was 246 as of 2010. There are 5 streets.

== Geography ==
Goncharovka is located on the Aksay Yesaulovsky River, 42 km northeast of Oktyabrsky (the district's administrative centre) by road. Shelestovo is the nearest rural locality.
