= Shchuchye Ozero =

Shchuchye Ozero Щучье Озеро
- Settlement
- Location within Perm Krai Location within Russia
- Coordinates: 56°28′N 56°38′E
- Country: Russia
- Region: Perm Krai
- District: Oktyabrsky District
- Time zone: UTC+5:00

Shchuchye Ozero (Russian: Щучье Озеро) is a rural locality (a settlement) and the administrative center of Shchuchye Ozerskoye Rural Settlement, Oktyabrsky District, Perm Krai, Russia. The population was 1,652 as of 2010. There are 28 streets.

== Geography ==
Shchuchye Ozero is located 46 km west of Oktyabrsky (the district's administrative centre) by road. Melnikovsky is the nearest rural locality.
