= Sovetsky, Volgograd Oblast =

Sovetsky Советский
- Settlement
- Location within Volgograd Oblast Location within Russia
- Coordinates: 48°05′N 43°31′E
- Country: Russia
- Region: Volgograd Oblast
- District: Oktyabrsky District
- Time zone: UTC+4:00

Sovetsky (Russian: Советский) is a rural locality (a settlement) and the administrative center of Sovetskoye Rural Settlement, Oktyabrsky District, Volgograd Oblast, Russia. The population was 280 as of 2010. There are 12 streets.

== Geography ==
The village is located in steppe, on Yergeni, 21 km northwest of Oktyabrsky.
