= Zhutovo 2-ye =

Zhutovo 2-ye Жутово 2-е
- Selo
- Location within Volgograd Oblast Location within Russia
- Coordinates: 47°48′N 43°51′E
- Country: Russia
- Region: Volgograd Oblast
- District: Oktyabrsky District
- Time zone: UTC+4:00

Zhutovo 2-ye (Russian: Жутово 2-е) is a rural locality (a selo) and the administrative center of Zhutovskoye Rural Settlement, Oktyabrsky District, Volgograd Oblast, Russia. The population was 754 as of 2010 census. There are 10 streets.

== Geography ==
Zhutovo 2-ye is located in steppe, on Yergeni, 37 km southeast of Oktyabrsky (the district's administrative centre) by road. Samokhino is the nearest rural locality.
