= Zalivsky =

Zalivsky Заливский
- Khutor
- Location within Volgograd Oblast Location within Russia
- Coordinates: 47°58′N 43°27′E
- Country: Russia
- Region: Volgograd Oblast
- District: Oktyabrsky District
- Time zone: UTC+4:00

Zalivsky (Russian: Заливский) is a rural locality (a khutor) and the administrative center of Zalivskoye Rural Settlement, Oktyabrsky District, Volgograd Oblast, Russia. The population was 896 as of 2010. There are 14 streets.

== Geography ==
Zalivsky is located in steppe, on Yergeni, on the left bank of the Aksay Yesaulovsky River, 17 kilometers west of Oktyabrsky (the district's administrative centre) by road. Chikov is the nearest rural locality.
