= Antonov, Volgograd Oblast =

Antonov Антонов
- Khutor
- Location within Volgograd Oblast Location within Russia
- Coordinates: 47°58′N 43°37′E
- Country: Russia
- Region: Volgograd Oblast
- District: Oktyabrsky District
- Time zone: UTC+4:00

Antonov (Russian: Антонов) is a rural locality (a khutor) and the administrative center of Antonovskoye Rural Settlement, Oktyabrsky District, Volgograd Oblast, Russia. The population was 1,654 as of 2010. There are 34 streets.

== Geography ==
Antonov is located in Yergeny, on the Aksay Yesaulovsky River, 4 km northwest of Oktyabrsky (the district's administrative centre) by road. Oktyabrsky is the nearest rural locality.
