= Nizhnekumsky =

Nizhnekumsky Нижнекумский
- Khutor
- Location within Volgograd Oblast Location within Russia
- Coordinates: 48°12′N 43°29′E
- Country: Russia
- Region: Volgograd Oblast
- District: Oktyabrsky District
- Time zone: UTC+4:00

Nizhnekumsky (Russian: Нижнекумский) is a rural locality (a khutor) in Shebalinovskoye Rural Settlement, Oktyabrsky District, Volgograd Oblast, Russia. The population was 217 as of 2010. There are 4 streets.

== Geography ==
Nizhnekumsky is located in steppe, on Yergeni, on the left bank of the Myshkova River, 39 km northwest of Oktyabrsky (the district's administrative centre) by road. Chernomorovsky is the nearest rural locality.
