= Poludenovka =

Poludenovka (Russian: Полуденовка) is the name of several rural localities in Russia:

- Poludenovka, Moscow Oblast, a village in Tempovoye Rural Settlement of Taldomsky District of Moscow Oblast
- Poludenovka, Tomsk Oblast, a village in Verkhneketsky District of Tomsk Oblast
