= Aktsyabrski rural council =

Aktsyabrski rural council is a lower-level subdivision (selsoviet) of Salihorsk district, Minsk region, Belarus. Its administrative center is Aktsyabrski.
