= Gromoslavka =

Gromoslavka Громославка
- Selo
- Location within Volgograd Oblast Location within Russia
- Coordinates: 48°11′N 43°37′E
- Country: Russia
- Region: Volgograd Oblast
- District: Oktyabrsky District
- Time zone: UTC+4:00

Gromoslavka (Russian: Громославка) is a rural locality (a selo) and the administrative center of Gromoslavskoye Rural Settlement, Oktyabrsky District, Volgograd Oblast, Russia. The population was 582 as of 2010. There are 22 streets.

== Geography ==
Gromoslavka is located in steppe, on Yergeni, on the Myshkova River, 32 km north of Oktyabrsky (the district's administrative centre) by road. Ivanovka is the nearest rural locality.
