= Bely Yar, Verkhneketsky District, Tomsk Oblast =

Bely Yar Белый Яр
- Urban-type settlement
- Interactive map of Bely Yar
- Location of Bely Yar Bely Yar (Tomsk Oblast)
- Coordinates: 58.4396°N 85.0481°E
- Country: Russia
- Federal subject: Tomsk Oblast
- Administrative district: Verkhneketsky District
- Elevation: 83 m (272 ft)

Population (2010 Census)
  - Total: 7,996
  - Estimate (2021): 7,920 (−1%)
- Time zone: UTC+7 (MSK+4)
- Postal code: 636500
- OKTMO ID: 69616151051

Bely Yar (Russian: Белый Яр) is an urban locality (an urban-type settlement) in Verkhneketsky District of Tomsk Oblast, Russia. Population: 7,996 (2010 census); 8,221 (2002 census); 8,850 (1989 Soviet census).
