= 51st Rifle Corps =

- Allegiance: Soviet Union
- Branch: Soviet Red Army
- Engagements: Eastern Front (World War II); Operation Barbarossa

The 51st Rifle Corps was a corps of the Soviet Red Army. It was part of the 22nd Army. It took part in the Great Patriotic War.

== Organization ==
- 98th Rifle Division
- 112th Rifle Division
- 153rd Rifle Division

== Commanders ==
- Major General Markov, Akim Markovich (February 1941 - August 1941),
- Major General Avdeenko, Petr Petrovich (July 3, 1943 - May 28, 1944);
