= Pervomaysky Administrative Okrug =

Territorial division in northern Russia

Coordinates: 68.9228°N 33.1053°E

Pervomaysky Administrative Okrug (Russian: Первома́йский администрати́вный о́круг) is a territorial division of the City of Murmansk in Murmansk Oblast, Russia. Population: 121,357 (2010 Census); 133,551 (2002 Census); 176,373 (1989 Soviet census).

It was established on February 21, 1975 as Pervomaysky City District when its territory was split from Oktyabrsky City District. When the Charter of the Hero City of Murmansk was adopted on December 17, 1995, all city districts started to be referred to as administrative okrugs.
