= Srednetsaritsynsky =

Srednetsaritsynsky Среднецарицынский
- Khutor
- Location within Volgograd Oblast Location within Russia
- Coordinates: 49°20′N 42°33′E
- Country: Russia
- Region: Volgograd Oblast
- District: Serafimovichsky District
- Time zone: UTC+4:00

Srednetsaritsynsky (Russian: Среднецарицынский) is a rural locality (a khutor) and the administrative center of Srednetsaritsynskoye Rural Settlement, Serafimovichsky District, Volgograd Oblast, Russia. The population was 644 as of 2010. There are 19 streets.

== Geography ==
Srednetsaritsynsky is located 35 km southwest of Serafimovich (the district's administrative centre) by road. Karagichev is the nearest rural locality.
