= Peskovatka =

Peskovatka Песковатка
- Khutor
- Location within Volgograd Oblast Location within Russia
- Coordinates: 48°54′N 43°48′E
- Country: Russia
- Region: Volgograd Oblast
- District: Gorodishchensky District
- Time zone: UTC+4:00

Peskovatka (Russian: Песковатка) is a rural locality (a khutor) and the administrative center of Peskovatskoye Rural Settlement, Gorodishchensky District, Volgograd Oblast, Russia. The population was 1,093 as of 2010. There are 24 streets.

== Geography ==
Peskovatka is located in steppe, 69 km northwest of Gorodishche (the district's administrative centre) by road. Vertyachy is the nearest rural locality.
