= Aktsyabrski district =

District of Gomel region, Belarus

Aktsyabrski district Акцябрскі раён (Belarusian) Октябрьский район (Russian) Akciabrski district
- District
- Flag Coat of arms

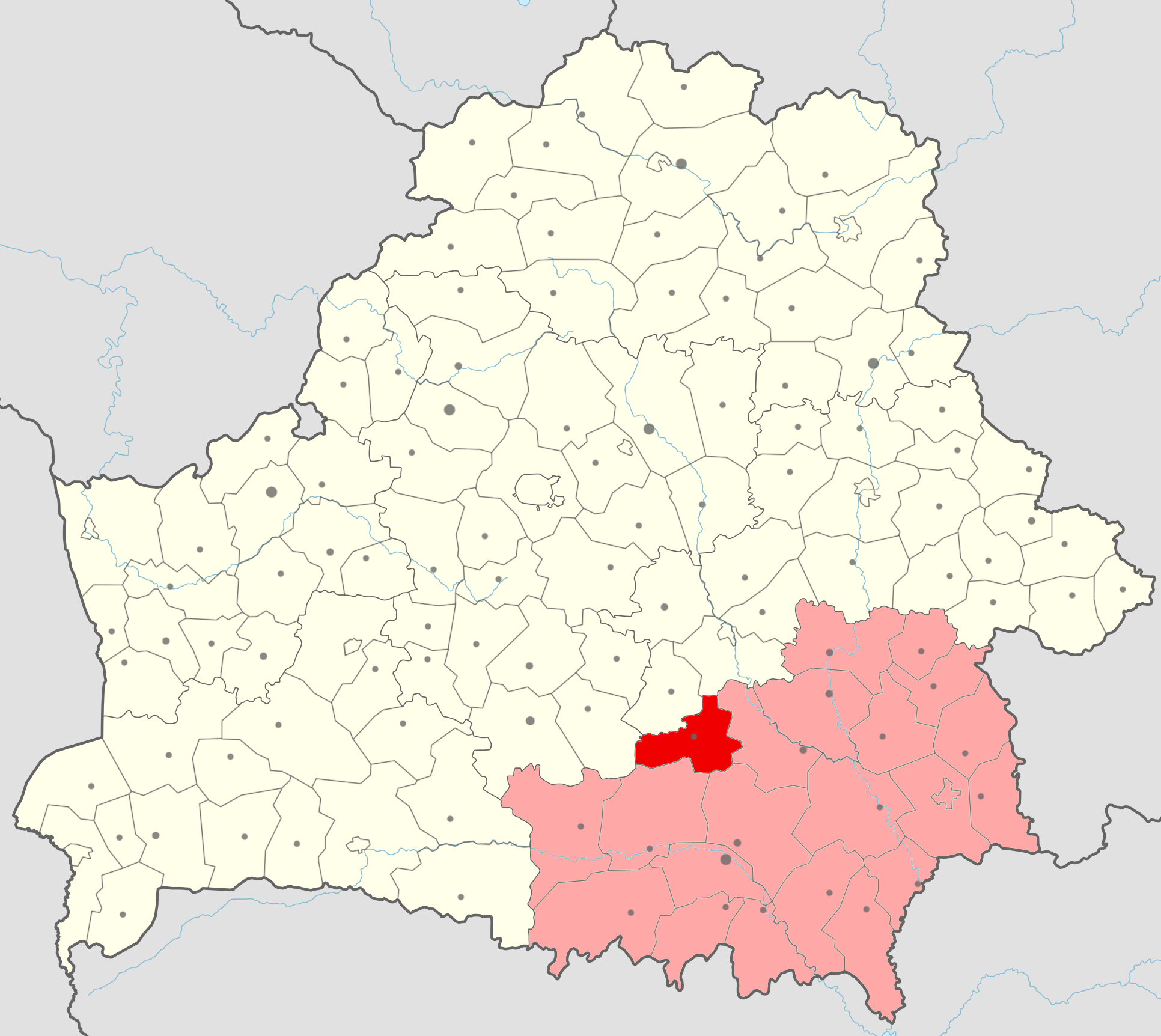
- Coordinates: 52°38′35″N 28°52′56″E
- Country: Belarus
- region: Gomel Region
- Administrative center: Aktsyabrski

Area
  - Total: 1,381.19 km^{2} (533.28 sq mi)

Population (2024)
  - Total: 12,896
  - Density: 9.3369/km^{2} (24.182/sq mi)
- Time zone: UTC+3 (MSK)

Aktsyabrski district or Akciabrski district (Belarusian: Акцябрскі раён, romanized: Akciabrski rajon; Russian: Октябрьский район) is a district (raion) of Gomel region in southern Belarus. Its administrative center is Aktsyabrski. As of 2024, it has a population of 12,896.

Its rural territory includes eight selsoviets (rural districts): Aktsyabrski (Акцябрскі), Valosavitski (Валосавіцкі), Lamavitski (Ламавіцкі), Lyubanski (Любанскі), Lyaskavitski (Ляскавіцкі), Paretski (Парэцкі), Pratasawski (Пратасаўскі), and Chyrvonaslabodski (Чырвонаслабодскі).

== Demographics ==
At the time of the 2009 Belarusian census, Aktsyabrski district had a population of 15,989. Of these, 95.1% were of Belarusian, 2.8% Russian and 1.0% Ukrainian ethnicity. 90.8% spoke Belarusian and 7.6% Russian as their native language. In 2023, it had a total population of 13,208.
