= Verkhneketsky District =

Verkhneketsky District Верхнекетский район (Russian)
- District
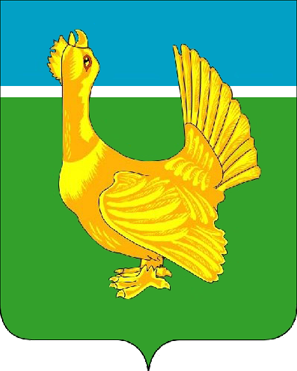
- Coat of arms
- Location of Verkhneketsky District in Tomsk Oblast
- Coordinates: 58°26′22″N 85°03′10″E
- Country: Russia
- Federal subject: Tomsk Oblast
- Established: June 1939
- Administrative center: Bely Yar

Area
  - Total: 43,348.9 km^{2} (16,737.1 sq mi)

Population (2010 Census)
  - Total: 17,052
  - Density: 0.39337/km^{2} (1.0188/sq mi)
  - Urban: 46.9%
  - Rural: 53.1%

Administrative structure
  - Inhabited localities: 1 urban-type settlements, 18 rural localities

Municipal structure
  - Municipally incorporated as: Verkhneketsky Municipal District
  - Municipal divisions: 1 urban settlements, 8 rural settlements
- Time zone: UTC+7 (MSK+4)
- OKTMO ID: 69616000
- Website: http://vkt.tomsk.ru/

Verkhneketsky District (Russian: Верхнеке́тский райо́н) is an administrative and municipal district (raion), one of the sixteen in Tomsk Oblast, Russia. It is located in the northeast of the oblast. The area of the district is 43,348.9 square kilometers (16,737.1 sq mi). Its administrative center is the urban locality (a work settlement) of Bely Yar. Population: 17,052 (2010 Census); 18,300 (2002 census); 25,127 (1989 Soviet census). The population of Bely Yar accounts for 46.9% of the district's total population.
