= Oktyabrsky City District, Tomsk =

Urban district in Tomsk, Russia

Oktyabrsky District Октябрьский район
- District
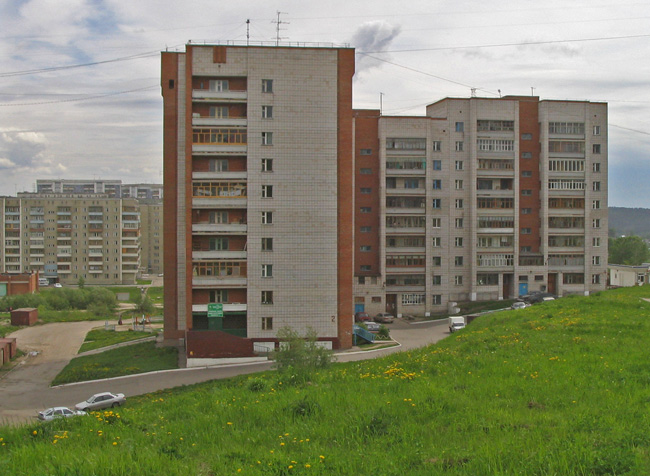
- Solnechny Microdistrict on the southern part of the district

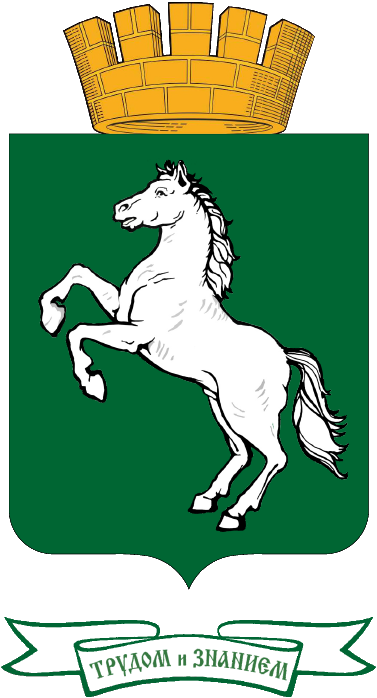
- Coat of arms

- Location within Tomsk Oblast Location within Russia
- Coordinates: 56°30′17″N 85°00′51″E
- Country: Russia
- Federal subject: Tomsk
- City: Tomsk
- Foundation: November 29, 1979

Area
  - Total: 126 km^{2} (49 sq mi)
- Elevation: 157 m (515 ft)

Population (2021)
  - Total: 181,422
  - Density: 1,440/km^{2} (3,730/sq mi)
- Time zone: UTC+7 (KRAT)
- Postal code: 634xxx
- Telephone code: +7 3822

Oktyabrsky District is one of the four urban districts of Tomsk, Tomsk Oblast, Russia. It is the largest district of Tomsk by land area, occupying 126 square kilometers of land on the northeast of the city. As of the year 2021, its total population is 181,422.

The district was named after the October Revolution (Russian: Октябрьская революция, romanized: Oktyabr'skaya revolyutsiya)

== Geography ==
Oktyabrsky District is located in the northeastern and mountainous portion of Tomsk. It is bounded by the Tomsk Special Economic Zone to the north, forests of the Tomsk Oblast to the east, Sovetsky District to the south, as well as Leninsky District and Seversk to the west.

== History ==
From 1938 to 1959, this region was part of the Vokzalny District. Oktyabrsky District was formed on November 29, 1979, through the decision of the Tomsk Regional Executive Committee and the Decree of the Presidium of the Supreme Soviet of the RSFSR.

On January 18, 1994, by a decree of the head of the administration of Tomsk, the Oktyabrsky District was incorporated into the city of Tomsk.

In accordance with the Charter of Tomsk and the resolution of the Mayor of Tomsk on May 28, 1997, all districts of the city were reformed into Okrugs.

By the Decree of the Mayor of Tomsk on March 11, 1998, the Leninsky and Oktyabrsky Okrugs were merged into a new district named Northern Okrug.

On January 1, 2006, in accordance with the new city charter, the Northern Okrug was divided into two district, with the two former districts of Leninsky and Oktyabrsky being fully restored.

== Population ==
Historical population
Year	Pop.	±%
1989	141,091	—
2002	147,051	+4.2%
2009	153,098	+4.1%
2010	159,157	+4.0%
2012	163,565	+2.8%
2013	166,922	+2.1%
2014	170,522	+2.2%
2015	174,426	+2.3%
2016	177,320	+1.7%
2017	179,268	+1.1%
2018	181,228	+1.1%
2019	183,762	+1.4%
2020	184,711	+0.5%
2021	181,422	−1.8%
