= Oktyabrsky (surname) =

Oktyabrsky or Oktyabrskiy (Russian: Октябрьский) is a Russian masculine surname, its feminine counterpart is Oktyabrskaya or Oktyabrskaia (Октябрьская). It means "of October" and often refers the October Revolution of November 1917. The surname may refer to:

- Filipp Oktyabrsky (1899–1969), Soviet admiral
  - Soviet cruiser Admiral Oktyabrsky
- Mariya Oktyabrskaya (1905–1944), Soviet tank driver
