= Aktsyabrski =

Aktsyabrski Акцябрскі (Belarusian)
- Urban-type settlement
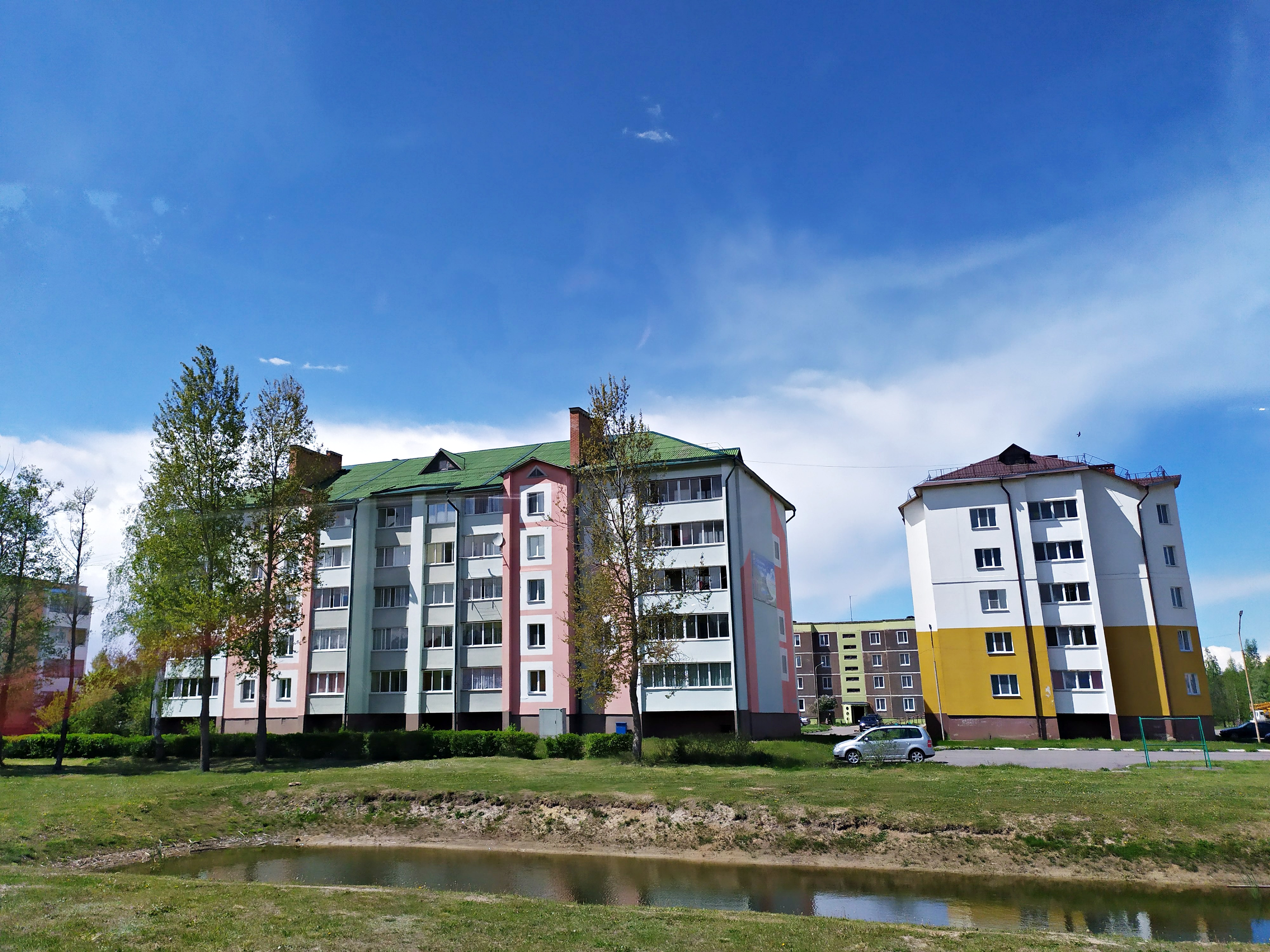

- Flag Seal

- Location within Belarus
- Coordinates: 52°38′50″N 28°53′0″E
- Country: Belarus
- Region: Gomel Region
- District: Aktsyabrski District
- Created: 1954

Population (2025)
  - Total: 7,167
- Time zone: UTC+3 (MSK)
- Postal code: 247300
- Area code: +375-2357

Aktsyabrski (Belarusian: Акцябрскі, romanized: Akciabrski; Russian: Октябрьский, romanized: Oktyabrsky; Polish: Oktiabrski, Rudobiełka) is an urban-type settlement in Gomel Region, in southern Belarus. It serves as the administrative center of Aktsyabrski District. As of 2025, it has a population of 7,167.

== History ==
Rudobiełka was a royal village, administratively located in the Mozyrz County in the Mińsk Voivodeship of the Polish–Lithuanian Commonwealth. In 1661, it was granted to Aleksander Hilary Połubiński in reward for his merits in defending Poland during the Swedish invasion, and later passed to the Łappa family. Dominik Łappa drained the surrounding marshes with a new drainage system, raising the fertility of the soil. Following the Second Partition of Poland in 1793, the village passed to Russia. In 1874, the Łapp family was forced to sell the estate to Baron Lilienfeld.

It was established by a decree of August 31, 1954, by merging three adjacent settlements: Rudabelka (Belarusian: Рудабелка), Rudnya (Рудня), and Karpilawka (Карпілаўка), replacing Karpilawka as the administrative center.

== Climate ==
Climate data for Aktsyabrski (1991–2020)
Month	Jan	Feb	Mar	Apr	May	Jun	Jul	Aug	Sep	Oct	Nov	Dec	Year
Record high °C (°F)	5.1 (41.2)	6.9 (44.4)	14.7 (58.5)	23.5 (74.3)	28.5 (83.3)	31.4 (88.5)	32.3 (90.1)	32.3 (90.1)	27.0 (80.6)	21.2 (70.2)	12.5 (54.5)	6.8 (44.2)	32.3 (90.1)
Mean daily maximum °C (°F)	−1.5 (29.3)	0.0 (32.0)	5.6 (42.1)	14.2 (57.6)	20.3 (68.5)	23.8 (74.8)	25.6 (78.1)	24.8 (76.6)	18.8 (65.8)	11.7 (53.1)	4.3 (39.7)	−0.2 (31.6)	12.3 (54.1)
Daily mean °C (°F)	−4.0 (24.8)	−3.2 (26.2)	1.2 (34.2)	8.3 (46.9)	14.1 (57.4)	17.8 (64.0)	19.5 (67.1)	18.4 (65.1)	13.0 (55.4)	7.1 (44.8)	1.7 (35.1)	−2.5 (27.5)	7.6 (45.7)
Mean daily minimum °C (°F)	−6.4 (20.5)	−6.1 (21.0)	−2.6 (27.3)	2.9 (37.2)	8.0 (46.4)	11.7 (53.1)	13.7 (56.7)	12.4 (54.3)	7.9 (46.2)	3.3 (37.9)	−0.6 (30.9)	−4.8 (23.4)	3.3 (37.9)
Record low °C (°F)	−20.4 (−4.7)	−18.1 (−0.6)	−11.6 (11.1)	−4.6 (23.7)	0.3 (32.5)	4.6 (40.3)	8.3 (46.9)	5.7 (42.3)	−0.3 (31.5)	−5.4 (22.3)	−10.3 (13.5)	−15.9 (3.4)	−20.4 (−4.7)
Average precipitation mm (inches)	37.1 (1.46)	37.5 (1.48)	40.8 (1.61)	38.5 (1.52)	64.1 (2.52)	73.2 (2.88)	100.6 (3.96)	60.8 (2.39)	51.5 (2.03)	53.9 (2.12)	45.8 (1.80)	44.1 (1.74)	647.9 (25.51)
Average precipitation days (≥ 1.0 mm)	10.1	9.3	8.9	7.5	9.7	9.8	10.8	7.7	8.3	8.5	9.1	10.4	110.1
Source: NOAA
