= Oktyabrsky Okrug =

Oktyabrsky Okrug may refer to:

City divisions

- Oktyabrsky Okrug, Kaluga, a division of the city of Kaluga, Russia
- Oktyabrsky Administrative Okrug, Murmansk, a division of the city of Murmansk, Russia
- Oktyabrsky Administrative Okrug, Omsk, a division of the city of Omsk, Russia
- Oktyabrsky Territorial Okrug, Arkhangelsk, a division of the city of Arkhangelsk, Russia
- Oktyabrsky Territorial Okrug, Lipetsk, a division of the city of Lipetsk, Russia

Municipal formations

- Oktyabrsky Urban Okrug, a municipal formation which the city of republic significance of Oktyabrsky in the Republic of Bashkortostan, Russia is incorporated as
