= Oktyabrsky Administrative Okrug, Murmansk =

Coordinates: 68°58′30″N 33°10′53″E

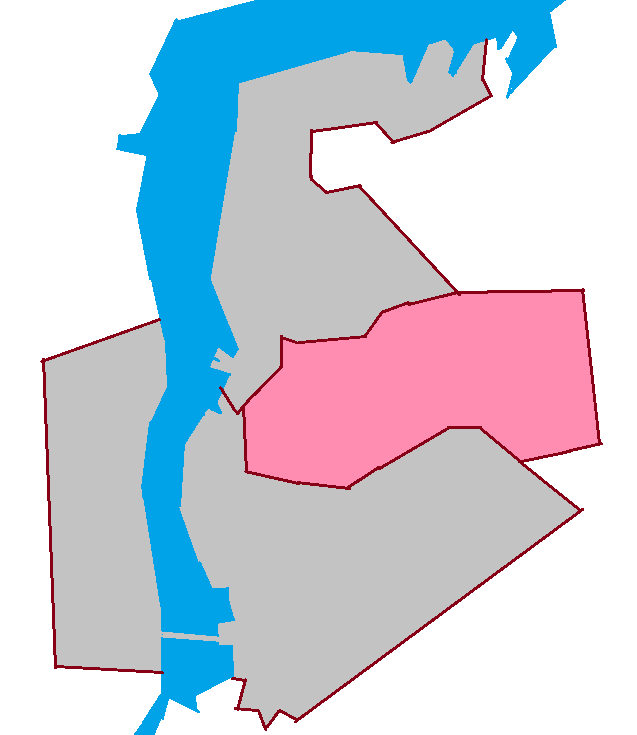
Oktyabrsky District of Murmansk

Oktyabrsky Administrative Okrug (Russian: Октя́брьский администрати́вный о́круг) is a territorial division of the City of Murmansk in Murmansk Oblast, Russia. Population: 95,569 (2010 census); 104,831 (2002 census); 144,431 (1989 Soviet census).

== History ==
It was established for the first time by the Decree of the Presidium of the Supreme Soviet of the Russian SFSR of April 20, 1939, as Mikoyanovsky City District (Микоя́новский райо́н) and abolished together with the other two city districts on June 2, 1948. All three city districts, including Mikoyanovsky, were created again on June 23, 1951.

The work settlement of Nagornovsky and its settlement soviet were transferred from Kolsky District to the administrative jurisdiction of Murmansk City Soviet by the Decree of the Presidium of the Supreme Soviet of the Russian SFSR of August 5, 1953.

By the Decision of Murmansk Executive Committee of December 30, 1953, Nagornovsky Settlement Soviet with the administrative center in the work settlement of Nagornovsky, which was previously transferred to jurisdiction of Murmansk from Kolsky District by the Decree of the Presidium of the Supreme Soviet of the Russian SFSR of August 5, 1953, was subordinated to Mikoyanovsky City District.

On October 30, 1957, Mikoyanovsky City District was renamed Oktyabrsky, but on September 30, 1958 all city districts of Murmansk were again abolished. On June 10, 1957, two city districts were created in Murmansk, including a larger Oktyabrsky District. On February 21, 1975, Pervomaysky City District was split from Oktyabrsky City District. When the Charter of the Hero City of Murmansk was adopted on December 17, 1995, all city districts started to be referred to as administrative okrugs.
