= Oktyabrsky, Oktyabrsky District, Perm Krai =

Oktyabrsky Октябрьский
- Work settlement
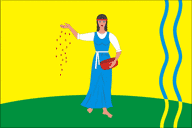
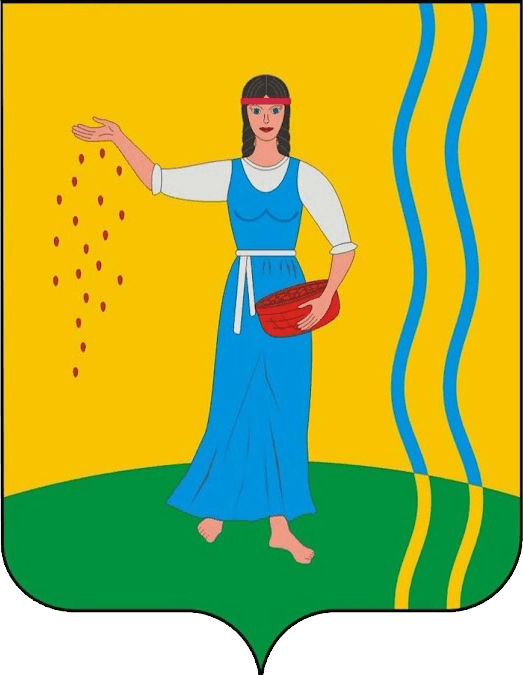
- Flag Coat of arms
- Interactive map of Oktyabrsky
- Location of Oktyabrsky Oktyabrsky (Perm Krai)
- Coordinates: 56°30′45″N 57°12′18″E
- Country: Russia
- Federal subject: Perm Krai
- Founded: 1887

Population (2010 Census)
  - Total: 9,845
  - Estimate (2023): 8,990 (−8.7%)

Administrative status
  - Subordinated to: Oktyabrsky District
- Time zone: UTC+5 (MSK+2)
- OKTMO ID: 57636151051

Oktyabrsky (Russian: Октя́брьский) is an urban locality (a work settlement) and the administrative center of Oktyabrsky District of Perm Krai, Russia. Population: 9,845 (2010 census); 10,039 (2002 census); 8,961 (1989 Soviet census).
