= Oktyabrsky District, Perm Krai =

Oktyabrsky District Октябрьский район (Russian)
- District
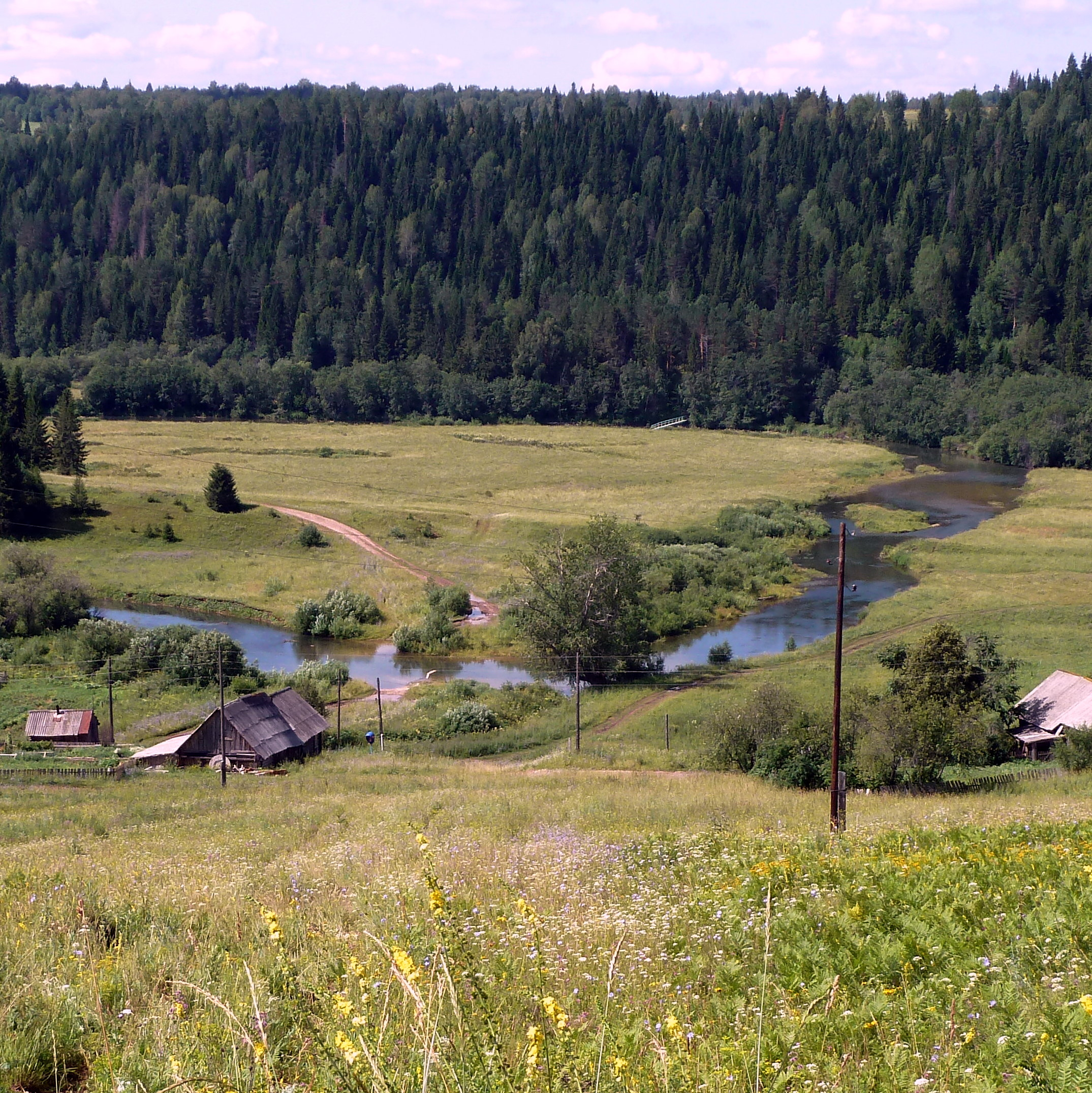
- Sars River, Oktyabrsky District

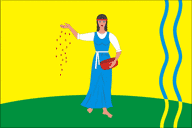
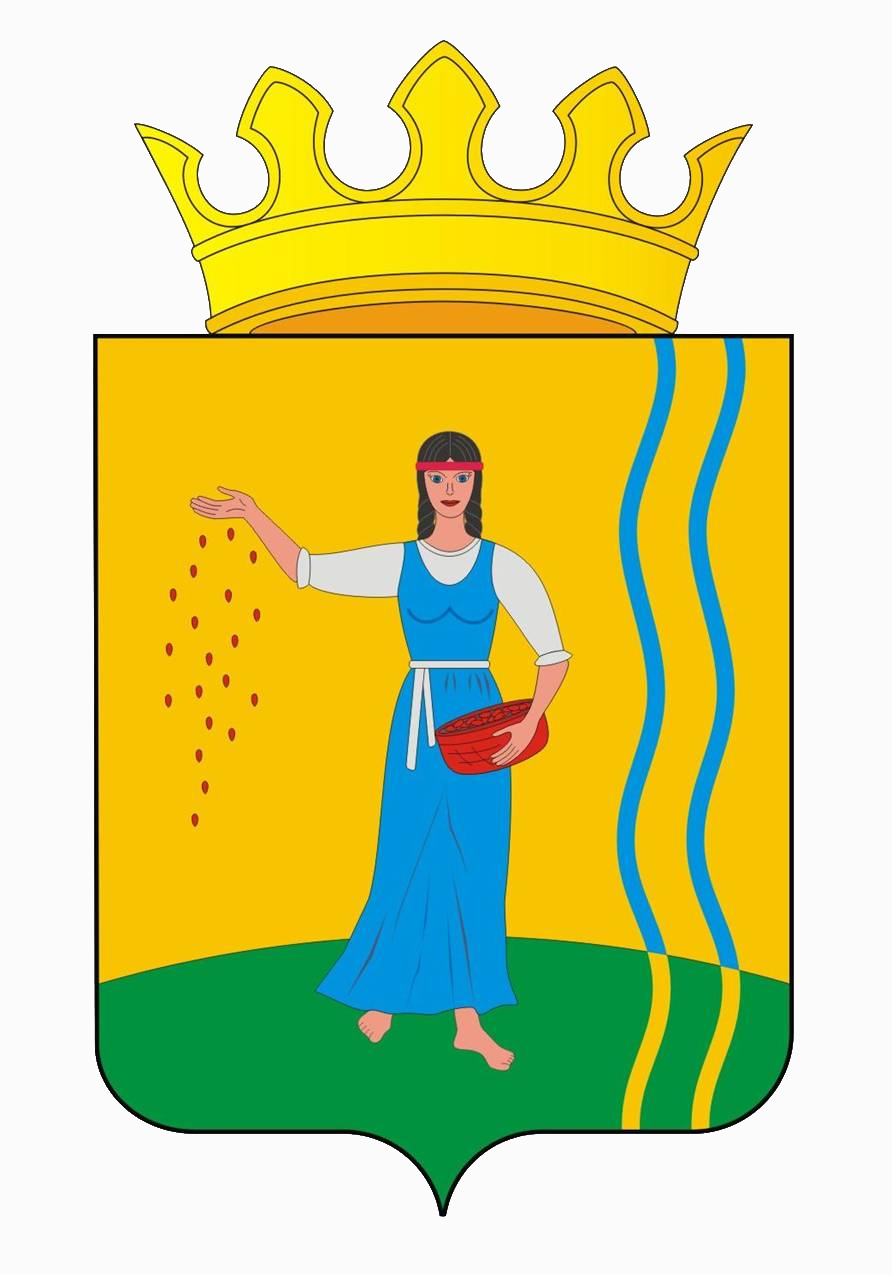
- Flag Coat of arms
- Location of Oktyabrsky District in Perm Krai
- Coordinates: 56.519°N 57.214°E
- Country: Russia
- Federal subject: Perm Krai
- Established: June 10, 1931
- Administrative center: Oktyabrsky

Area
  - Total: 3,444 km^{2} (1,330 sq mi)

Population (2010 Census)
  - Total: 30,441
  - Density: 8.839/km^{2} (22.89/sq mi)
  - Urban: 48.9%
  - Rural: 51.1%

Administrative structure
  - Inhabited localities: 2 urban-type settlements, 82 rural localities

Municipal structure
  - Municipally incorporated as: Oktyabrsky Municipal District
  - Municipal divisions: 2 urban settlements, 11 rural settlements
- Time zone: UTC+5 (MSK+2)
- OKTMO ID: 57761000
- Website: http://oktyabrskiy.perm.ru/

Oktyabrsky District (Russian: Октя́брьский райо́н) is an administrative district (raion) of Perm Krai, Russia; one of the thirty-three in the krai. Municipally, it is incorporated as Oktyabrsky Municipal District. It is located in the southeast of the krai. The area of the district is 3,444 square kilometers (1,330 sq mi). Its administrative center is the urban locality (a work settlement) of Oktyabrsky. Population: 30,441 (2010 census); 36,463 (2002 census); 39,253 (1989 Soviet census). The population of the administrative center accounts for 32.3% of the district's total population.

== History ==
It was established on July 10, 1931 as Schuchye-Ozyorsky District (Щучье-Озёрский район), by merging Almazovsky and Bogorodsky Districts of Ural Oblast. It was given its present name on July 15, 1960. On February 1, 1963, the district was its territory was merged into Chernushinsky District, but on January 12, 1965 it was restored.

== Demographics ==
Ethnic composition:

- Russians: 59.6%
- Tatars: 34.7%
- Bashkirs: 2.3%
