= Oktyabrsky, Oktyabrsky District, Volgograd Oblast =

Urban locality in Volgograd Oblast, Russia

Oktyabrsky Октябрьский
- Work settlement
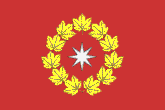
- Flag
- Interactive map of Oktyabrsky
- Location of Oktyabrsky Oktyabrsky (Volgograd Oblast)
- Coordinates: 47°58′00″N 43°38′37″E
- Country: Russia
- Federal subject: Volgograd Oblast
- Founded: 1897
- Elevation: 53 m (174 ft)

Population (2010 Census)
  - Total: 6,157
  - Estimate (2021): 6,071 (−1.4%)

Administrative status
  - Subordinated to: Oktyabrsky District
- Time zone: UTC+3 (MSK)
- Postal code: 404321
- OKTMO ID: 18642151051

Oktyabrsky (Russian: Октябрьский) is an urban locality (a work settlement) and the administrative center of Oktyabrsky District in Volgograd Oblast, Russia. Population: 6,157 (2010 census); 6,863 (2002 census); 6,761 (1989 Soviet census).
