= Oktyabrsky District, Volgograd Oblast =

Oktyabrsky District Октябрьский район (Russian)
- District
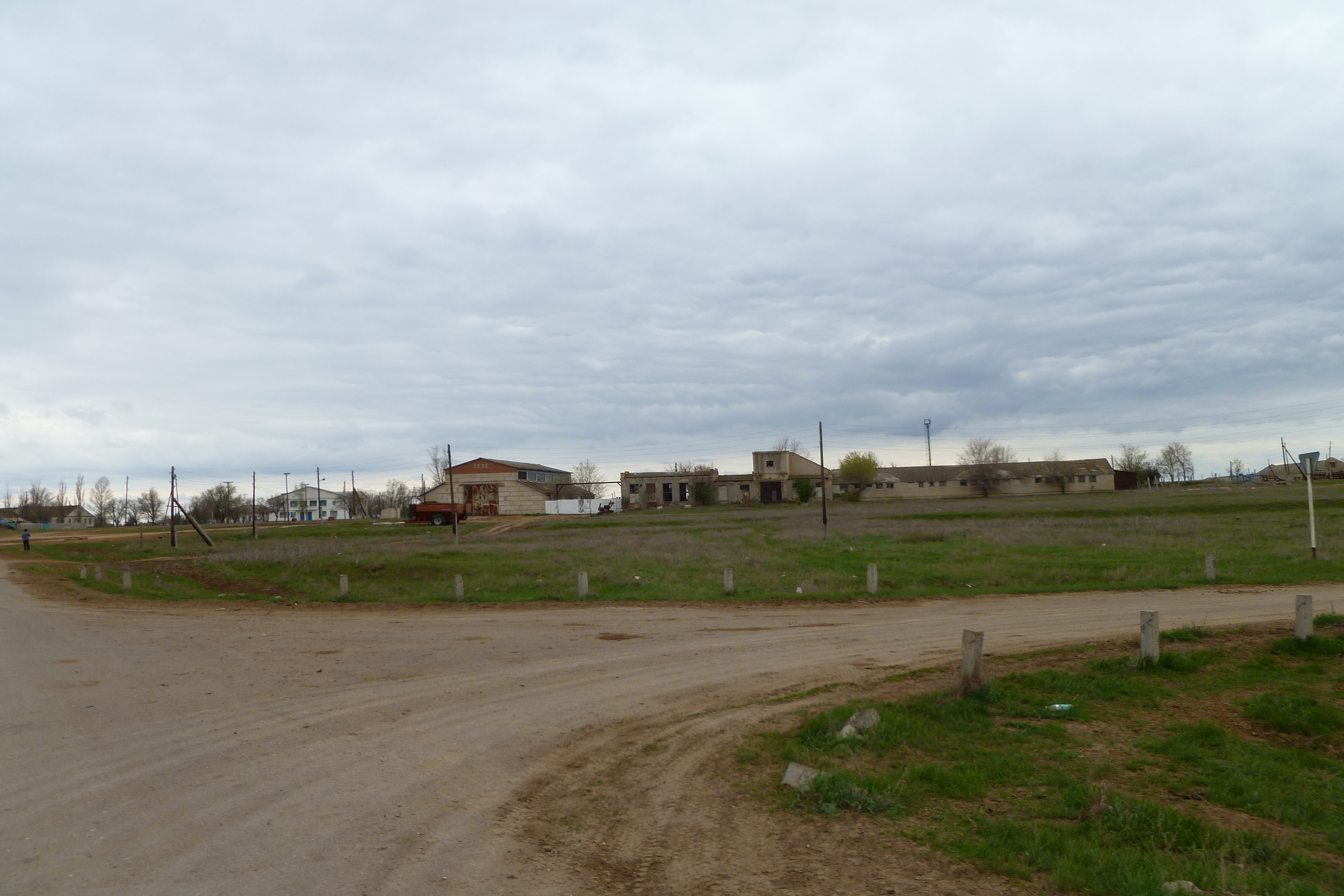
- Village in Oktyabrsky District

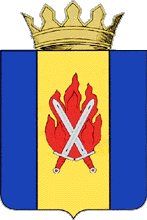
- Coat of arms
- Location of Oktyabrsky District in Volgograd Oblast
- Coordinates: 47°58′00″N 43°38′37″E
- Country: Russia
- Federal subject: Volgograd Oblast
- Established: 1937
- Administrative center: Oktyabrsky

Area
  - Total: 3,740 km^{2} (1,440 sq mi)

Population (2010 Census)
  - Total: 21,760
  - Density: 5.82/km^{2} (15.1/sq mi)
  - Urban: 28.3%
  - Rural: 71.7%

Administrative structure
  - Administrative divisions: 1 Urban-type settlements, 15 Selsoviets
  - Inhabited localities: 1 urban-type settlements, 30 rural localities

Municipal structure
  - Municipally incorporated as: Oktyabrsky Municipal District
  - Municipal divisions: 1 urban settlements, 15 rural settlements
- Time zone: UTC+3 (MSK)
- OKTMO ID: 18642000

Oktyabrsky District (Russian: Октя́брьский райо́н) is an administrative district (raion), one of the thirty-three in Volgograd Oblast, Russia. As a municipal division, it is incorporated as Oktyabrsky Municipal District. It is located in the south of the oblast. The area of the district is 3,740 square kilometers (1,440 sq mi). Its administrative center is the urban locality (a work settlement) of Oktyabrsky. Population: 21,760 (2010 census); 24,348 (2002 Census); 25,315 (1989 Soviet census). The population of the administrative center accounts for 28.3% of the district's total population.

== Geography ==
The district is located south of the oblast, in the area of the Yergeni hills.
