= 233rd Rifle Division =

233rd Rifle Division (March 14, 1941 - September 19, 1941) 233rd Rifle Division (April 1942 - October 1945)
- Active: 1941–1945
- Country: Soviet Union
- Branch: Red Army
- Type: Infantry
- Size: Division
- Engagements: Operation Barbarossa; Battle of Smolensk (1941); Battle of Stalingrad; Kotluban Offensives; Operation Uranus; Operation Ring; Belgorod–Kharkov offensive operation Chernigov-Poltava Strategic Offensive; Battle of the Dniepr; Kremenchug-Pyatikhatki Offensive; Kirovograd offensive Uman–Botoșani offensive First Jassy–Kishinev offensive Second Jassy–Kishinev offensive Belgrade offensive Battle of Batina; Operation Konrad III; Operation Spring Awakening; Vienna offensive
- Decorations: Order of the Red Banner (2nd formation)
- Battle honours: Kremenchuk (2nd formation); Znamianka (2nd formation)

Commanders
- Notable commanders: Col. Georgii Fyodorovich Kotov; Col. Gennadii Petrovich Pankov; Maj. Gen. Yosif Fyodorovich Barinov; Col. Yakov Nikiforovich Vronskii; Col. Yuri Ivanovich Sokolov; Col. Ivan Mikhailovich Vodopyanov; Col. Dmitrii Ilich Taranov; Col. Timofei Ilich Sidorenko; Maj. Gen. Fyodor Pavlovich Berezhnov

The 233rd Rifle Division was an infantry division of the Red Army, originally formed in the months just before the start of the German invasion, based on the shtat (table of organization and equipment) of September 13, 1939. As part of 20th Army it was moved from the Moscow Military District to the front west of Orsha by July 2. Serving under Western Front the 20th was soon pocketed in the Smolensk region and although remnants of the 233rd were able to escape the division was no longer combat-effective and was broken up for replacements in early August.

A new 233rd began forming between February and May 1942 in the Ural Military District, based on a rifle brigade, and largely from Azerbaijani nationals. After a fairly lengthy forming-up period near Moscow was sent south in August, eventually to Stalingrad Front, where it took part in the futile efforts to break through the German corridor to the city. After the Axis forces there were encircled the division fought as part of 65th Army into the factory district during Operation Koltso. Following the liquidation of the pocket it was moved north, eventually joining the 53rd Army of Steppe Front. Under these commands the 233rd advanced through eastern Ukraine to the Dniepr and won two battle honors in the fighting on both banks of the river, mostly as part of 75th Rifle Corps. In February 1944 it moved with its Corps to 4th Guards Army, in 2nd Ukrainian Front, serving under those commands during the first failed offensive into Moldavia. When the advance resumed in late August it was still with 75th Corps, now in 57th Army of 3rd Ukrainian Front, and took part in the operations that captured Bucharest and Belgrade. The division won the Order of the Red Banner for successfully crossing the Danube at Batina, but took heavy losses in fighting south of the Drava River in late December. During 1945 the 233rd helped defend against the German efforts to break the siege of Budapest and then advanced across Hungary into Austria as part of the 135th Rifle Corps in 26th Army. It was disbanded in the Balkans in October.

== 1st Formation ==
The division began forming on March 14, 1941, at Zvenigorod in the Moscow Military District. When completed it had the following order of battle:

- 703rd Rifle Regiment
- 724th Rifle Regiment
- 734th Rifle Regiment
- 684th Light Artillery Regiment
- 681st Howitzer Artillery Regiment
- 68th Antitank Battalion
- 429th Antiaircraft Battalion
- 275th Reconnaissance Battalion
- 384th Sapper Battalion
- 577th Signal Battalion
- 383rd Medical/Sanitation Battalion
- 328th Chemical Defense (Anti-gas) Company
- 298th Motor Transport Battalion
- 451st Field Bakery
- 675th Field Postal Station
- 545th Field Office of the State Bank

Col. Georgii Fyodorovich Kotov was appointed to command the division on the day it began forming and would lead it for the duration of the 1st formation. The 229th Rifle Division began forming the same day, also in the Moscow District, and the two could be considered "sister" divisions, sharing much the same combat path until the 233rd was disbanded.

=== Battle of Smolensk ===
On June 22 the 233rd was assigned to the 69th Rifle Corps, as part of 20th Army, in the Reserve of the Supreme High Command, and on July 1 it was still under this Corps and Army, officially joining the fighting front the following day to the west of Smolensk. At this time the Army was under the command of Lt. Gen. P. A. Kurochkin and the Corps also contained the 229th and 153rd Rifle Divisions. 20th Army was now part of the Group of Reserve Armies which had been assigned to Western Front and it had been ordered to prepare defenses along a sector on the approaches to Orsha. The Front was now under command of Marshal S. K. Timoshenko; he quickly assigned the 5th and 7th Mechanized Corps, with a total of over 1,500 tanks, to the support of the Army. It was more or less in place on July 2 when it was struck by elements of German 4th Army. By the end of July 5 the 233rd and 153rd were dug in in the Syanno region and were offering stiff resistance to the XXXIX Motorized Corps, imposing significant delays in difficult terrain south of the Western Dvina River, particularly against 7th Panzer Division.

At 0030 hours on July 5, as directed by Timoshenko, General Kurochkin ordered his Army to "prepare and conduct an attack against the flank and rear of the enemy grouping operating along the Polotsk axis." 7th Mechanized was to attack toward Beshankovichy and Lyepyel at 0600 hours and 69th Corps was to be prepared to follow. This counterblow effectively came to nothing apart heavy losses in tanks. By 2000 hours on July 13 the 233rd was reported as defending along a line from Kolenki to Staiki Station after helping to throw back German infantry from Bogushevskoe. Meanwhile, Timoshenko was planning a massive counteroffensive scheduled to begin that same day in which 20th Army would destroy the German forces that had crossed the Dniepr River near Astroŭna. Given the actual situation, no part of Timoshenko's plan was even remotely feasible. The next day the Marshal modified his directions to the Army; it was now to liquidate the penetrations in the Orsha and Shklow areas by the end of July 16 but this was no more realistic.

In heavy fighting on July 15 the 17th Panzer Division captured Orsha and, together with much of the rest of 2nd Panzer Group, drove the bulk of 20th and 19th Armies, including the 233rd and up to 19 other divisions of various types, into an elongated pocket along and north of the Dniepr west of Smolensk. During the prolonged struggle for the pocket the 20th and 19th Armies frequently shifted their forces to counter the German's blows. Specifically, 69th Corps defended the western and northwestern flanks from the Barysaw–Smolensk road northward to the Rudnya region. Timoshenko reported on July 18 that the 229th and 233rd were defending south and southeast of Dobromysl "against a concentration of enemy motorized infantry with 2,000 vehicles, which have apparently run out of fuel, and elements of 17th PzD and 35th ID in the Bogushevskoe region." In a report made late on July 23 the 233rd was said to be fighting along a line 45 km northwest of Smolensk. By July 25 the division had left 69th Corps and was holding its existing positions along with the 73rd Rifle Division and the remnants of 5th Mechanised. As of noon on July 27 it was reported as:

... moving northward [15-20km north of Smolensk] from reserve to prevent the enemy from advancing southward toward Smolensk, preparing to attack northward toward Krasnosele to protect the army's defenses from the north, and counterattacking toward Dukhovshchina, with one regiment in second echelon in the Dubrovo and Penisnar region.

At this time the division was reported as having just 18 antitank guns on hand, only a third of the number authorized; its overall strength was roughly in the same proportion. By August 1 it had returned to 69th Corps, joining the 73rd and 144th Rifle Divisions.

The headquarters of Western Front was now proposing an attack toward Yartsevo in order to assist Group Rokossovsky in reestablishing supply lines to 16th and 20th Armies. At this time the pocket was located northeast and east of Smolensk and had shrunken in size to 20 km east to west and 28 km north to south and contained fewer than 100,000 men who were running out of food, fuel and ammunition. Late on August 2 the 5th Mechanized, backed by the remnants of the 229th and 233rd Divisions, were ordered to cross to the south bank of the Dniepr beginning at dawn the next day and take up new defenses from the mouth of the Vop River to the mouth of the Ustrom. Group Rokossovsky had made some limited progress and the two pocketed Armies began their eastward withdrawal in earnest overnight on August 2/3, engaging company-size strongpoints manned by troops of the 20th Motorized Division. There was a roughly 10 km-wide gap between this division and 17th Panzer centered near Ratchino. The 229th was closest to Ratchino, with the 233rd close behind, and both got over the Dniepr there on August 4, running a gauntlet through the corridor, often under artillery fire and air attacks, and fording the river in places where it was less than 60 cm deep. As of August 5 the division's remaining forces, which had crossed in several groups, were assembling in the Zaprude region, 15 km east-southeast of Solovevo.

Following this escape the 233rd was briefly transferred to 16th Army and received orders to withdraw from its present positions at 0300 hours on August 7 and concentrate in the Balakirevo, Naidenovo, and Samoilovo region several hours later to prepare to operate toward the west and south. Soon after all of the Army's forces were transferred to 20th Army. The following day the Army issued Order No. 0014, in which it was noted that the 233rd had been disbanded in order to supply replacements for the 73rd Rifle Division. As of September 1 it was no longer part of the Red Army order of battle although it was not officially stricken off until September 19.

== 2nd Formation ==
A new 233rd began forming in April 1942 at Kirov in the Ural Military District, based on the 1st formation of the 34th Rifle Brigade.

=== 34th Rifle Brigade ===
This brigade began forming in October 1941 as a Kursantskii (student) brigade recruited from military schools in the Central Asian Military District. In late November it was assigned to the Reserve of the Supreme High Command and began moving north. In December it joined the 49th Army in Western Front advancing near Maloyaroslavets, and remained under this command for the rest of its existence. During most of the winter it faced units of the German 4th Army on a generally static front. It was then moved east to provide the cadre for the 233rd.

Once formed the division had the following order of battle, based on the shtat of March 18, 1942, and quite different from that of the 1st formation:

- 572nd Rifle Regiment
- 703rd Rifle Regiment
- 734th Rifle Regiment
- 684th Artillery Regiment
- 321st Antitank Battalion
- 275th Reconnaissance Company
- 341st Sapper Battalion
- 606th Signal Battalion (later 606th Signal Company)
- 284th Medical/Sanitation Battalion
- 278th Chemical Defense (Anti-gas) Company
- 298th Motor Transport Company
- 387th Field Bakery
- 857th Divisional Veterinary Hospital
- 1535th Field Postal Station
- 1637th Field Office of the State Bank

In April it was noted that the personnel of the division were roughly 75 percent of Azerbaijani nationality, with nearly all of the remainder being Russian. Col. Gennadii Petrovich Pankov was appointed to command of the division on May 16. This officer had previously led the 56th, 284th and 274th Rifle Divisions. Even prior to this appointment the division had been moved by rail to the Moscow Military District to complete its equipping and training. From May to August it was assigned to the Moscow Defence Zone and late in the latter month it was moved south to join Voronezh Front.

=== Kotluban Offensives ===
The German 6th Army penetrated from the Don to the Volga on August 23, reaching the northern outskirts of Stalingrad and creating a corridor that would be a magnet for Soviet attacks on both sides of Kotluban over the following months. In response to the German offensive the 233rd was transferred from Voronezh Front to Stalingrad Front where it joined 24th Army. The second Kotluban offensive began on September 18. While the first effort had failed, the Front commander, Col. Gen. A. I. Yeryomenko, was convinced that this was due to it having struck German panzer and mechanized forces. To avoid doing so again he shifted the axis of his main attack westward to the Samofalovka and 564 km Station regions due south of Kotluban, which was defended by elements of VIII Army Corps. While these defenses were judged as being weaker, the Red Army troops would still be forced to attack across open steppe with only darkness and gullies (balkas) for cover from fire.

The attack sector was 17 km wide from 564 km Station on the main railroad to the city as far as the Kotluban balka. As this was entirely within 24th Army's sector, and as this Army was considered too weak to spearhead the effort by itself, Yeryomenko was forced to regroup his armies in order to concentrate the necessary forces. Over a period of three days the 1st Guards Army took over the main attack sector while the remaining divisions of 24th Army were ordered to attack and penetrate the 60th Motorized Division's defenses east of the Station before exploiting toward Gorodishche. The Army deployed the 49th, 24th and 233rd right to left abreast on a 10 km wide sector from north of Kuzmichi westward to the Station. The infantry were to be supported by the 69th and 246th Tank Brigades, but these had only 18 operational vehicles between them. In addition, the 39th Guards Rifle Division was in second echelon, ready to reinforce the 233rd's attack east of the Station.

The offensive began with a 90-minute artillery preparation, which was largely ineffective, before the infantry and few tanks began their advances at 0700 hours. The German defenses were very well prepared in depth and machine gun, mortar and artillery fire from the high ground poured into the attackers. In one of the day's few early successes the 233rd, in cooperation with 1st Guards Army's 316th Rifle Division, managed to take 564 km Station and an unnumbered height about 1,000m to the east by 1030 hours. However, German reserves soon began arriving and by 1400 hours the offensive had been brought to a halt. Counterattacks soon drove the divisions back to their start lines and by the end of the next day the 24th Army had suffered more than 32,000 casualties. Colonel Pankov lost control of his division during the fighting and on September 20 he was relieved of his command; he was replaced on the 24th by Maj. Gen. Yosif Fyodorovich Barinov, who had previously led the 98th Rifle Division. Pankov was soon given command of the 1073rd Rifle Regiment of the 316th Division and went on to lead the 260th Rifle Division before being dismissed in November 1943, after which he served in several staff appointments until his retirement in 1957.

==== 3rd and 4th Offensives ====
Don Front was formed on September 30 and 24th Army was transferred to it. The new Front was under the command of Lt. Gen. K. K. Rokossovskii, and he was immediately directed to conduct a third offensive with the 24th and 1st Guards beginning on October 9. According to the Front's report for that day, "24th Army conducted attacks of local significance with part of its forces in the vicinity of Hill 130.7 and the Motor Tractor Station beginning at 1400 hours... but, encountering strong enemy resistance, had no success." 1st Guards made only marginal gains and the entire effort was shut down on October 11.

By the middle of the month 6th Army was beginning its successful drive against the Tractor Works inside the city, and a further effort was deemed necessary to divert German attention and reserves. The STAVKA issue a directive for a fourth offensive on October 15 and Rokossovskii replied the same day. His plan called for a shock group deployed on the right (west) flank of 66th Army and the left flank of 24th Army to penetrate the German defenses in the 15 km-wide sector north and northeast of Kuzmichi and to advance southeastward toward Orlovka. It was to begin on October 20 and achieve its objective five days later. The 24th Army shock group was to consist of the 316th, 173rd, and 233rd Divisions, all seriously understrength, and was to support and protect 66th Army's assaults. In light of the earlier costly failures Rokossovskii later admitted that he expected the assault to achieve very little:

We were given permission to use seven infantry divisions from the GHQ Reserve for the operation but received no additional supporting means in the shape of artillery, armour, or aircraft. The chances of success were remote, especially as the enemy had well fortified positions. Since the main objective in the operation fell to 66th Army, I had a conversation with Malinovsky, who begged me not to commit the seven new divisions to action. "We'll only waste them," he said... Happily only two [actually four] of the promised seven new divisions arrived by the deadline... As expected, the attack failed. The armies of the Don Front were unable to penetrate the enemy's defenses...

The three divisions of 24th Army faced the 120th Panzergrenadier Regiment of 60th Motorized plus its supporting 9th Machine Gun Battalion. The offensive began on October 19 and at the end of the next day the 233rd was reported as having "advanced forward insignificantly and exchanged fire from its previous positions." Rokossovskii persisted until October 27 but while the 24th Army shock group was reinforced with the 273rd Rifle Division it failed to make any further gains.

== Operation Uranus and Operation Ring ==
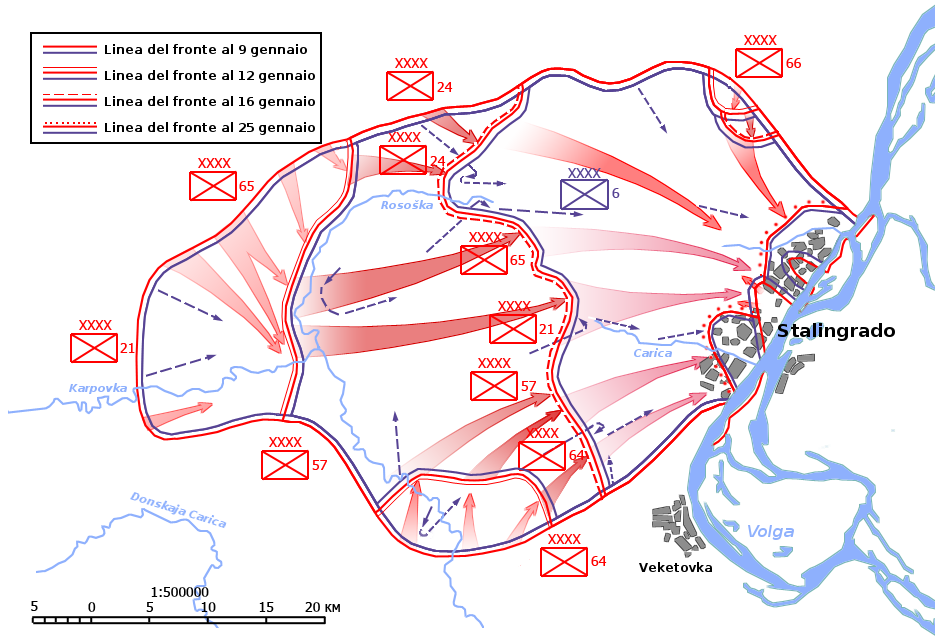
Operation Ring. Note position of 65th Army.

As Operation Uranus began on November 19 the division was in the second echelon of 24th Army. The Army had a minor role in the offensive, with three divisions attacking in the direction of Vertyachy, but the remainder of the Army was expected to tie down enemy forces through local attacks and raids to prevent them shifting westward to where the penetration was to take place. The attack on November 22 by the 49th, 214th, and 120th Rifle Divisions gained almost no ground in three days of fighting, despite the commitment of the 16th Tank Corps on the 23rd and the 84th Rifle Division on the 24th. This failure led to some acrimony between the 24th's commander, Lt. Gen. I. V. Galanin, and the commander of the 65th Army, Lt. Gen. P. I. Batov. The former renewed his attack on November 25 with the same shock group, now backed by the 233rd, and the depleted 16th Tanks still in the direct support role, in the Panshino area, but again made minimal progress. Thereafter, in two days of heavy fighting, the Army captured Verkhne- and Nizhne-Gnilovskii but remained 8 km north of its initial objective, Vertyachy. By this time the 16th Tanks had fewer than 20 vehicles still operational and the gains made by the Army were mostly attributable to the successes of 65th Army on its west flank forcing German withdrawals.

=== Operation Ring ===
Rokossovskii had been directed to maintain maximum pressure on the western and northwestern fronts of 6th Army's pocket, which largely consisted of reconnaissances-in-force by 21st and 65th Armies and the right wing of the 24th. In one such action on December 1 the 233rd seized Hill 121.3, also known as Vertyachy Kurgan, from the 131st Regiment of the 44th Infantry Division but was forced off by German counterattacks within 48 hours despite the arrival of reinforcements to try to leverage the success. By December 9 it was becoming clear that the operations necessary to eliminate 6th Army would require reinforcements, specifically the 2nd Guards Army which was en route. Until then the Don Front would be limited to pinning attacks to help prevent a German breakout. This prospect became more alarming on December 12 when 4th Panzer Army began a concentrated drive toward Stalingrad, which forced the STAVKA to divert the 2nd Guards to block it. Operation Ring (Koltso) was put on hold. On December 16 the 233rd was located at German ID Point 423 northeast to Point 417 and was now facing the 203rd Regiment of the 76th Infantry Division.

Before the new year the 233rd was transferred to 65th Army. After Operation Winter Storm had been defeated the fate of 6th Army was sealed, but much bitter fighting remained during January 1943. Don Front began more active operations on January 6 but the division was initially in second echelon and did not join the active fighting until January 15. It was immediately committed to the fighting for Pitomnik Airfield, the main base of the German airlift, and enveloped it from the north. By January 17 the 44th and 76th Infantry Divisions had been reduced to virtual remnants and on this date Soviet infantry and tanks captured Reference Point 441 before advancing eastward, tearing a 3 km-wide gap along the Rossoshka River between the two divisions, which was entered by 65th Army's 27th Guards, 304th and 233rd Divisions, although only the 27th Guards was able to cross the river. The next day Rokossovskii deliberately paused the main advance to replenish fuel and ammunition, but this shock group continued pushing into the gap in an effort to forestall the German divisions from setting up a new defense on the high ground anchored on Hill 120.0. The German forces, backed by remnants of 14th Panzer Division (with most of its remaining tanks immobilized for lack of fuel), won the race and the situation stabilized for several days.

On January 19 the 27th Guards, with support from the 304th and 233rd, tried but failed to penetrate the defenses of 76th Infantry on Hill 119.8. However, this attack was intended to soften up the German defenses for the more powerful attacks to come. The final stage of Operation Ring was supposed to kick off at 1000 hours on January 22 but the 65th Army launched a strong reconnaissance-in-force the previous day. The three divisions of the shock group, now joined by the 23rd Rifle Division and the 91st Tank Brigade, struck eastward, north and south of Hill 120.0, penetrated the defenses of 76th Infantry and advanced up to 2.5 km, reaching positions only 6 km northwest of Gumrak. The assault shattered the left wing of the 76th while elements of 21st Army completed the dismantling of 44th Infantry and advanced to within artillery range of Gumrak airfield.

The full assault on January 22 began with a 70-minute artillery preparation; there was no reply to this because German artillery ammunition had run out. The 233rd, with three other divisions, advanced up to 4 km, driving the 76th Infantry eastward and capturing Hill 144.7 plus the village of Zemlianka, 2 km northwest of Gumrak. These four divisions gained another 4 km the following day and pushed across the ring railroad north of Gumrak. In his memoirs Rokossovskii described the fighting in the area of the airfield, 6th Army's last physical link with the outside world, as being of "a bitter character" during January 24 and 25. By the end of the second day troops of Don Front were entering the city proper from the west and south; the 27th and 67th Guards with the 23rd and 233rd Divisions converged on Aleksandrovka and the western half of Gorodishche, capturing both towns as well as Razgulaevka Station. From here they pushed the remnants of the 76th and 113th Infantry Divisions east toward the Vishnevaya Balka and the western end of the village associated with the Barrikady Ordnance Factory.

==== Battle for the City ====
In the last act of the battle, beginning on January 26, the 67th Guards, 233rd and 24th Divisions were ordered to orient their assaults on the western edge of the Krasny Oktyabr village and the southwestern edge of Barrikady village, where they were to link up with the forces on 62nd Army's right wing. General Batov coordinated closely with that Army on recognition signals and radio call signs to ensure there were no friendly-fire incidents, especially with the 13th Guards and 284th Rifle Divisions. By this time the divisions of 65th Army were averaging 1,000-2,000 "bayonets" (infantry and sappers) each. Shortly after dawn the German position had been chopped into a northern and a southern pocket. and the 233rd joined hands with the 13th Guards. At 1130 hours on the 27th the division captured the southern portion of upper Krasny Oktyabr village and also linked up with the 39th Guards Rifle Division south of Hill 107.5. Thereafter the division joined with the 13th Guards, the 23rd Division and the 91st Tank Brigade in wheeling north and attacking the southwestern part of the Barrikady village. Progress over the next few days was limited due to well-prepared defenses held by some of the few combat-effective units left in LI Army Corps.

The southern pocket surrendered on January 31 but the next day the roughly 50,000 German troops in the northern pocket were still holding out. A massive artillery bombardment, followed by airstrikes, began at about 0700 hours. 65th Army's ground assault began at 1000 from positions along the eastern bank of the Vishnevaya Balka with six divisions, including the 233rd. Within hours the attackers gained more than 1,000m in places, notably in the area between the Tractor Works and the Barrikady. The German XI Army Corps surrendered at 0800 on February 2 and the fighting eventually died out, although many holdouts remained in the rubble. The next day the STAVKA ordered 65th Army headquarters, together with the Don Front headquarters and its commander, Rokossovskii, northward to the Yelets area. The 233rd was transferred to the Stalingrad Group of Forces, responsible for mopping up the city, while General Barinov was made deputy commander of 62nd Army. He would soon join Batov's headquarters as deputy commander of 65th Army, where he would remain until May 1946, winning the rank of lieutenant general in November 1944. He was replaced by Col. Yakov Nikiforovich Vronskii, who had previously led the 62nd Rifle Division.

== Into Ukraine ==
On February 7 the Stalingrad Group officially came under the Reserve of the Supreme High Command; most if not all of its formations were in need of substantial rebuilding. In orders issued on February 28 the forces of the Stalingrad Group were reassigned. The 233rd went back to 24th Army, which was now in the Valuyki region in the Reserve of the Supreme High Command. Along with the other divisions it was to be replenished with personnel, horses, weapons and other equipment to bring it up to a strength of 8,000 men. In further orders on March 11 the 24th Army was assigned to a new Reserve Front, behind the Central and Voronezh Fronts, effective March 13. During this period the division's composition changed significantly form what it had been before Stalingrad. In April it was noted that 60 percent of its personnel were of Kazakh or Uzbek nationality, and about ten percent were serving in penal battalions or companies. The division remained in the Reserve over the following months, being transferred to the 53rd Army in the Steppe Military District in May.

=== Operation Polkovodets Rumyantsev ===
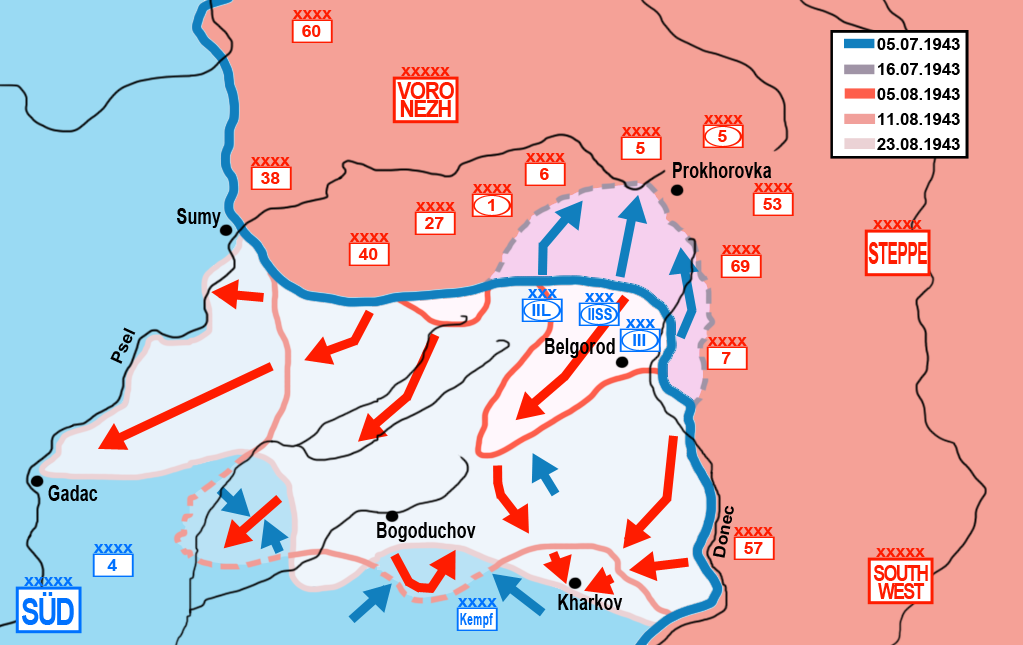
Operation Polkovodets Rumyantsev

Once the STAVKA took the decision to await a German offensive against the Kursk salient the armies of Steppe Military District (as of July 9 Steppe Front) became both a longstop defense force and a reserve for the eventual counteroffensive. By mid-May the 53rd Army was digging in along the Kshen River on a sector from Nikolskoe to Prilepy.

The German offensive in the south began on July 5 and was effectively halted by July 12. On the 26th, Colonel Vronskii left his command; he would soon serve as deputy commander of the 93rd Guards Rifle Division and as commander of the 320th Rifle Division, being promoted to the rank of major general in April 1945. The following day, Col. Yuri Ivanovich Sokolov, who had previously served largely as a staff officer, took over the division. For the counteroffensive, Operation Polkovodets Rumyantsev, the Front commander, Col. Gen. I. S. Konev, formed a shock group consisting of 53rd Army and the 48th Rifle Corps of 69th Army. These were deployed on an 11 km-wide front from Glushinskii to Visloe for an attack to begin on August 3. 53rd Army had three reinforced divisions in first echelon with four divisions, including the 233rd, and 1st Mechanized Corps in second.

The counteroffensive started as planned, preceded by a complex artillery preparation from 0500 to 0815 hours. The shock group faced stubborn trench fighting until 1500 when 1st Mechanized was committed and completed the breakthrough of the main German defensive zone. In all the 53rd Army advanced 7–9 km by day's end. On August 4 the Army broke through the second and third defensive zones which covered Belgorod from the north. For the next day it was ordered "to speed up the offensive in the general direction of Mikoyanovka." In accordance it pushed the defenders out of the Streletskoye and Bolkhovets strongpoints, breaking through the fourth defensive line and reached a line from Vodyanoe to Krasnoe; the 89th Guards and 305th Rifle Divisions of 69th Army cleared Belgorod by 1800 hours.

=== Battles for the Dniepr ===
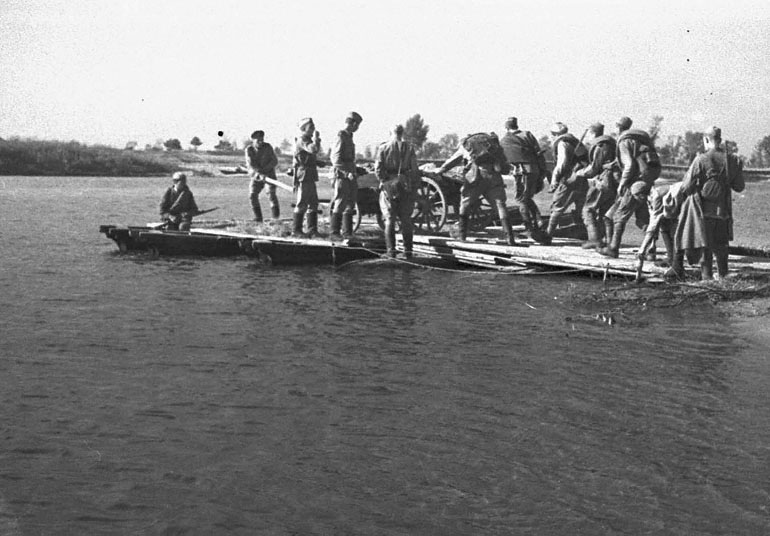
Soviet soldiers crossing the Dniepr on improvised rafts

With the liberation of Belgorod and later Kharkov on August 23 the Red Army embarked on an offensive to clear the remainder of eastern Ukraine. Early in September the 233rd, along with the 214th Division, was assigned to the newly formed 75th Rifle Corps. Steppe Front advanced toward Poltava and, after that city was taken, continued on toward Kremenchuk. This was one of the five crossing points over the Dniepr available to Army Group South as it withdrew to the so-called Wotan line. On September 26 the Front made three improvised crossings between Kremenchuk and Dnipropetrovsk which, over the next few days were expanded to a single bridgehead 50 km wide and up to 16 km deep. Three days later it was awarded its first honorific:

KREMENCHUG – ...233rd Rifle Division (Col. Sokolov, Yuri Ivanovich)... The troops that participated in the liberation of Kremenchug, by order of the Supreme Commander-in-Chief of 29 September 1943 and a commendation in Moscow, are given a salute of 12 artillery salvoes by 120 guns.

In the first weeks of October General Konev shifted his 5th Guards Army to the bridgehead south of the city that was being held by 53rd Army. The Kremenchug-Pyatikhatki Offensive began on October 15 when a dozen rifle divisions attacked out of the bridgehead and by the next day Konev had three armies across the river, tearing open the left flank of 1st Panzer Army. On October 18 Piatykhatky was liberated, cutting the main railroads to Dnipropetrovsk and Kryvyi Rih, which was the obvious next objective. The lead elements of Steppe Front (as of October 20 2nd Ukrainian Front) reached the outskirts of Kryvyi Rih but were counterattacked on the 27th by the XXXX Panzer Corps, driving them back some 32 km and doing considerable damage to the Red Army formations in the process. During this fighting Colonel Sokolov was wounded and hospitalized on October 23. He would be promoted to major general in January 1944 but was not released from hospital until August when he was given command of the 111th Rifle Division. He was not yet completely recovered and required a further stay in hospital from the end of September until early in the new year before returning to the 111th for the duration of the war. He was replaced in command of the 233rd by Col. Ivan Fomich Shcheglov, but this officer was in turn replaced on November 30 by Col. Ivan Mikhailovich Vodopyanov. During October the division had again come under direct command of 53rd Army, but in December it returned to 75th Corps. On December 10 it was awarded its second battle honor:

ZNAMENKA – ...233rd Rifle Division (Col. Vodopyanov, Ivan Mikhailovich)... The troops that participated in the liberation of Znamenka, by order of the Supreme Commander-in-Chief of 10 December 1943 and a commendation in Moscow, are given a salute of 12 artillery salvoes by 120 guns.

On January 3, 1944, Konev launched an offensive toward Kirovograd, with 53rd Army, backed by 5th Guards Mechanized Corps, advancing toward Mala Vyska. The city was reached within 48 hours and the XXXXVII Panzer Corps was encircled, being forced to break out to the west on January 8. The previous day Colonel Vodopyanov had left the division, being replaced by Col. Dmitrii Ilich Taranov for the next two months until Vodopyanov returned on March 9.

=== First Jassy-Kishinev Offensive ===
In February the division was reassigned to 49th Rifle Corps, still in 53rd Army, but in March it returned to 75th Corps which was moved to 4th Guards Army, also in 2nd Ukrainian Front. This Army was in the center of the Front and was assigned the role of piercing the German defenses along the Dniestr River, capturing Orhei, and leading the march on Chișinău. By the first week of April the 75th Corps had already swept westward across the Dniestr north of Rîbnița and the 20th Guards Rifle Corps was driving southward toward Orhei. At this time the 75th Corps contained the 233rd, 6th, and 84th Rifle Divisions. The Corps' advance soon became bogged down among the mud-clogged roads well to the rear and was unable to reach its designated jumping-off positions.

Despite the many daunting problems caused by the spring rasputitsa the 4th Guards Army resumed its offensive on April 5. on the right wing the 75th Corps finally reached the Kula River by day's end and tried to force it on a 20 km-wide sector between Krasnosheny and Brianovo, between 15 and 35 km west of Orhei but this effort was stymied by strong resistance from the 13th and 14th Panzer Divisions. Orhei itself fell to the 20th Guards Corps the following day, but this was also soon brought to a halt. The fighting in this sector continued until April 13, at considerable cost to both sides; by now the combat strength of the Army's divisions was down to roughly 5,000 men each. On April 18 Konev ordered it to go over to the defense, and 75th Corps was withdrawn into the 2nd Ukrainian Front reserve. Before the end of the month it was reassigned to 5th Guards Army, although the Corps now consisted of the 233rd, 299th and 78th Guards Rifle Divisions.

== Into the Balkans ==
During May, as the fighting abated, the 75th Corps, now minus the 78th Guards, returned to the Front reserves. The next month the Corps was again reassigned, now back to the 53rd Army. On June 3 Colonel Vodopyanov left the division again and was replaced the next day by Col. Timofei Ilich Sidorenko. In July the Corps, still with the 233rd and 299th Divisions, moved back to the Front reserves, but in August the division left the Corps and came under direct command of 53rd Army. In the aftermath of the defeat of the German 6th Army during the Second Jassy-Kishinev Offensive and the defection of Romania to the Allied side the Army helped lead the advance toward the Romanian capital and one of the division's regiments won a battle honor:

BUCHAREST – ...572nd Rifle Regiment (Maj. Pastushenko, Andrei Romanovich)... The troops that participated in battles with the enemy on the outskirts of Bucharest, by order of the Supreme Commander-in-Chief of 31 August 1943 and a commendation in Moscow, are given a salute of 24 artillery salvoes by 324 guns.

In further honors for this fighting, on September 17 the 703rd Rifle Regiment would be awarded the Order of the Red Banner, while the 734th Rifle Regiment would be given the Order of Bogdan Khmelnitsky, 2nd Degree.

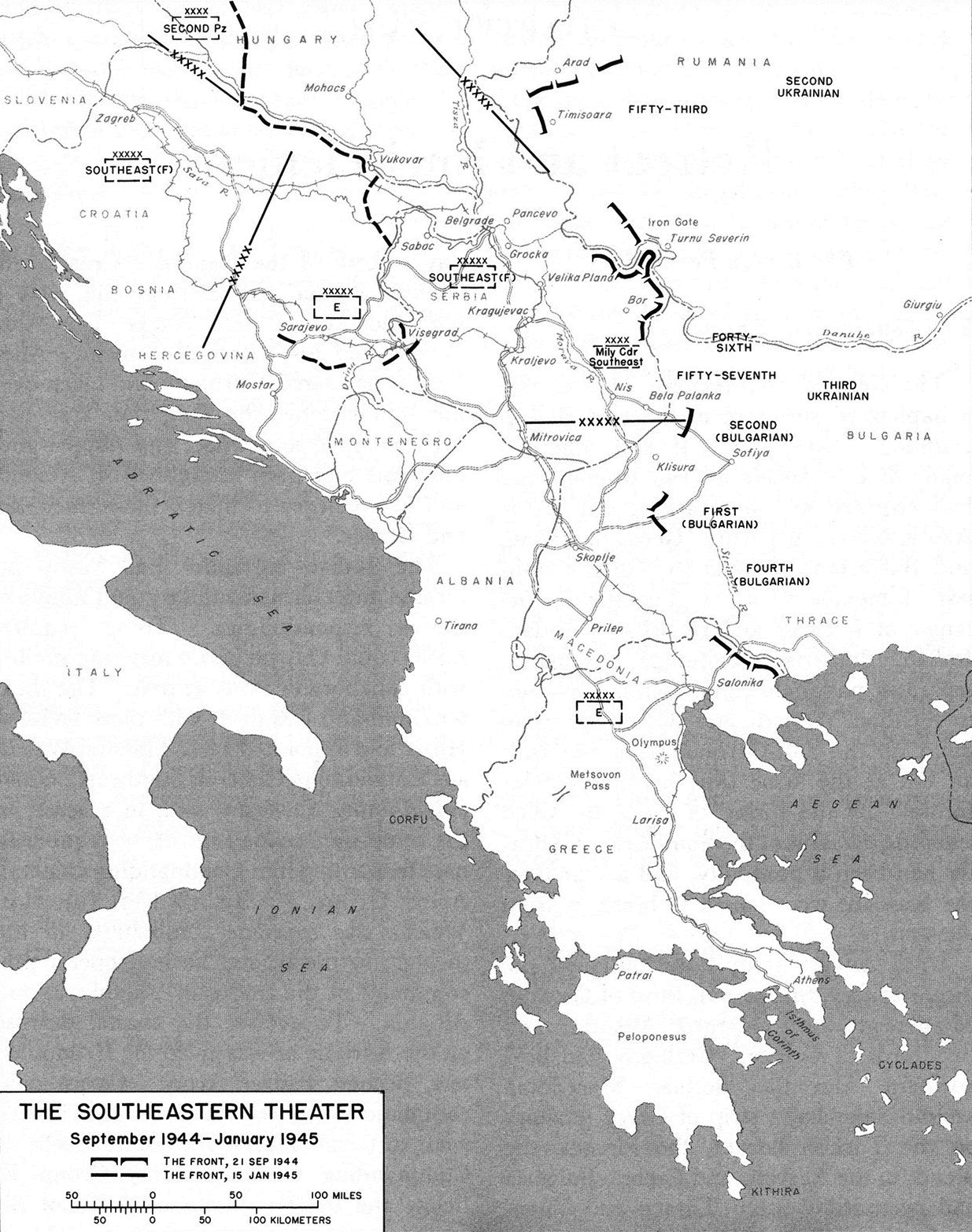
Advance of Soviet and Allied forces on Belgrade

In September it returned to 75th Corps, which was now assigned to the 57th Army of 3rd Ukrainian Front. On the night of September 8, after forces of the Front, led by the 57th, crossed its border, the government of Bulgaria also went over to the Allies. The Army moved west, south of the Danube, linking to the mobilizing Bulgarian armies to its south, approaching the border of Yugoslavia by September 19 and crossing the river into the bend west of Turnu Severin on the 22nd. The German Army Group F sent the 1st Mountain Division to oppose this move but it could only impose a delay. On October 4 Soviet forces reached Pančevo on the north bank of the Danube 16 km downstream from Belgrade and on the 8th the railroad running into the city from the south was cut. On the night of October 14 a combined force of Soviet troops and Yugoslav partisans entered Belgrade and took the city center by the next afternoon. For this feat another regiment of the division was awarded a battle honor:

BELGRADE - 703rd Rifle Regiment (Maj. Kolomaev, Fyodor Nikolaevich)... The troops who participated in the battles of Belgrade, by the order of the Supreme High Command of 20 October 1944, and a commendation in Moscow, are given a salute of 24 artillery salvoes from 324 guns.

Later in October the 3rd Ukrainian Front crossed the Sava River and by the end of the month reached the Ruma area, 60 km northwest of Belgrade. At this time the 57th Army's forces were dispersed over a very large area with lengthy lines of communication.

=== Battle of Batina ===
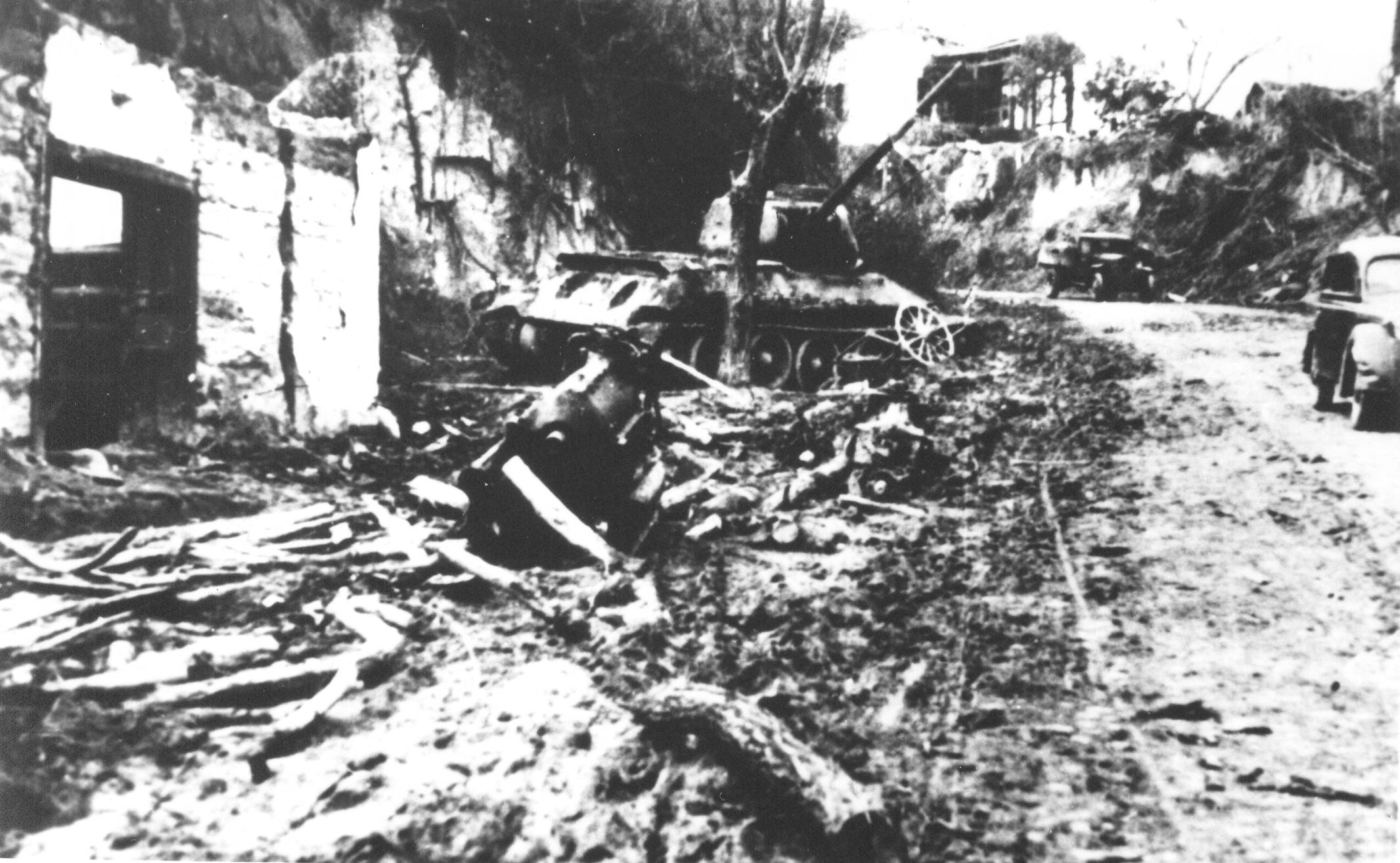
Batina after the battle

On October 28 elements of 75th Corps relieved units of 46th Army and occupied their defensive lines; following this the entire 57th Army was ordered on October 31 to cross to the west bank of the Danube. The crossing operations were led by 75th Corps overnight on November 7/8 in the area of Batina–Apatin. The Corps' artillery was reinforced with two regiments of artillery with a guards mortar regiment in reserve. The 233rd was deployed along a line from Baja to Mohács to Batina and the 74th Rifle Division from outside Batina to outside Dalj. Four battalions of the 74th made the initial crossings and were followed the next night by two companies of the 703rd Regiment near Batina which got into an intense fight. Despite numerous counterattacks the bridgeheads were consolidated and held. By the end of November 11 the 703rd had fully crossed and captured Batina while engineer units had begun constructing ferry and bridge crossings.

As a result of these crossing operations Jr. Sgt. Andrei Gurevich Khatanzeysky was made a Hero of the Soviet Union. A section leader of the 341st Sapper Battalion and a Komi by ethnicity, he led his section in a light boat across the Danube overnight on November 6/7 to reconnoitre a possible landing site near Batina. The next night he led the crossings of 85 riflemen, nine heavy machine guns, three mortars with their crews, and 46 boxes of ammunition. in the subsequent fighting in the bridgehead he personally accounted for about ten German soldiers killed. He was officially awarded the Gold Star on March 24, 1945, but was killed in action near Lake Balaton on April 9 before he could receive it.

The first German reserves to arrive were the 31st SS Division plus the 2nd Regiment of the Brandenburg Division. As the Corps' units continued to cross the bridgeheads came under more intensive counterattacks beginning on November 12, led by the 35th SS Division. During this fighting the 233rd was subordinated to the 64th Rifle Corps, which was reinforcing the Batina bridgehead with its 73rd Guards Rifle Division. By the end of November 15 the 233rd had pushed as far as Draž while the Guardsmen were holding at Batina station. At this point a total of 192 guns and mortars of 76mm or greater calibre had been crossed into the Batina bridgehead and the immediate objective was to link up with the bridgehead at Apatin. This was delayed until the morning of November 20 when a 16-tonne pontoon bridge was finally put in place, enabling the 113th Rifle Division and considerable artillery reinforcements to get over. As the bridgehead was built up the 233rd and 73rd Guards were to be pulled into reserve to develop the subsequent offensive along the Kneževi Vinogradi–Topola axis. To this end the 19th Rifle Division relieved part of the division northeast of Draž overnight on November 17/18.

The first attempt to break out of the bridgehead began at 1000 hours on November 19 following a 45-minute artillery preparation but this was not successful; the 74th and 233rd Divisions were accused of indecisiveness and lack of initiative. Conditions were also extremely difficult, with the Danube's autumn flooding making many low-lying areas impassable and forcing attacking infantry to wade through cold water sometimes chest-deep. Following this effort the division was finally pulled back into Army reserve. By the end of November 22 a successful breakout had been achieved in the direction of Podolje. The bridgeheads linked up the next day following an advance of as much as 10 km. Overnight the 41st Guards Rifle Division of 4th Guards Army took over the sector of the 233rd prior to making its own crossing of the Danube. By the end of November 24 the division had returned to 75th Corps and had reached as far as Kneževi Vinogradi–east of Grabovac–northern outskirts of Lug. In recognition of their successes in this crossing of the Danube, on January 6, 1945, the division itself would be awarded the Order of the Red Banner, while the 572nd Regiment was given the Order of Kutuzov, 3rd Degree, and the 703rd Regiment received the Order of Suvorov, 3rd Degree.

By December the 684th Artillery Regiment had been modified into a typical late-war configuration. Although its personnel strength was just a little over 600 (about 60 percent of authorized strength) the regiment had all of its weapons: three battalions, each with two batteries of eight 76mm cannon total and one battery of 122mm howitzers. However, instead of all the cannon being horse-drawn and the howitzers being pulled by tractors, the division and the regiment had "obtained" enough trucks to motorize one battery of cannon per battalion. This gave the division enough mobile artillery to support one rifle regiment in pursuit or forward detachment operations.

==== Tragedy on the Drava ====
During the first days of December the Front's forces advanced into Hungary, although the STAVKA ordered it to go over to the defensive upon reaching the "Margarita Line" along the southeastern shore of Lake Balaton–Nagykanizsa–the mouth of the Mur River in the face of increasing resistance. By the end of December 8 the 75th Corps was fighting for Somogyvisonta, Erdecsokonya, Somogytarnoca and Barcs while two battalions of the 703rd Regiment crossed the Drava back into Croatia to capture Virovitica. The Front carried out a regrouping beginning on December 13 in preparation for resuming the offensive. As part of this the 233rd was to be moved to the 57th Army's 68th Rifle Corps which was to be pulled into reserve after turning over its sector to units of the Bulgarian 1st Army and concentrate by December 24 in the Bonyhád area.

In the plans for the offensive the division was to continue to hold the bridgehead over the Drava with two rifle regiments, backed by the 23rd Flamethrower Battalion, while one regiment remained in reserve in the Csokonyavisonta area. On December 26 the bridgehead, which had expanded to include Pitomača, came under attack by the 1st Cossack Cavalry Division of the Russian Liberation Army. The Cossacks launched a surprise attack in fog and, after crashing through the forward elements, encircled the 703rd Regiment, the flamethrower battalion, and part of the 684th Artillery in Pitomača. Colonel Sidorenko was slow to react to these developments and by the time he got the 734th Regiment into action the 703rd had been defeated with considerable losses; the 684th also lost 42 personnel killed or captured, six 76mm cannon, five 122mm howitzers, 14 vehicles and 14 radio sets.

== Hungarian Campaign ==
On the same day that the Pitomača battle took place the Hungarian capital was encircled, and the Axis forces began operations to relieve the garrison on January 1, 1945. The third such operation, called Konrad III, began on January 18. On the morning of January 20 the German forces continued to attack to the east and northeast in an effort to capture Székesfehérvár. In reaction the 233rd and 236th Rifle Divisions were pulled into Front reserve in case they were needed to defend the southern sector of the new defensive front. The 233rd moved up using motor and rail transport to concentrate in the Pincehely area. Székesfehérvár fell on January 22. Two days later the headquarters of 133rd Rifle Corps was attached to 57th Army and the two divisions came under its command; the Corps formed the Army's right flank along the Sárvíz Canal. As an indication of the rapidly evolving situation on the Soviet side, the next day the 135th Rifle Corps headquarters was also subordinated to the Army and the two divisions shifted to its command. The 233rd would remain in the Corps for the duration of the war. By the 26th the German relief force had reached to within 25 km of the inner encirclement but this proved to be the limit of the advance. The next day the 3rd Ukrainian Front continued a counterstrike between the Danube and Lake Velence. By the day's end the 233rd, on the right flank of 57th Army, captured Sáregres and was fighting for Igar.

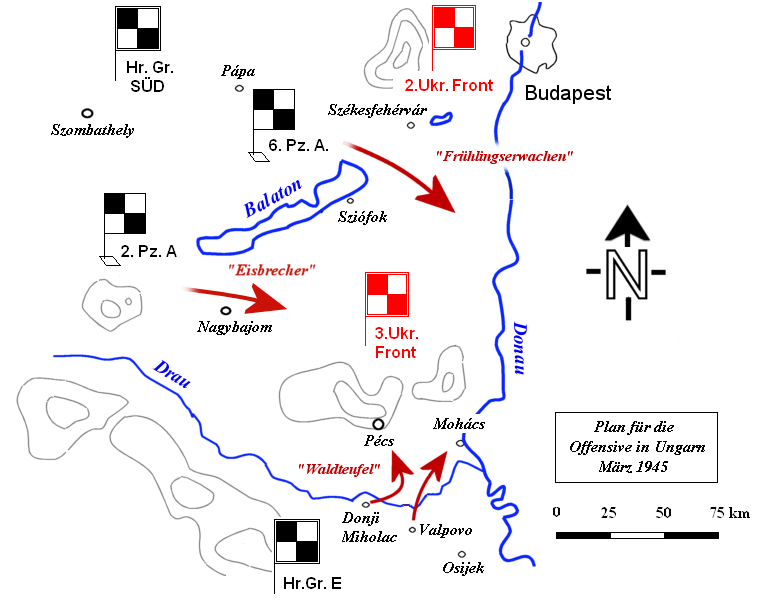
Operation Spring Awakening

Budapest fell on February 13. During the month the 135th Corps, which now also contained the 74th Division, was moved to 26th Army, still in 3rd Ukrainian Front. The 233rd remained in this Army into the postwar. In the first days of March Lt. Col. Ivan Nikolaevich Dolgov took over the 734th Rifle Regiment after being released from hospital; he had previously held a regimental command in the 236th Division. During Operation Spring Awakening, which began on March 6, he led his regiment in defensive fighting against the German forces advancing south of Lake Balaton, accounting for 11 tanks and self-propelled guns plus roughly 300 German officers and men killed. Following the end of the offensive the 26th Army went over to the counteroffensive and on March 19 Dolgov's regiment took Hill 220. The next day the village of Shimantornia was taken and the Kapos Canal was crossed from the march. The regiment reached the northern outskirts of Füle and cut an escape route for retreating German forces. This led to the loss of two German tanks plus five armored personnel carriers, 12 trucks, as well as 250 personnel killed and more than 80 captured. On April 28, in recognition of these successes Dolgov was made a Hero of the Soviet Union.

On March 10 Colonel Sidorenko left the division; he was replaced the next day by Col. Fyodor Pavlovich Berezhnov. This officer would be promoted to major general on April 19 and would lead the 233rd for the duration of its existence. During early April the 26th Army advanced on Vienna, which was taken on April 13, and the division ended the war advancing north of Graz.

== Postwar ==
At the time of the German surrender the men and women of the division shared the full title of 233rd Rifle, Kremchug-Znamenka, Order of the Red Banner Division. (Russian: 233-я стрелковая Кременчугско-Знаменская Краснознамённая дивизия.) On June 15 it was assigned, along with the rest of its Army, to the Southern Group of Forces, but this was short-lived as the division was disbanded in October.
