= 214th Rifle Division =

- Active: 1941–1946
- Country: Soviet Union
- Branch: Red Army
- Type: Infantry
- Size: Division
- Engagements: Operation Barbarossa; Battle of Smolensk (1941); Operation Typhoon; Battle of Stalingrad; Operation Uranus; Operation Ring; Belgorod–Kharkov offensive operation Chernigov-Poltava Strategic Offensive; Battle of the Dniepr; Kremenchug-Pyatikhatki Offensive; Kirovograd offensive Uman–Botoșani offensive First Jassy–Kishinev offensive Lvov–Sandomierz offensive Vistula–Oder offensive Lower Silesian offensive Battle of Berlin; Battle of Bautzen (1945); Prague offensive
- Decorations: Order of the Red Banner (2nd formation); Order of Suvorov (2nd formation); Order of Bogdan Khmelnitsky (2nd formation)
- Battle honours: Kremenchug (2nd formation); Aleksandriya (2nd formation)

Commanders
- Notable commanders: Maj. Gen. Mark Mikhailovich Butsko; Maj. Gen. Anatolii Nikolaevich Rozanov; Maj. Gen. Nikolai Ivanovich Biryukov; Maj. Gen. Grigorii Nikitich Zhukov

The 214th Rifle Division was an infantry division of the Red Army, originally formed in the months just before the start of the German invasion, based on the shtat (table of organization and equipment) of September 13, 1939. It was moved to the fighting front to join 22nd Army in late June and took part in the fighting between Vitebsk and Nevel in early July, escaping from encirclement in the process, and then played a significant role in the liberation of Velikiye Luki, the first Soviet city to be retaken from the invading armies. In October it was again encircled near Vyasma during Operation Typhoon and was soon destroyed.

The 433rd Rifle Division began forming in late 1941 at Ufa in the South Ural Military District as a Bashkiri national division but on December 25 it was redesignated as the 2nd formation of the 214th. In July 1942 it was moved to the area west of Stalingrad and fought in the battle for that city until the beginning of February 1943, eventually assisting in mopping up the factory district. From there it was moved north to form part of the reserves behind the Kursk salient in 53rd Army. During the subsequent summer offensive into Ukraine it reached and crossed the Dniepr near Kremenchuk and was awarded its name as a battle honor. In the winter battles on the west bank it won a further honorific as well as the Order of the Red Banner. During the spring offensives toward Romania it was part of 5th Guards Army in 2nd Ukrainian Front and fought unsuccessfully along the Dniestr River until being moved to the Reserve of the Supreme High Command and joining 52nd Army. Under this command it became part of 1st Ukrainian Front and advanced through southern Poland and Silesia, winning two further decorations in the process. In the final offensive into Germany it saw heavy fighting in Saxony during one of the last desperate German counteroffensives in late April 1945, then advanced with its Front toward Prague. After the German surrender it moved back to Poland and later Ukraine before being disbanded in mid-1946.

== 1st Formation ==
The division began forming in March 1941 at Voroshilovgrad in the Kharkov Military District. When completed it had the following order of battle:

- 776th Rifle Regiment
- 780th Rifle Regiment
- 788th Rifle Regiment
- 683rd Artillery Regiment
- 709th Howitzer Artillery Regiment
- 20th Antitank Battalion
- 128th Antiaircraft Battalion
- 302nd Reconnaissance Battalion
- 403rd Sapper Battalion
- 603rd Signal Battalion
- 364th Medical/Sanitation Battalion
- 703rd Motor Transport Battalion
- 492nd Field Bakery
- 911th Divisional Veterinary Hospital
- 655th Field Postal Station
- 630th Field Office of the State Bank

Maj. Gen. Mark Mikhailovich Butsko was appointed to command on March 22; he had previously commanded the 46th Rifle Division. At the outbreak of the war the 214th was still under direct command of the Kharkov Military District, where it officially remained as of July 1, although it had become part of the active Army on June 29. By July 10 it had joined the 22nd Army in Western Front as a separate division. General Butsko was severely wounded on July 5 and was replaced in command by Maj. Gen. Anatolii Nikolaevich Rozanov. Butsko never held another field command and retired in 1945.

=== Battles for Nevel and Velikiye Luki ===
When the division arrived in Lt. Gen. F. A. Ershakov's 22nd Army the German Army Group Center had captured Vitebsk but the Army was attempting to hold what remained of the Dvina River line from the Polotsk Fortified Region east toward Haradok. The commander of Western Front, Marshal S. K. Timoshenko, issued orders late on July 12 for Ershakov to carry out a counterattack the following morning with the 214th and 186th Rifle Divisions and supporting artillery from the Haradok area south toward Vitebsk. This plan was stillborn when the LVII Motorized Corps, backed by the L and XXIII Army Corps drove the Army from its defenses along the Dvina northwest of Polotsk, cut it into two parts, enveloped its flanks and threatened both parts with encirclement. With only six divisions to defend a front 274km wide Ershakov was soon in full retreat as the panzers drove northward toward Nevel.

Nevel was taken by LVII Motorized on the morning of July 16 which left four of 22nd Army's divisions (50th, 174th, 186th and 214th) cut off and isolated between that town and Vitebsk. As the German commanders debated the size of the encircled forces and exactly how best to deal with them while also carrying out their other objectives, the four divisions did their best to escape in the general direction of Velikiye Luki, aided by the difficult terrain in the region. By July 19 the division had been subordinated to the 29th Rifle Corps of 22nd Army which also contained the 126th and 179th Rifle Divisions. On that date the 19th Panzer Division had captured the city but overnight elements of 22nd Army attacked and overran the thin screen being held around Nevel by 14th Motorized Division, allowing the Army's encircled 62nd Rifle Corps to escape to the east. This pressure also forced 19th Panzer to abandon the city on July 21 and Ershakov triumphantly signalled the commander of 62nd Corps:

We have captured Velikiye Luki. 29th Rifle Corps (179th and 214th Rifle Divisions) are attacking toward Nevel to destroy the enemy and support your withdrawal... An automobile [truck] column (50 vehicles) with ammunition, fuel, and food is being sent to you in the Zui region [35km south of Velikiye Luki]...

He later reported that the division was attacking toward the north in the Poreche and Staraya Reka regions. This overlooked victory was the first large city liberated by the Red Army. Ershakov now attempted to create a new defense line along the Lovat River although his 51st Rifle Corps had been reduced to remnants.

By July 23 the 214th was situated in the area of Rogatkino and Shchukino. As of July 31 it was operating at roughly half its original strength. In an operational summary by Western Front late on August 3 it was said to be under attack by two German infantry regiments at Lazava with unknown results. As the German forces regrouped to take back Velikiye Luki the division was transferred to 51st Corps and on August 21 was reported as operating in the German rear with two rifle regiments toward Novosokolniki in cooperation with a cavalry division. The German counterstroke was well underway by this point with the 19th and 20th Panzer and 256th and 102nd Infantry Divisions committed. Supply lines to 22nd Army were being disrupted the next day and at 1015 hours on August 24 Ershakov was forced to issue orders for his forces to break out in the direction of Toropets. In the plan for the breakout the 126th Rifle and 48th Tank Divisions were in the first echelon with the 179th and 214th in second, followed by what remained of 62nd Corps and the 170th Rifle Division as rearguard; the operation began at 2200 hours. The artillery and trucks of the 214th were stretched out on the road along its axis of attack and on the morning of the 25th came under heavy air, artillery and mortar attacks, causing considerable losses. The escaping force numbered from 15-20,000 men while another 25,000 of 22nd Army remained behind in small pockets south of Velikiye Luki and either fought to the death or surrendered over the following days. By the end of the month the division was reduced to 2,500 men, with no heavy equipment left at all. On August 29 General Rozanov was moved to command of the 253rd Rifle Division; he went on to serve as deputy chief of staff of 11th Army before being fatally wounded in August 1943. Col. Vasilii Dmitrievich Bunin was not appointed to lead the 214th until September 9.

=== Operation Typhoon ===
In a report at 0300 hours on August 30 Marshal Timoshenko reported to Stalin that the remnants of the 214th and 48th Tanks (which had lost all its vehicles) were fighting north of Toropets as a combined unit along a line from Podroshcha to Mankovo. During the period from September 2-4 the 214th lost 148 men killed or wounded as the German forces were largely inactive. Over the following week the reorganising forces of 22nd Army struck back at the German forces advancing on Andreapol, with some limited success; the combined divisions attacked from the line of Zolotilovo–Safonovo–Zaprude and reached Berdovo by 1300 hours.

Later in the month the 214th was transferred to 16th Army, still in Western Front. It was there when the main part of Operation Typhoon began on October 2 although it was in the process of transferring to the sector of 19th Army. At this time its equipment consisted of 15 heavy machine guns, 96 light machine guns, two antiaircraft guns, eight field artillery pieces, eight mortars, and just 52 percent of its authorized motor vehicles. Given the German threat along the Vyazma axis the STAVKA was bringing in reinforcements from less active sectors. This movement, especially that of the vehicles with which the division was partly re-equipped, was spotted by German aerial reconnaissance near Yartsevo and this was followed by bombing and strafing attacks. During the day the German ground forces made progress in the direction of Bely and Kaniutino Station. On the morning of October 3 the commander of Western Front, Col. Gen. I. S. Konev, prepared to attack this penetration with his own forces from the south and elements of 30th Army from the north. The 214th, along with the 89th and 166th Rifle Divisions, supported by tanks and rocket artillery, was to destroy the grouping that had crossed the Vop River and reestablish the defenses along this line.

In the event the coordinator of the 19th Army forces, Lt. Gen. M. F. Lukin, chose to delay the counterattack until noon on October 4 but as the situation deteriorated with further German advances he put it back farther, to 0500 hours on October 5. Although Lukin's grouping inflicted a debatable number of casualties on the attackers its counterattack never got off the ground. That afternoon Konev reported to the STAVKA, among other claims, that the 214th had halted the German penetration on the left flank of 19th Army. Despite this optimistic report he was given permission to withdraw Western Front to a line from Rzhev to Vyasma, but his orders to 19th Army were not received until 0400 hours on October 6 and by this time the proposed lines of retreat were hopelessly compromised. At 1600 hours on October 7 it was reported that units of the division were crossing the Vopets River. General Lukin signalled the STAVKA directly at 1030 on October 8 (communications with Konev having broken down) that the remnants of the 214th had assembled in the woods northeast of Bogdanovshchina, but this report was not received until 1935 hours on October 11. By this time Lukin's grouping had linked up with the forces commanded by Lt. Gen. I. V. Boldin in an effort to break out of the encirclement. During the day the 214th, with one regiment of the 101st Motorized Division, had found a gap through the woods 1km north of Bogoroditskoe, but this was soon plugged by tanks and infantry and communications with them had been lost. This effectively spelled the end of the division as an organized force, although it was not officially deleted from the Red Army's order of battle until December 27.

== 2nd Formation ==
A new 214th Rifle Division was created on December 25, 1941 as a redesignation of the 433rd Rifle Division in the South Ural Military District at Ufa. It was considered a Bashkiri division as most of its recruits were of that ethnicity. Once formed its order of battle was very similar to that of the 1st formation, although it was based on the shtat of July 29, 1941:

- 776th Rifle Regiment
- 780th Rifle Regiment
- 788th Rifle Regiment
- 683rd Artillery Regiment
- 20th Antitank Battalion
- 302nd Reconnaissance Company
- 403rd Sapper Battalion
- 603rd Signal Battalion (later 1453rd Signal Company)
- 364th Medical/Sanitation Battalion
- 530th Chemical Defense (Anti-gas) Company
- 263rd Motor Transport Company
- 446th Field Bakery
- 911th Divisional Veterinary Hospital
- 1682nd Field Postal Station
- 1088th Field Office of the State Bank

Maj. Gen. Nikolai Ivanovich Biryukov was appointed as commander on the same day the division was redesignated. He had previously commanded the 186th Rifle Division alongside the 1st formation of the 214th in the fighting around Vitebsk and Nevel before being wounded and hospitalized. The division got about five months for training and equipping until it was assigned to the 1st Reserve Army in the Reserve of the Supreme High Command in May 1942. It was still part of that Army on July 10 when it became 64th Army in Stalingrad Front.

=== Defense of Stalingrad ===
Within 24 hours orders arrived from Stalin moving the 214th, along with the 229th and 29th Rifle Divisions, to 62nd Army to defend the line around Stalingrad proper. Due to the growing crisis of the German advance toward the city, on July 12 these orders were countermanded and the three divisions returned to 64th Army, which was under command of Lt. Gen. V. I. Chuikov. By late on July 21 Chuikov had deployed the three divisions on his sector south of the Chir River and west of the Don along with the 154th Naval Rifle Brigade and part of 121st Tank Brigade. On the evening of the following day he reported that the forward elements of the 214th and the 29th were engaging German forces along the Tsimla River. The 214th faced the 71st Infantry Division and by the end of the month had been forced back across the Don south of Nizhne-Chirskaya despite an attempt to counterattack on the 28th. Meanwhile, beginning on July 26 the 4th Tank Army began arriving to the north in the small bend of the Don.

During the first ten days of August the 64th Army, now under command of Lt. Gen. M. S. Shumilov, was gradually pushed to the north and east, and by August 10 the division was helping to defend the lower reaches of the Aksai River. By this time the attacking 4th Panzer Army was broken and in need of reinforcements and replenishment. However the 4th Tank Army to the north was under heavy pressure from German 6th Army west of the Don, and by August 15 the 214th was being regrouped at Kotluban Station in preparation for recrossing the river at Vertyachy and attacking westward toward Rodionov. This effort faltered from the outset as the German forces continued advancing and constricting the Red Army bridgeheads on the west bank. By the end of August 16 the 4th Tank Army was effectively defeated and its remnants were fleeing east of the Don through those bridgeheads that were still held; before long it would be derisively referred to as the "4 Tank Army".

While this was going on the 534th and 535th Regiments of VIII Army Corps' 384th Infantry Division stormed across the Don at Akatov and seized a bridgehead on the east bank. In what one German war correspondent described as "one of the most senseless actions of the war," for eight days this division, reinforced overnight on August 17/18 by elements of 389th Infantry Division, fought a vicious battle with the 214th, 39th Guards and 98th Rifle Divisions, supported by the 193rd Tank and 22nd Motorized Rifle Brigades and 468th Antitank Regiment. By the time the fighting ended the two German divisions had suffered more than 300 dead, only to see the Army commander, Gen. F. Paulus, abandon part of the bridgehead and conduct his main attack on Stalingrad farther south. During this battle the 214th came under command of 4th Tank Army.

On August 21 the 6th Army began its drive to the Volga and Stalingrad from Vertyachy. The Red Army General Staff's report on the morning of the next day stated in part:

214th RD and 193rd TB fought a fierce battle with the enemy along a line from the Panshinka River to the western outskirts of Verkhne-Gnilovskii [5km south of Trekhostrovskaia and due east of Akatov] all day on 21 August. A battalion of enemy infantry with 8 tanks captured Verkhne-Gnilovskii and was advancing toward Panshino.

The report on August 23 noted that the two units were defending the line from Lake Krivoe to the northern outskirts of Verkhne-Gnilovskii. That day the floodgates opened and while the combat-effective elements of 4th Tank Army continued attacking at Akatov the main forces of XIV Panzer Corps rolled east and reached the Volga before nightfall. The 214th was driven north of this corridor and while two of its rifle regiments supported the remnants of the 39th Guards and the 98th Division on its northwestern face its third regiment helped the 35th Guards and 87th Rifle Divisions establish defenses between Kotluban and Bolshaya Rossoshka.

=== First Kotluban Offensive ===
Army Gen. G. K. Zhukov was made deputy commander-in-chief of the Soviet Armed Forces on August 26 and he soon arrived in the Stalingrad area to take overall charge of the defense. He saw the long German corridor from the Don to the Volga as vulnerable and he immediately began planning an offensive to cut it off. The main effort was to be made by 1st Guards Army beginning at dawn on September 3, but was preceded by a supporting attack by the 214th, 27th Guards and 298th Rifle Divisions on September 2 against the 384th and 76th Infantry Divisions. This failed miserably in the face of effective counterattacks. The 1st Guards' attack achieved only meagre success. The offensive was renewed on September 5 with 4th Tank Army attempting to reach Vertyachy. By day's end the 214th was reported as having reached the east bank of the Don near Lake Kalach by 2000 hours and then engaging in fighting on the outskirts of Verkhne-Gnilovskii. Although the offensive persisted until September 13 it had effectively stalled on its fourth day.

== Operation Uranus and Operation Ring ==
Operation Uranus. Note positions of 24th Army.

As of the beginning of October the division was still in 4th Tank Army but on the 22nd this began to be converted to the 65th Army. As part of the reorganization the division was transferred to 24th Army in the newly created Don Front. It was still in this Army, commanded by Lt. Gen. I. V. Galanin, during the planning and buildup for the offensive that would encircle German 6th Army in and around Stalingrad. Most of Galanin's divisions had been worn down in the Kotluban offensives; in addition it was spread along a wide sector from Kotluban to Kuzmichi and lacked armor until after the offensive began so was limited to holding attacks in the operational plan. Don Front's part in the offensive began on November 19 but 24th Army did not join in until the morning of the 22nd, the same day the Red Army pincers would complete the encirclement at Kalach-na-Donu. It began its assault from jumping-off positions at and east of the town of Panshino on the east bank of the Don, 4km northeast of Verkhne-Gnilovskii. Its shock group consisted of the 214th and 49th Rifle Divisions, supported on the left by one regiment of the 298th and on the right by two regiments of the 120th Rifle Division, attacking on a roughly 8km-wide sector from 12km southeast to 3km north of Verkhne-Gnilovskii. The two leading divisions were concentrated on a 4.5km-wide line in the center of the sector and were to attack concentrically toward the southwest and south to penetrate the defenses of 76th Infantry Division and then advance with reinforcements to seize Verkhne-Gnilovskii and pave the way for the commitment of 16th Tank Corps. Despite an artillery preparation the ground assault faltered almost immediately under heavy German artillery, mortar and machine gun fire. The commander of the Front, Lt. Gen. K. K. Rokossovskii, commented on this failure:

Certainly the 24th Army assisted the overall operation to some degree by pinning down and attracting to itself considerable enemy forces. Nor can the army commander, Galanin, be blamed entirely for the failure. No doubt he made some mistakes, but the fact of the matter is that the army simply lacked the strength to overcome so strong an enemy defense.

In fact at the end of the day Paulus ordered a regiment of 384th Infantry Division to reinforce 76th Infantry, and the attack also influenced his decision to pull his XI Army Corps east of the Don, farther into developing trap.

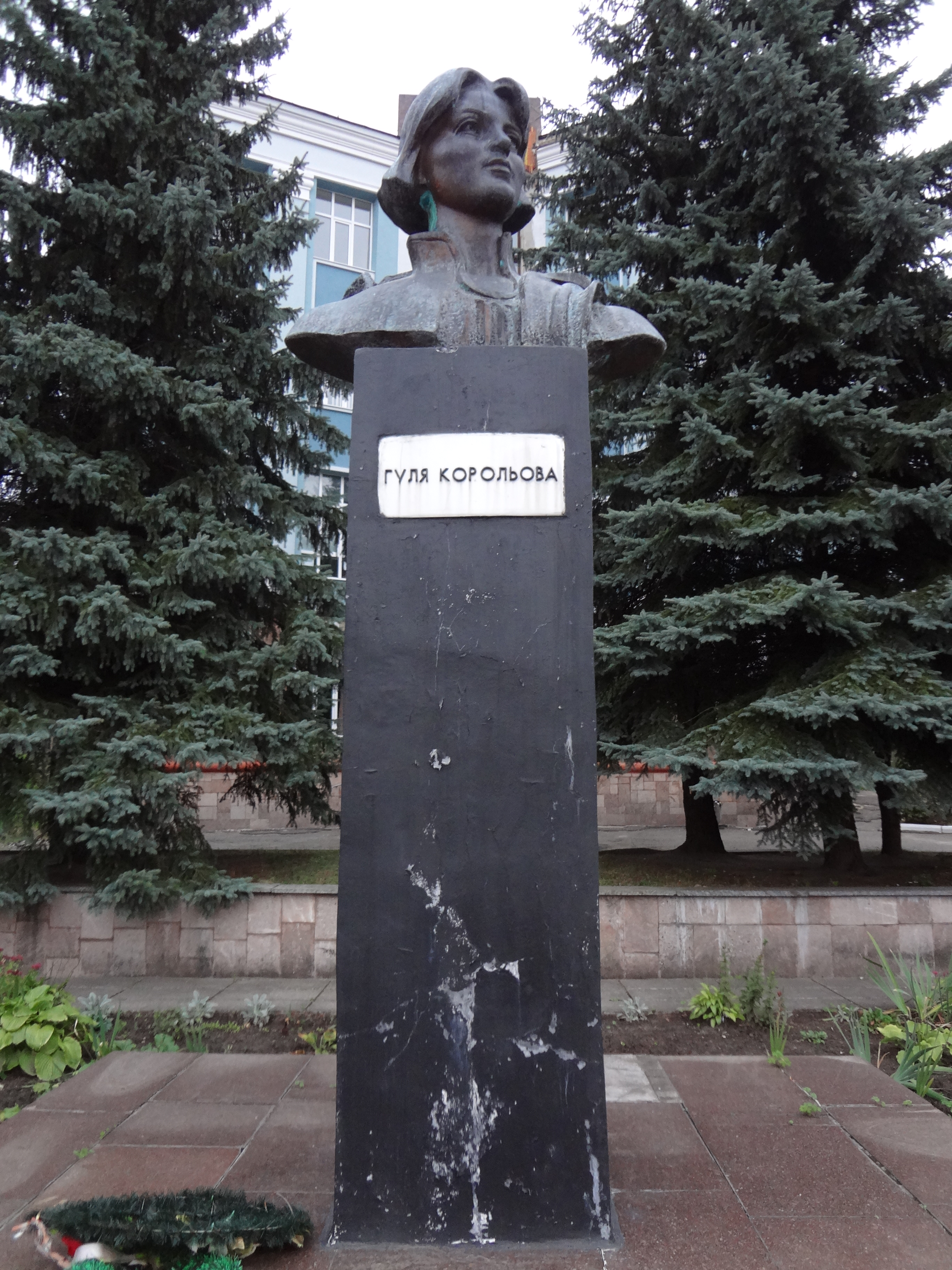
Monument to M. V. Korolyova in Rivne

Galanin renewed his attack on November 23 but with several changes. The 16th Tank Corps was ordered to deploy two of its brigades as direct support for the shock group's rifle divisions. In the event this proved ineffective as the tanks ran into both Soviet and German minefields that had not been cleared as well as antitank fire; during the day it had 55 vehicles knocked out or destroyed. In the summary of the days' fighting it was stated that "after encountering strong and well-organized enemy fires, [the Army] achieved no success and was fighting in its previous positions." During the attack Krasnoarmeets M. V. Korolyova, a former child film actor and now a medical instructor of the 780th Rifle Regiment, evacuated 50 wounded from the field before leading her comrades into the German trenches, killing or wounding at least 15 with grenades before being mortally wounded. She would be posthumously awarded the Order of the Red Banner.

The following day Galanin committed the third brigade of tanks in the infantry support role, as well as the fresh 84th Rifle Division between the 214th and 49th but gained no more than 4km at a cost of another 33 tanks. On November 25 the STAVKA registered its disapproval, stating, "The infantry... did not attack and remained lying down in front of the barbed wire," leaving the tanks "sitting ducks" for the German gunners. By November 25 the failures of 24th Army were generating heated exchanges between Galanin and the commander of 65th Army, Lt. Gen. P. I. Batov, as to who was at fault. The former renewed his attack on November 25 with the same shock group, now backed by the 233rd Rifle Division, and the depleted 16th Tanks still in the direct support role in the Panshino area, but again made minimal progress. Thereafter, in two days of heavy fighting, the Army captured Verkhne- and Nizhne-Gnilovskii but remained 8km north of its initial objective, Vertyachy. By this time the 16th Tanks had fewer than 20 vehicles still operational and the gains made by the Army were mostly attributable to the successes of 65th Army on its west flank forcing German withdrawals.

=== Operation Ring ===
By December 9 it was becoming clear that the operations necessary to eliminate 6th Army would require reinforcements, specifically the 2nd Guards Army which was en route. Until then the Don Front would be limited to pinning attacks to help prevent a German breakout. This prospect became more alarming on December 12 when 4th Panzer Army began a concentrated drive toward Stalingrad, which forced the STAVKA to divert the 2nd Guards to block it. Operation Ring (Koltso) was put on hold. As of December 16 the 214th was in the 24th Army's reserves. On December 19, as the advancing LVII Panzer Corps reached the Myshkova River south of the pocket, the 27th Guards and the 214th, supported by tanks, went over to the attack against the right wing of 44th Infantry Division west of State Farm (Sovkhoz) No. 1. Although the attack was contained the 44th suffered heavier than usual losses over that day and the next. These losses influenced Paulus' decision to not attempt to break out of the pocket.

Before the new year the 214th was transferred again, now to 65th Army. After Operation Winter Storm had been defeated the fate of 6th Army was sealed, but much bitter fighting remained during January 1943. Don Front began more active operations on January 6 and the division made another attack on 44th Infantry which captured the main battle line of its 131st Regiment, a breach that required the intervention of a battalion of the 376th Infantry Division to contain, although the division held the captured ground. The 44th had suffered a further 130 casualties and by the next day the breach in its defenses had been widened to 1.5km. The 27th Guards joined the attack on January 7 and by the end of the next day the 44th had lost 480 men in three days of fighting and was close to being combat-ineffective.

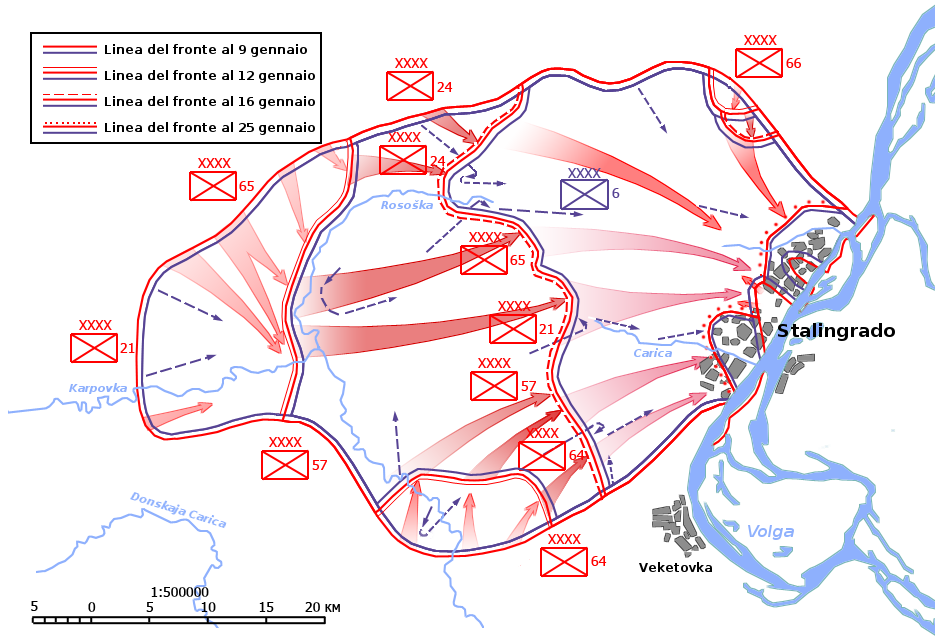
Operation Ring

Rokossovskii issued a surrender ultimatum to 6th Army on January 8 which was rejected out of hand, as expected. Following this he made his final dispositions for Operation Ring which was to begin on January 10. The 214th was allocated to 65th Army's shock group along with four other rifle divisions, the 91st Tank Brigade, and six Guards heavy tank regiments (KV tanks). The division, advancing on the Army's left flank, was directly allocated two regiments of medium/heavy artillery. The artillery preparation began at 0805 hours and lasted 55 minutes. Despite stubborn resistance initially the Army's shock group soon overwhelmed 44th Infantry and its supporting battalions from the 76th and 113th Infantry Divisions. The 214th and 27th Guards, again operating in tandem but now working with about 30 tanks of 91st Tanks and the 9th and 10th Guards Heavy Tanks, rolled over and through six battalions defending on 44th Infantry's right wing, capturing the western portion of State Farm No. 1, Hill 117.5 and the territory north of and east along the Golaya Balka. The attack was finally contained by a battalion of the 113th and small groups of tanks but not before the two divisions had gained from 4.5-7km, leaving the 44th Infantry reduced to remnants.

The next day the division joined with the 84th Rifle Division of 24th Army and the 8th Guards Tank Regiment to hold Hill 117.5 against expected counterattacks while also clearing the remainder of State Farm No. 1 and reaching the Rossoshka River north and south of Zapadnovka. The fighting degenerated into a deadly slugfest against two battalions of the 76th Infantry Division and remnants of the 44th, backed by a handful of self-propelled guns. The attackers, including two other divisions of 24th Army, gained between 500m and 2km while finally clearing the Sovkhoz on January 12, after which the 84th and 214th pursued 1-2km eastward to Zapadnovka and Vlasovka in the Rossoshka valley.

Despite these successes it was clear that 21st Army on the 65th's right was making greater progress so it was reinforced for January 13 while the 214th was ordered to anchor the 65th's left flank at Zapadnovka. The following day it remained in the same positions as 21st Army prepared for a decisive thrust. After the storm broke on January 15 the 214th advanced to Bolshoi Rossoshka while 21st Army seized Pitomnik Airfield on the 16th. At the end of the following day Rokossovskii called a halt to rest and replenish his forces.

==== Battle for the City ====
The lull in operations ended on January 21 although the main attack did not begin until 1000 hours the following day. Following a brief rest the 214th returned to the front lines on January 25 again on the left flank of 65th Army east of Gorodishche facing the hollowed-out 113th Infantry. The next day, in conjunction with 23rd Rifle Division it pushed that division along the south bank of the Mechetka River to within 1,000m of the western edge of Barrikady village. On the same day the Stalingrad pocket was cut in two by elements of 21st Army. By the 28th the division was facing the 76th Infantry in the village and over the next two days cleared its northwestern sector after difficult fighting with a German group encircled in the Vishnevaia Balka, taking many prisoners and forcing the 76th northeastward across Skulpturinyi Street. By this time the divisions of 65th Army were averaging 1,000-2,000 "bayonets" (infantry and sappers) each.

The southern pocket surrendered on January 31 but the next day the roughly 50,000 German troops in the northern pocket were still holding out. A massive artillery bombardment, followed by airstrikes, began at about 0700 hours. The 214th went over to the attack at 1000 hours, pushing eastward against remnants of the 76th and 113th Infantry and 60th Motorized Divisions. The division's forward elements thrust into the vicinity of Silikat Factory No. 3 between the upper Barrikady and upper Tractor Factory villages. By 2130 hours radio messages from within the pocket indicated that Soviet forces had torn gaping holes in the perimeter and that up to 20,000 men had gone missing. The following day the northern pocket officially surrendered. General Batov assigned the 67th Guards and 214th to mop up the factory district.

On 3 February... [t]he division of Biryukov concentrated on Verkhovnianskaia Street side by side with the men of Merkulov's division. They seized 600 prisoners that day. We, accompanied by Colonel Prozorov, went into the ruins... Approaching, we quietly peeped into a shallow shaft of concrete. On the bottom, wrapped up in unimaginable clothes, sat three German officers dealing cards... "Hands up." The Germans obediently stood up. The trump card flew into the snow. The game had ended.

The same day the STAVKA ordered the headquarters of 65th Army to prepare to move northwards and the 214th was transferred to the Stalingrad Group of Forces. Unlike the majority of divisions that took part in the final battles for Stalingrad it did not receive the Guards designation.

== Into Ukraine ==
In orders issued on February 28 by the STAVKA the forces of the Stalingrad Group were reassigned. The 214th went back to 24th Army, which was now in the Valuyki region in the Reserve of the Supreme High Command. Along with the other divisions it was to be replenished with personnel, horses, weapons and other equipment to bring it up to a strength of 8,000 men. In further orders on March 11 the 24th Army was assigned to a new Reserve Front, behind the Central and Voronezh Fronts, effective March 13.

The division remained in the Reserve over the following months, being transferred to the 53rd Army in the Steppe Military District in May. General Biryukov left the division on June 2 to take command of the 80th Guards Rifle Division; he was replaced by Maj. Gen. Pavel Petrovich Demin on June 4. Biryukov went on to command the 20th Guards Rifle Corps, gaining the rank of lieutenant general in April 1945, the same month he was made a Hero of the Soviet Union. Demin was an NKVD officer who had previously commanded the 80th Guards.

=== Operation Polkovodets Rumyantsev ===
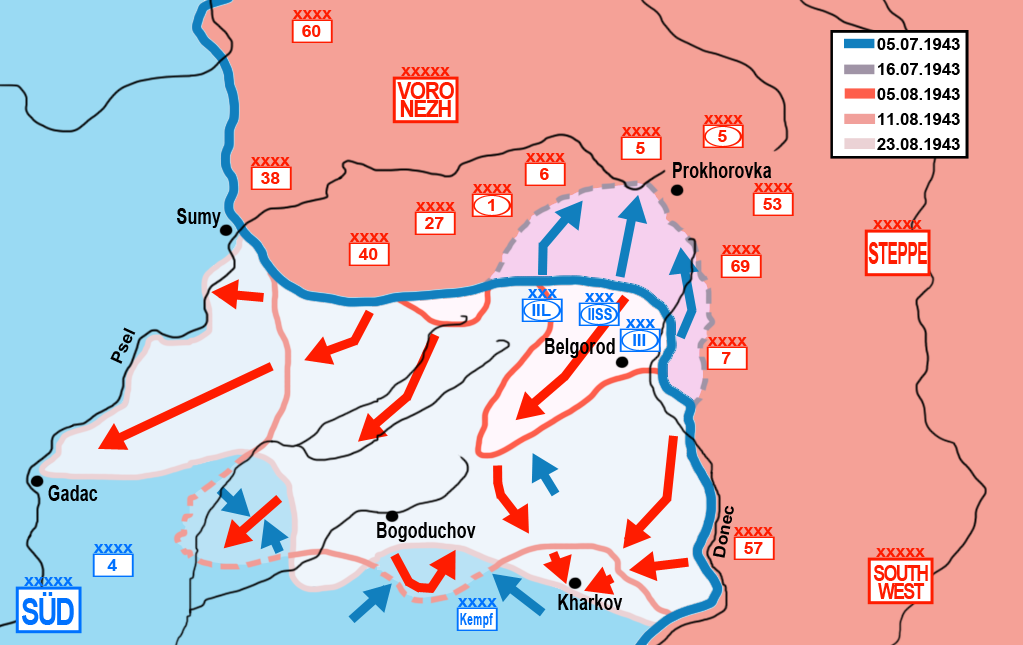
Operation Polkovodets Rumyantsev

Once the STAVKA took the decision to await a German offensive against the Kursk salient the armies of Steppe Military District (as of July 9 Steppe Front) became both a longstop defense force and a reserve for the eventual counteroffensive. By mid-May the 53rd Army was digging in along the Kshen River on a sector from Nikolskoe to Prilepy. The German offensive in the south began on July 5 and was effectively halted by July 12. On August 1 General Demin handed his command to Col. Yakov Ipatevich Brovchenko; Demin was attached to 53rd Army before furthering his military education and ended the war in command of 3rd Rifle Division. For the counteroffensive, Operation Polkovodets Rumyantsev, the Front commander, General I. S. Konev, formed a shock group consisting of 53rd Army and the 48th Rifle Corps of 69th Army. These were deployed on an 11km-wide front from Glushinskii to Visloe for an attack to begin on August 3. 53rd Army had three reinforced divisions in first echelon with four divisions and 1st Mechanized Corps in second.

The counteroffensive started as planned, preceded by a complex artillery preparation from 0500 to 0815 hours. The shock group faced stubborn trench fighting until 1500 when 1st Mechanized was committed and completed the breakthrough of the main German defensive zone. In all the 53rd Army advanced 7-9km by day's end. On August 4 the Army broke through the second and third defensive zones which covered Belgorod from the north. For the next day it was ordered "to speed up the offensive in the general direction of Mikoyanovka." In accordance it pushed the defenders out of the Streletskoye and Bolkhovets strongpoints, breaking through the fourth defensive line and reached a line from Vodyanoe to Krasnoe; the 89th Guards and 305th Rifle Divisions of 69th Army cleared Belgorod by 1800 hours.

=== Battles for the Dniepr ===
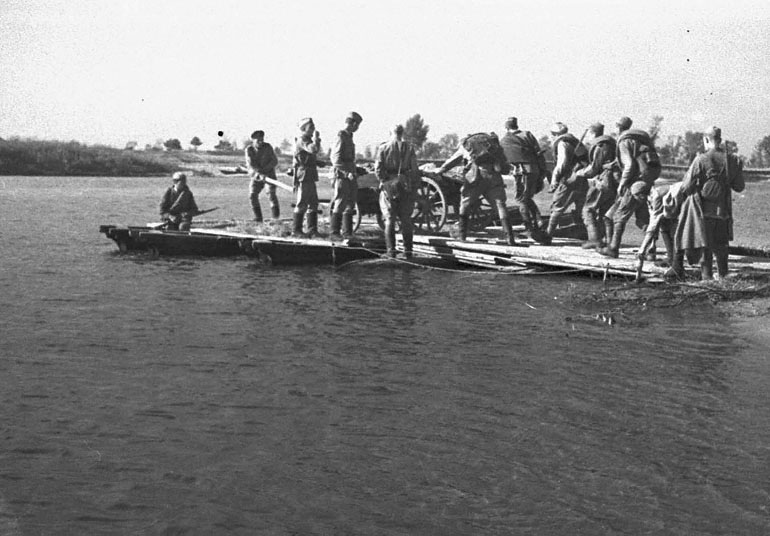
Soviet soldiers crossing the Dniepr on improvised rafts

With the liberation of Belgorod and later Kharkov on August 23 the Red Army embarked on an offensive to clear the remainder of eastern Ukraine. Steppe Front advanced toward Poltava and, after that city was taken, continued on toward Kremenchuk. This was one of the five crossing points over the Dniepr available to Army Group South as it withdrew to the so-called Wotan line. On September 26 the Front made three improvised crossings between Kremenchuk and Dnepropetrovsk which, over the next few days were expanded to a single bridgehead 50km wide and up to 16km deep. The 214th was by now in the 75th Rifle Corps of 53rd Army. It played a main role in this fighting and received its first battle honor:

KREMENCHUG – ...214th Rifle Division (Col. Brovchenko, Yakov Ipatevich)... The troops that participated in the liberation of Kremenchug, by order of the Supreme Commander-in-Chief of 29 September 1943 and a commendation in Moscow, are given a salute of 12 artillery salvoes by 120 guns.

On October 9 Brovchenko was replaced in command by Col. Grigorii Nikitich Zhukov. This officer had served as deputy commander of the division earlier in the year before moving to the 299th Rifle Division as its acting commander for several weeks.

In the first weeks of October General Konev shifted his 5th Guards Army to the bridgehead south of the city that was being held by 53rd Army. The Kremenchug-Pyatikhatki Offensive began on October 15 when a dozen rifle divisions attacked out of the bridgehead and by the next day Konev had three armies across the river, tearing open the left flank of 1st Panzer Army. On October 18 Piatykhatky was liberated, cutting the main railroads to Dnepropetrovsk and Kryvyi Rih, which was the obvious next objective. The lead elements of Steppe Front (as of October 20 2nd Ukrainian Front) reached the outskirts of Kryvyi Rih but were counterattacked on the 27th by the XXXX Panzer Corps, driving them back some 32km and doing considerable damage to the Red Army formations in the process. In the course of this operation the 214th was reassigned to 5th Guards Army, moving between the 32nd Guards and 33rd Guards Rifle Corps, but ending October in the former.

=== Battles in the Dniepr Bend ===
On November 13 the 2nd Ukrainian Front gained several small bridgeheads on both sides of Cherkasy and quickly expanded the one north until it threatened to engulf the city and tear open the front of German 8th Army. Ten days later, with gaps in its front lines around the Cherkasy bridgehead and north of Kryvyi Rih, the chief of staff of that Army pleaded for permission to stage a general withdrawal but this was denied. During November and the first three weeks of December Konev was content to fight a battle of attrition with the 1st Panzer and 8th Armies which he could better afford, gradually clearing the right bank of the Dniepr north to Cherkasy.

In the course of this fighting the 780th Rifle Regiment was involved in a battle for the village of Novoaleksandrovka near Kirovograd. On November 29 the Regiment was counterattacked by infantry and tanks. Krasnoarmeets Ivan Ivanovich Spichak was wounded in the arm but refused to be evacuated. When one tank attempted to crush him and his comrades in their trench he was successful in knocking it out with an antitank grenade; he then disabled two more armored vehicles and killed or wounded a number of German soldiers with machine gun fire. In further fighting the next day at the village of Dikovka, Spichak was severely wounded. As his position was being rushed in an effort to take him prisoner he used another antitank grenade to blow up both himself and as many as 25 of the enemy. On February 22, 1944 he would be posthumously made a Hero of the Soviet Union.

As the campaign continued the division was awarded its second honorific for its part in the liberation of Aleksandriya on December 6. Four days later it was also rewarded with the Order of the Red Banner. On the same day it returned to 53rd Army, joining its 48th Rifle Corps, then moving back to the 75th Corps, before going back to 32nd Guards Corps in 5th Guards Army on December 30.

Uman–Botoșani Offensive. Note advance of 5th Guards Army.

General Konev threw a powerful blow on January 5, 1944 at the boundary between the German 8th Army and the reconstituted 6th Army. 5th Guards Army and 7th Mechanized Corps formed the northern shock group in the thrust toward Kirovograd. Rapidly moving northward the shock group penetrated nearly to the city in a matter of hours and the next day the XXXXVII Panzer Corps was encircled; it was forced to break out to the west on January 8. On January 26 the 214th was moved back to 53rd Army, still in 2nd Ukrainian Front, where it was again assigned to 75th Corps but came under direct Army command on February 1. This Army was not directly involved in the encirclement battle around Korsun-Shevchenkovskii but advanced south of the pocket in the direction of Zlatopil. On February 5 the division was again assigned to 48th Corps and on the 14th this Corps was moved to 5th Guards Army. On February 6 Colonel Zhukov left the division, being temporarily replaced by Maj. Gen. Vasilii Dmitrievich Karpukhin until the 18th, and was promoted to the rank of major general on the 22nd. Zhukov would remain in command into the postwar, being made a Hero of the Soviet Union on May 29, 1945. On March 18 the 214th was again reassigned, now to 33rd Guards Corps.

=== First Jassy–Kishinev Offensive ===
By mid-April the 5th Guards Army was approaching the Dniestr River in the vicinity of Grigoriopol. 33rd Guards Corps (14th Guards, 9th Guards Airborne and the 214th) was on the Army's right (north) flank; the Army was on the far left flank of its Front. The Army commander, Lt. Gen. A. S. Zhadov, had already ordered the Corps to force a crossing of the Dniestr and develop its offensive towards Cimișeni. The Corps faced defenses manned by the German 4th Mountain Division of XXXX Panzer Corps.

The Army began crossing operations, mostly using improvised means, immediately upon reaching the east bank of April 12. The first across was a regiment of 95th Guards Rifle Division of 32nd Guards Corps. 33rd Guards Corps was intended to cross further north, closer to Grigoriopol but all three divisions were unsuccessful overnight on April 12/13. On April 13 and 14 the remainder of 32nd Guards Corps crossed into the 95th Guards' bridgehead and expanded it by capturing the village of Puhăceni and the town of Speia. General Zhadov ordered 33rd Guards Corps into the bridgehead as well, which was completed by the end of April 16. The bridgehead was now about 12km wide and 8km deep and engineering efforts across the river had allowed Zhadov to move tanks and other heavy weapons into it so offensive operations could be resumed in the direction of Chișinău. 33rd Guards Corps was in the northern half of the bridgehead with the 214th on its northern flank.

Zhadov launched his attack at dawn on April 16 after a two-hour artillery and airstrike preparation; the 214th was in the first echelon. After about two hours of fighting the first echelon divisions with armor support overpowered the German 320th Infantry Division's forward security belt and by 0930 hours had torn a hole up to 2km wide and 3km deep in the German defenses. The most significant gains were made in a sector 3-6km south of the village of Delacău where the German second defensive position was breached up to 2km deep. However, at 1030 hours the German forces replied with their own intense artillery fire and airstrikes and a wave of counterattacks that halted 5th Guards Army in its tracks. Further attacks at 1500 hours by 4th Mountain and 294th Infantry and 13th Panzer Divisions did considerable damage to the 95th and 13th Guards Divisions. When the fighting finally died down late on April 17 both sides were thoroughly exhausted and the 5th Guards was back to its starting point. A renewed attack on the 18th made no progress. The bridgehead was reinforced over the following days and a new effort was mounted on April 25 and this time expanded the area of the bridgehead by about one-third; 33rd Guards Corps had advanced 8-10km by May 6. By now it was clear that no successful advance on Chișinău would be made on this axis and 5th Guards was replaced in the bridgehead by 8th Guards Army while the former was redeployed to the northwest for a new assault on Iași in mid-May.

The handover did not go smoothly as the German 6th Army launched new attacks on the bridgehead as it was happening and many of 5th Guards' rifle divisions had to withdraw under enemy fire. Ultimately the Army did not begin concentrating northeast of Iași until May 15 and did not complete the process until the first week of June. This delay, among other events, forced the STAVKA to postpone and later cancel the entire operation.

== Into Poland and Germany ==
Beginning on June 28 the 214th was subordinated to the 27th Guards Rifle Corps, which was acting as the Front's reserve corps. This continued until September 5 when it was moved to the Reserve of the Supreme High Command. By this time the division had lost its identity as a Bashkiri unit; during this month it was noted that its personnel were roughly 50 percent Ukrainian, 25 percent Russian and 25 percent Uzbek. While in the Reserve it was assigned to the 78th Rifle Corps of 52nd Army; it would remain in this Army for the duration of the war.

The division returned to the fighting front on October 30 when 52nd Army joined 1st Ukrainian Front, which was under command of Marshal Konev. 78th Corps consisted of the 214th, 31st and 373rd Rifle Divisions. During the Vistula-Oder Offensive, by January 28, 1945, 52nd Army reached the Oder River on a 60km front north and south of Breslau with the 73rd and 78th Corps in first echelon, and gained two bridgeheads over the river southeast of the city. Over the following week the Front carried out a complicated regrouping in the Breslau area. On February 1, 78th Corps was preparing for its relief from its bridgehead; German forces noticed the movement during daylight hours, which included part of the rear echelon of the 214th, and launched an attack which drove the Corps back several kilometres towards the river. At the start of the Lower Silesian Offensive on February 8 the Army made its main attack on the 20km-wide Luben–Gross Kreidel sector with 48th and 78th Corps, and was backed by the 3rd Guards Tank Army.

=== Lower Silesian Offensive ===
The offensive began at 0930 hours, following a 50-minute artillery preparation. 78th Corps, supported by 7th Guards Tank Corps, made moderate progress, advancing 6km and capturing enemy strongpoints at Muhlredlitz and Merschwitz. On February 9, 78th Corps advanced behind the tanks and overcame weak but unremitting resistance from the 19th Panzer and 408th Infantry Divisions, finally reaching the northern outskirts of Liegnitz. As the advance continued the next day the Corps was forced to deploy its divisions facing southwest to cover its Army's left flank along a sector of 40km from Liegnitz to Rosenthal. This was a potentially dangerous situation as German forces built up in the Breslau area, so Konev redirected the main forces of 3rd Guards Tank Army from its advance on Görlitz to the east against the flank and rear of Breslau. This diversion slowed the pace of 52nd Army's main offensive and by February 15 it went over to the defensive along a 120km front. On February 19 the 214th was recognized both for its role in liberating Sandomierz with the award of the Order of Suvorov, 2nd Degree, and for its part in liberating Częstochowa, Przedbórz and other towns with the Order of Bogdan Khmelnitsky, 2nd Degree.

78th Corps resumed the offensive within 48 hours, but overnight on February 17/18 the 8th Panzer Division was transferred to the Lauban–Lewenberg front in an attempt to halt the advance of the 3rd Guards Tank Army. The 214th was moved up to reinforce that Army's left flank along the Siegersdorf–Naumburg–Lewenberg line, freeing up the 9th Mechanized Corps to help deal with a German breakthrough east of Lauban. By the end of February 21 it was attacking with units of 9th Mechanized and 7th Guards Tank Corps and had advanced its right flank as far as the line Waldau–Siefersdorf–Lewenberg while along its left flank it continued to strengthen the line from Lewenberg to Zobten. The following day elements of the 73rd Rifle Corps were also moved up to support the 3rd Guards Tanks and on February 25 the 214th was reassigned to this Corps. By this time the German forces had been driven west across the Neisse River and the entire 52nd Army consolidated along its east bank, where it would remain until the Berlin operation.

=== Battle of Bautzen and Prague Offensive ===
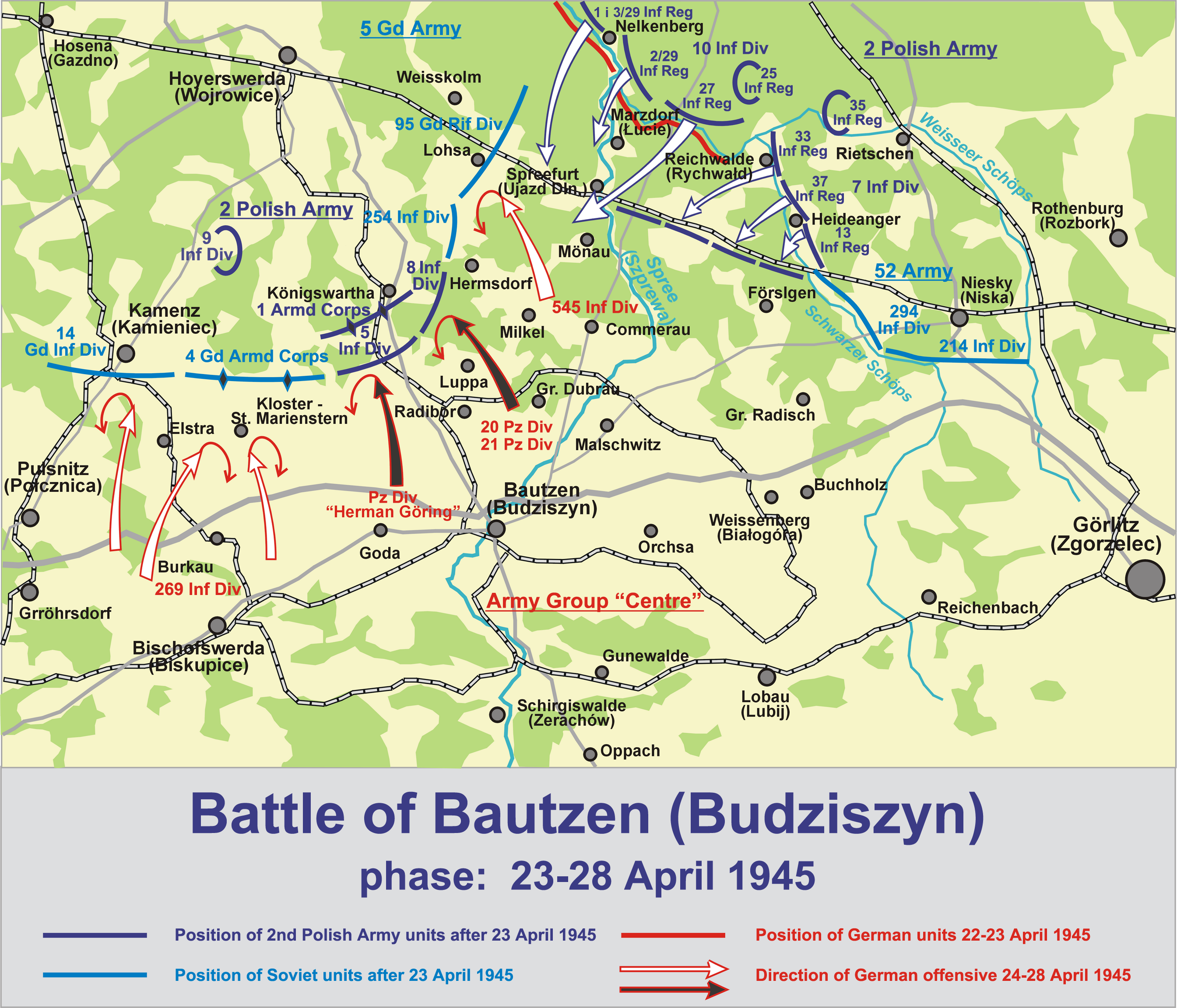
Battle of Bautzen. Note positions of the 214th south of Niesky.

In early April the 214th returned to 78th Corps. At the start of the Berlin offensive on April 16 the forces of 52nd Army were split; four of its divisions formed part of 1st Ukrainian Front's auxiliary shock group, while the remaining five divisions, including the 214th, were deployed on a 101km defensive front along the Neisse from Penzig to Jauer. The Army had the 7th Guards Mechanized Corps in its second echelon. 73rd Rifle Corps, which formed the Army's share of the shock group, quickly forced a crossing of the river despite repeated counterattacks by the Brandenburg Panzergrenadier Division.

On April 20 the 20th Panzer and 72nd Infantry Divisions counterattacked from south of Diehsa and managed to cut the road from Niesky to Bautzen, threatening the communications of 2nd Polish Army. The following day the 214th returned to 48th Corps, which was now part of 52nd Army, and the Corps, backed by 1st Tank Corps, was committed against the German divisions in the area of Spreutz to prevent them getting any farther into the Polish rear. Encountering fierce resistance the combined force made little headway. On April 22 the division, along with the 216th Rifle Division, was ordered to attack Diehsa from the south. The German force carried out a regrouping overnight in order to attack the boundary between 2nd Polish and 52nd Armies which came on the morning of the 23rd. Two infantry divisions reinforced with over 100 tanks and assault guns struck the right flank of 48th Corps on the Ugist axis, with a secondary force moving on Bautzen from the southeast. Under the weight of the attack the Corps was thrown back from its positions and, having been broken up into separate groups, was involved in heavy fighting throughout the day while partially encircled in the area Weisenberg–Ober Prauske–Gross Radisch. The German grouping reached the area south of Klitten.

Having broken the front of 48th Corps the German grouping attempted to develop its offensive northward toward Spremberg on April 24 by committing the Brandenburg Division. By the end of the day the Corps had fallen back in heavy fighting to a line from Spreutz to Jenkendorf. Meanwhile 2nd Polish and 52nd Armies, with reinforcements from 5th Guards Army, managed to stabilize the front. The next day the Corps received orders to attack with the objective of reaching Ober Prauske and Diehsa by the 27th after tying in with 2nd Polish in the Guttau area. After gaining an additional 10km in the Bautzen area on the 26th the German offensive ran out of steam and the entire grouping went over to the defensive on April 30. After the fall of Berlin the 52nd Army took part in the drive on Prague in the final days of the war, during which time the 214th returned to 78th Corps.

== Postwar ==
The men and women of the division ended the war with the full title of 214th Rifle, Kremenchug-Aleksandriya, Order of the Red Banner, Orders of Suvorov and Bogdan Khmelnitsky Division. (Russian: 214-я стрелковая Кременчугская-Александрийская Краснознамённая орденов Суворова и Богдана Хмельницкого дивизия.) Unusually, for such a decorated division, none of its regiments received any similar awards.

Under the terms of STAVKA Order No. 11096, part 7, of May 29, 78th Corps was to withdraw to Kielce, Poland, prior to being transferred with the rest of 52nd Army to the Northern Group of Forces. After relocating to Poland, the Corps was soon further withdrawn with the Army to the Carpathian Military District, with the 214th stationed at Shepetivka. It was disbanded with much of the Army by June 12, 1946.
