= Sakarka =

Sakarka Сакарка
- Khutor
- Location within Volgograd Oblast Location within Russia
- Coordinates: 49°02′N 44°03′E
- Country: Russia
- Region: Volgograd Oblast
- District: Gorodishchensky District
- Time zone: UTC+4:00

Sakarka (Russian: Сакарка) is a rural locality (a khutor) in Panshinskoye Rural Settlement, Gorodishchensky District, Volgograd Oblast, Russia. The population was 235 as of 2010. There are 7 streets.

== Geography ==
Sakarka is located in steppe, 46 km northwest of Gorodishche (the district's administrative centre) by road. Panshino is the nearest rural locality.
