= Studyono-Yablonovka =

Studyono-Yablonovka Студёно-Яблоновка
- Selo
- Location within Volgograd Oblast Location within Russia
- Coordinates: 48°42′N 44°21′E
- Country: Russia
- Region: Volgograd Oblast
- District: Gorodishchensky District
- Time zone: UTC+4:00

Studyono-Yablonovka (Russian: Студёно-Яблоновка) is a rural locality (a selo) in Krasnopakharevskoye Rural Settlement, Gorodishchensky District, Volgograd Oblast, Russia. The population was 258 as of 2010. There are 4 streets.

== Geography ==
Studyono-Yablonovka is located in steppe, on the Tsaritsa River, 22 km southwest of Gorodishche (the district's administrative centre) by road. Tsaritsyn is the nearest rural locality.
