= Sady Pridonya =

Sady Pridonya Сады Придонья
- Settlement
- Location within Volgograd Oblast Location within Russia
- Coordinates: 49°03′N 44°02′E
- Country: Russia
- Region: Volgograd Oblast
- District: Gorodishchensky District
- Time zone: UTC+4:00

Sady Pridonya (Russian: Сады Придонья) is a rural locality (a settlement) in Panshinskoye Rural Settlement, Gorodishchensky District, Volgograd Oblast, Russia. The population was 691 as of 2010. There are 18 streets.

== Geography ==
Sady Pridonya is located on the Panshinka River, 57 km northwest of Gorodishche (the district's administrative centre) by road. Panshino is the nearest rural locality.
