= Kamenny =

Kamenny Каменный
- Settlement
- Location within Volgograd Oblast Location within Russia
- Coordinates: 48°58′N 44°34′E
- Country: Russia
- Region: Volgograd Oblast
- District: Gorodishchensky District
- Time zone: UTC+4:00

Kamenny (Russian: Каменный) is a rural locality (a settlement) and the administrative center of Kamenskoye Rural Settlement, Gorodishchensky District, Volgograd Oblast, Russia. The population was 1,398 as of 2010. There are 24 streets.

== Geography ==
Kamenny is located in steppe, 35 km northeast of Gorodishche (the district's administrative centre) by road. Yerzovka is the nearest rural locality.
