= Vinovka =

Vinovka Виновка
- Selo
- Location within Volgograd Oblast Location within Russia
- Coordinates: 48°52′N 44°39′E
- Country: Russia
- Region: Volgograd Oblast
- District: Gorodishchensky District
- Time zone: UTC+4:00

Vinovka (Russian: Виновка) is a rural locality (a selo) in Yerzkovskoye Urban Settlement, Gorodishchensky District, Volgograd Oblast, Russia. The population was 15 as of 2010.

== Geography ==
Vinovka is located on the right bank of the Volga River, 24 km northeast of Gorodishche (the district's administrative centre) by road. Spartanovka is the nearest rural locality.
