= Varlamov, Gorodishchensky District, Volgograd Oblast =

Varlamov Варламов
- Khutor
- Location within Volgograd Oblast Location within Russia
- Coordinates: 49°01′N 44°19′E
- Country: Russia
- Region: Volgograd Oblast
- District: Gorodishchensky District
- Time zone: UTC+4:00

Varlamov (Russian: Варламов) is a rural locality (a khutor) in Kotlubanskoye Rural Settlement, Gorodishchensky District, Volgograd Oblast, Russia. The population was 622 as of 2010. There are 12 streets.

== Geography ==
Varlamov is located 40 km northwest of Gorodishche (the district's administrative centre) by road. Kotluban is the nearest rural locality.
