= Samofalovka =

Samofalovka Самофаловка
- Settlement
- Location within Volgograd Oblast Location within Russia
- Coordinates: 48°56′N 44°12′E
- Country: Russia
- Region: Volgograd Oblast
- District: Gorodishchensky District
- Time zone: UTC+4:00

Samofalovka (Russian: Самофаловка) is a rural locality (a settlement) and the administrative center of Samofalovskoye Rural Settlement, Gorodishchensky District, Volgograd Oblast, Russia. The population was 1,877 as of 2010. There are 27 streets.

== Geography ==
Samofalovka is located in steppe, 27 km northwest of Gorodishche (the district's administrative centre) by road. Grachi is the nearest rural locality.
