= Zapadnovka =

Zapadnovka Западновка
- Settlement
- Location within Volgograd Oblast Location within Russia
- Coordinates: 48°50′N 44°05′E
- Country: Russia
- Region: Volgograd Oblast
- District: Gorodishchensky District
- Time zone: UTC+4:00

Zapadnovka (Russian: Западновка) is a rural locality (a settlement) with only eight streets, in Rossoshenskoye Rural Settlement, Gorodishchensky District, Volgograd Oblast, Russia. The population was 217 as of 2010. There are 8 streets.

== Geography ==
Zapadnovka is located in steppe, on the right bank of the Rossoshka River, 43 km west of Gorodishche (the district's administrative centre) by road. Rossoshka is the nearest rural locality.
