= 260th Division =

260th Division may refer to:

- 260th Infantry Division, Wehrmacht, Germany
- 260th Rifle Division, Soviet Union

== See also ==
- List of military divisions by number
