= Kuzmichi, Gorodishchensky District, Volgograd Oblast =

Kuzmichi Кузьмичи
- Settlement
- Location within Volgograd Oblast Location within Russia
- Coordinates: 48°53′N 44°21′E
- Country: Russia
- Region: Volgograd Oblast
- District: Gorodishchensky District
- Time zone: UTC+4:00

Kuzmichi (Russian: Кузьмичи) is a rural locality (a settlement) and the administrative center of Kuzmichyovskoye Rural Settlement, Gorodishchensky District, Volgograd Oblast, Russia. The population was 2,357 as of 2010. There are 27 streets.

== Geography ==
Kuzmichi is located 19 km northwest of Gorodishche (the district's administrative centre) by road. Posyolok Oblastnoy selskokhozyaystvennoy opytnoy stantsii is the nearest rural locality.
