= Panshino =

Panshino Паньшино
- Khutor
- Location within Volgograd Oblast Location within Russia
- Coordinates: 49°02′N 44°01′E
- Country: Russia
- Region: Volgograd Oblast
- District: Gorodishchensky District
- Time zone: UTC+4:00

Panshino (Russian: Паньшино) is a rural locality (a khutor) and the administrative center of Panshinskoye Rural Settlement, Gorodishchensky District, Volgograd Oblast, Russia. The population was 1,054 as of 2010. There are 19 streets.

== Geography ==
Panshino is located in steppe, 60 km northwest of Gorodishche (the district's administrative centre) by road. Sady Pridonya is the nearest rural locality.
