= 260th Rifle Division =

- Active: 1st formation: July–November 1941; 2nd formation: April 1942 – June 1946
- Country: Soviet Union
- Branch: Red Army
- Type: Infantry
- Engagements: World War II; 1st formation: Operation Typhoon; 2nd formation: Operation Uranus; Operation Koltso; Operation Kutuzov; Operation Bagration; Vistula–Oder Offensive; East Pomeranian Offensive; Battle of Berlin
- Decorations: Order of the Red Banner (2nd formation); Order of Suvorov (2nd formation)
- Battle honours: Kovel (2nd formation)

The 260th Rifle Division (Russian: 260-я стрелковая дивизия) was an infantry division of the Red Army during World War II, formed twice.

Formed in mid-1941, the division was destroyed during Operation Typhoon later that year. It was reformed in early 1942 and fought in the Battle of Stalingrad, then was relocated to participate in Operation Kutuzov and the advance into eastern Belarus from mid to late 1943. In early 1944 it was again shifted to northwestern Ukraine, advancing into Poland during mid-1944 as part of Operation Bagration. The division received the Order of the Red Banner and the Kovel honorific in recognition of actions in northwestern Ukraine, and in early 1945 participated in the Vistula–Oder Offensive, the East Pomeranian Offensive, and the Berlin Offensive, receiving the Order of Suvorov, 2nd class, for its actions. Remaining in eastern Germany for several months after the end of the war, it was relocated to the Moscow Military District for disbandment in 1946.

== First formation ==
The division began forming on 2 July 1941 near Kalinin, part of the Moscow Military District. It included the 1026th, 1028th, and 1030th Rifle Regiments, as well as the 689th Artillery Regiment. The 260th spent about a month forming near Kalinin, and on 15 August was relocated south to the frontline near Tula, where it joined the 50th Army of the Bryansk Front, under the command of Colonel Vasily Khokhlov. The division fought in the direction of Bryansk and Kaluga. The division was still holding positions there when the German 2nd Panzer Group attacked in Operation Typhoon, the attack beginning the Battle of Moscow. At the time, the 260th fielded 9,755 men, 324 machine guns, 98 artillery pieces and mortars, four anti-aircraft guns, and fifteen anti-tank guns. It was surrounded in the Bryansk pocket but escaped complete destruction. Despite this, only 1,000 officers and men were left in the division by early November. It was withdrawn into the reserve north of Tula, and its remnants were disbanded on 17 November due to a lack of resources to rebuild it since the front was under unrelenting pressure from German attacks.

== Second formation ==
The division was reformed under the command of Colonel Alexander Chizhov between April and 13 May 1942 at Volokolamsk, just west of Moscow in the Moscow Military District, from the 55th Rifle Brigade. It included the 1026th, 1028th, and the 1030th Rifle Regiments, as well as the 738th Artillery Regiment. The 260th was assigned to the Moscow Defense Zone in July, and then to the Voronezh Front reserves in September. In late September it was moved to the front as part of the 1st Guards Army of the Don Front, holding positions to the northwest of Stalingrad. In late September, for "nonfulfillment of military tasks" in the Samofolovka area, Chizhov was relieved of command and demoted to become chief of staff of the 273rd Rifle Division. He was replaced by Colonel Grigory Miroshnichenko, who led the 260th in counterattacks against German troops who had broken through to the Volga from the Samofolovka area. From late September, it led attacks in an attempt to capture Khutor Borodkin. The 1st Guards Army was withdrawn to the Reserve of the Supreme High Command (RVGK) in mid-October, and the division transferred to the 24th Army of the front.

The division fought in the Battle of Stalingrad during Operation Uranus and Operation Koltso between November 1942 and February 1943, successively part of the 24th and 65th Armies of the Don Front. Until January, it fought in the Kotluban area at checkpoint 564. Beginning on 18 January, the 260th advanced on the Barrikady Factory. After the battle ended with the surrender of the German 6th Army in early February, the 260th was transferred to the Don Front reserve, then to the Stalingrad Group of Forces.

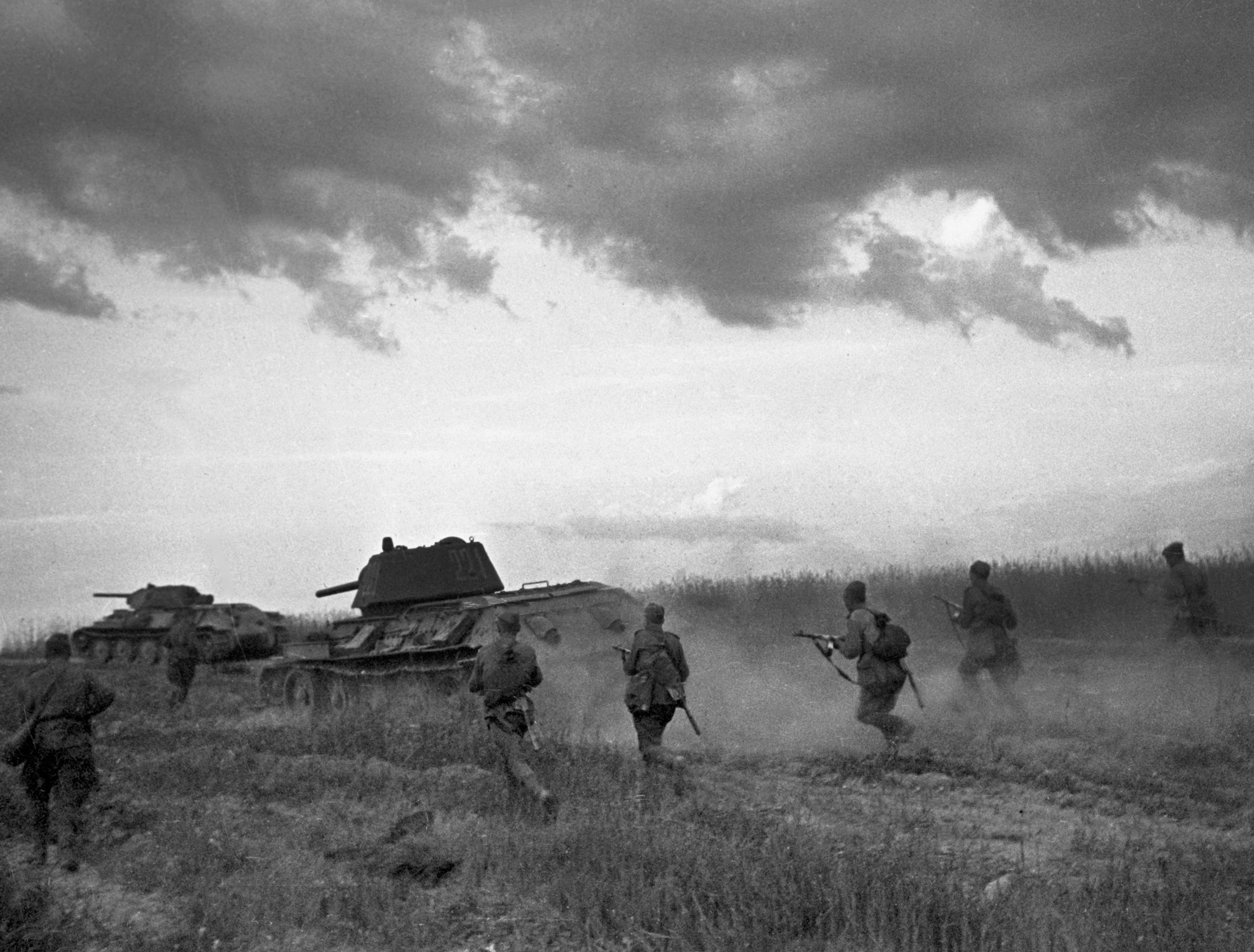
Soviet soldiers during the Bryansk Offensive

At the end of March, the division relocated to the Tula area as part of the 11th Army in the RVGK. The army transferred to the Western Front on 12 July and to the Bryansk Front on 30 July, fighting in Operation Kutuzov and the Bryansk Offensive during the summer offensive. About 18 August Miroshnichenko was seriously wounded and evacuated to a hospital; he was replaced by Colonel Stepan Maximovsky. The 260th became part of the army's 53rd Rifle Corps in August, fighting in battles for Bryansk and the crossing of the Desna River, during which Maximovsky was wounded and evacuated. He was briefly replaced by Colonel Gennady Pankov, who was in turn replaced by Colonel Vasily Bulgakov in November, when it was part of the Belorussian Front during the Gomel–Rechitsa Offensive. During that operation, the division crossed the Sozh River and helped capture Gomel. After it transitioned to the defensive on the approach to Zhlobin and the disbandment of the 11th Army, the division and its corps became part of the 63rd Army. In December the division fought in attacks to the north of Gomel and Zhlobin.

The division transferred back to the RVGK in the Moscow Military District at the end of January, and was briefly assigned to the 70th Army, joining the 125th Rifle Corps, which was in the process of formation, in February. With the corps, the division was sent to the 47th Army of the Belorussian Front in the Sarny area later that month. With the army it fought in attacks towards Kovel. For its actions at Kovel the 260th received the honorific Kovel and the Order of the Red Banner. In May it transferred to the army's 129th Rifle Corps. The 260th fought in Operation Bagration between June and August, crossing the Western Bug and participating in the capture of the Warsaw suburb of Praga during the Lublin–Brest Offensive. In December Bulgakov was replaced by Colonel Ivan Popov after the former departed for courses. At the beginning of January 1945 Colonel Yakov Gorshenin replaced Popov. The division fought in the Warsaw–Poznan Offensive of the Vistula–Oder Strategic Offensive from January 1945, distinguishing itself in the capture of Jabłonna, the crossing of the Vistula, and the battle for Warsaw, and the siege of Bromberg. In February, the division transferred to the army's 77th Rifle Corps. On 6 April it received the Order of Suvorov, 2nd class, for its actions. The division went on to fight in the East Pomeranian Offensive and the Berlin Offensive, in the battles for Deutsch-Krone and Schneidemuhl, the crossing of the Oder and the Havel and the capture of Brandenburg. Gorshenin was demoted promoted to deputy corps commander after late April, being replaced by Major General Pyotr Polyakov. The 260th ended the war with the corps in the Berlin Offensive in May.

Postwar, the division became part of the Group of Soviet Occupation Forces in Germany with the 129th Rifle Corps, still part of the 47th Army. In early 1946, it was transferred to the 7th Rifle Corps of the 3rd Shock Army. In June 1946, the 260th was withdrawn with the corps to the Moscow Military District, where it was disbanded.

== Commanders ==
The following officer commanded the division's first formation:

- Colonel Vasily Khokhlov (2 July–17 November 1941)

The following officers commanded the division's second formation:

- Colonel Alexander Chizhov (13 May–20 August 1942)
- Colonel Grigory Miroshnichenko (30 September 1942–27 August 1943)
- Colonel Stepan Maximovsky (28 August–18 September 1943)
- Colonel Gennady Pankov (19 September–3 November 1943)
- Colonel Vasily Bulgakov (4 November 1943–1 December 1944)
- Colonel Ivan Popov (2 December 1944–2 January 1945)
- Colonel Yakov Gorshenin (3 January 1945–5 May 1945)
- Major General Pyotr Polyakov (6 May 1945–after 9 May 1945)
