= Vertyachy =

Vertyachy Вертячий
- Khutor
- Location within Volgograd Oblast Location within Russia
- Coordinates: 48°56′N 43°54′E
- Country: Russia
- Region: Volgograd Oblast
- District: Gorodishchensky District
- Time zone: UTC+4:00

Vertyachy (Russian: Вертячий) is a rural locality (a khutor) and the administrative center of Vertyachinskoye Rural Settlement, Gorodishchensky District, Volgograd Oblast, Russia. The population was 1,317 as of 2010. There are 19 streets.

== Geography ==
Vertyachy is located in steppe, on the left bank of the Don, 59 km northwest of Gorodishche (the district's administrative centre) by road. Peskovatka is the nearest rural locality.
