= Igar =

- Coat of arms

- Location of Igar in Hungary
- Coordinates: 46.7758°N 18.5149°E
- Country: Hungary
- Region: Central Transdanubia
- County: Fejér

Area
  - Total: 41.19 km^{2} (15.90 sq mi)

Population (2012)
  - Total: 959
  - Density: 23.3/km^{2} (60.3/sq mi)
- Time zone: UTC+1 (CET)
  - Summer (DST): UTC+2 (CEST)
- Postal code: 7015
- Area code: +36 25
- Website: https://igar.hu/

Igar is a village in Fejér county, Hungary.
