= Kotluban =

Kotluban Котлубань
- Settlement
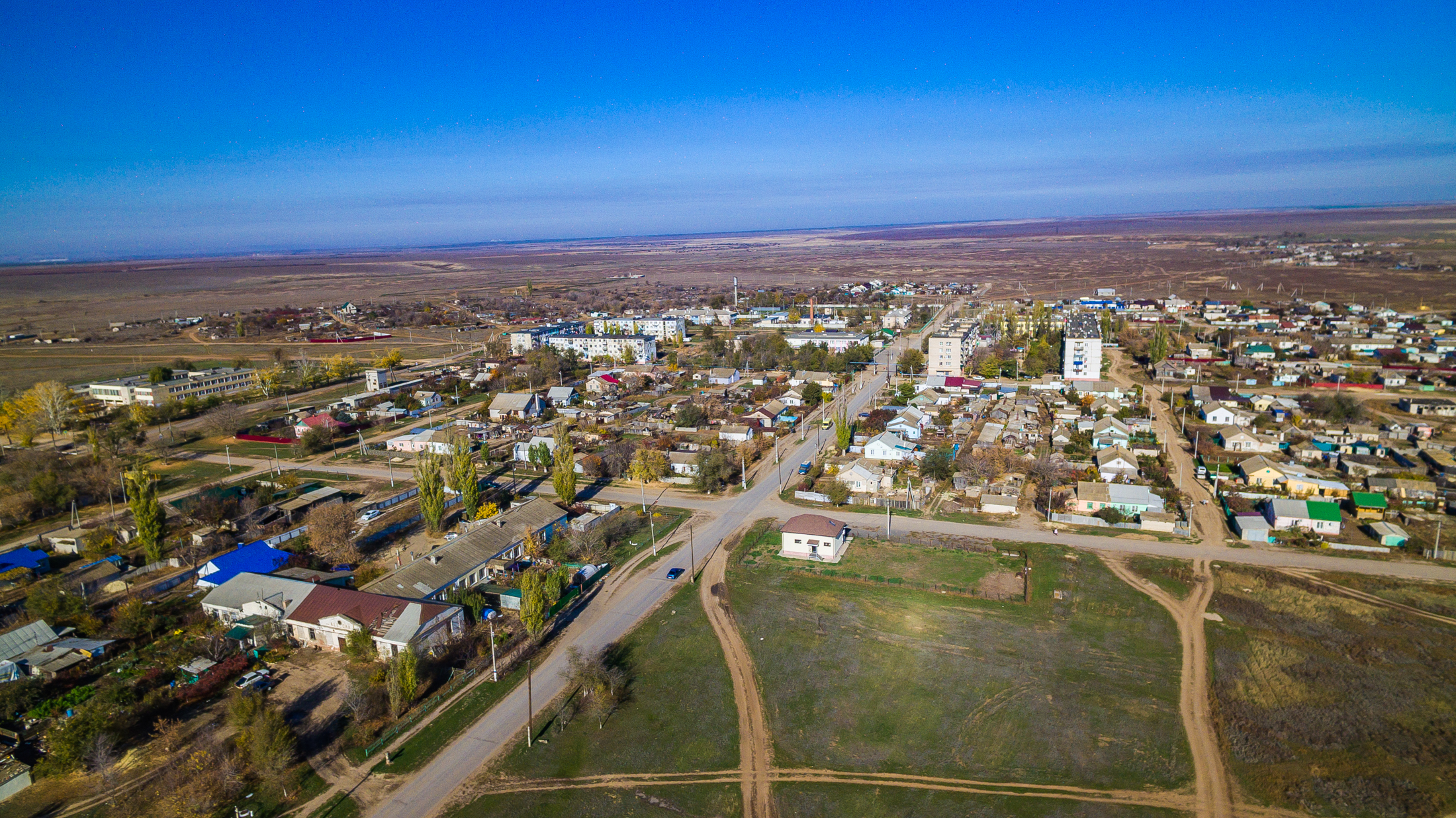
- Kotluban in October 2019

- Location within Volgograd Oblast Location within Russia
- Coordinates: 49°01′N 44°13′E
- Country: Russia
- Region: Volgograd Oblast
- District: Gorodishchensky District
- Time zone: UTC+4:00

Kotluban (Russian: Котлубань) is a rural locality (a settlement) and the administrative center of Kotlubanskoye Rural Settlement, Gorodishchensky District, Volgograd Oblast, Russia. The population was 2,103 as of 2010. There are 40 streets.

== Geography ==
Kotluban is located on the left bank of the Sakarka River, 34 km northwest of Gorodishche (the district's administrative centre) by road. Varlamov is the nearest rural locality.
