= Streletskoye, Yakovlevsky District, Belgorod Oblast =

Streletskoye Стрелецкое
- Selo
- Location within Belgorod Oblast Location within Russia
- Coordinates: 50°43′N 36°17′E
- Country: Russia
- Region: Belgorod Oblast
- District: Yakovlevsky District
- Time zone: UTC+3:00

Streletskoye (Russian: Стрелецкое) is a rural locality (a selo) and the administrative center of Streletskoye Rural Settlement, Yakovlevsky District, Belgorod Oblast, Russia. The population was 798 as of 2010. There are 28 streets.

== Geography ==
Streletskoye is located 23 km southwest of Stroitel (the district's administrative centre) by road. Pushkarnoye is the nearest rural locality.
