= Gorodishche, Volgograd Oblast =

Gorodishche Городище
- Work settlement
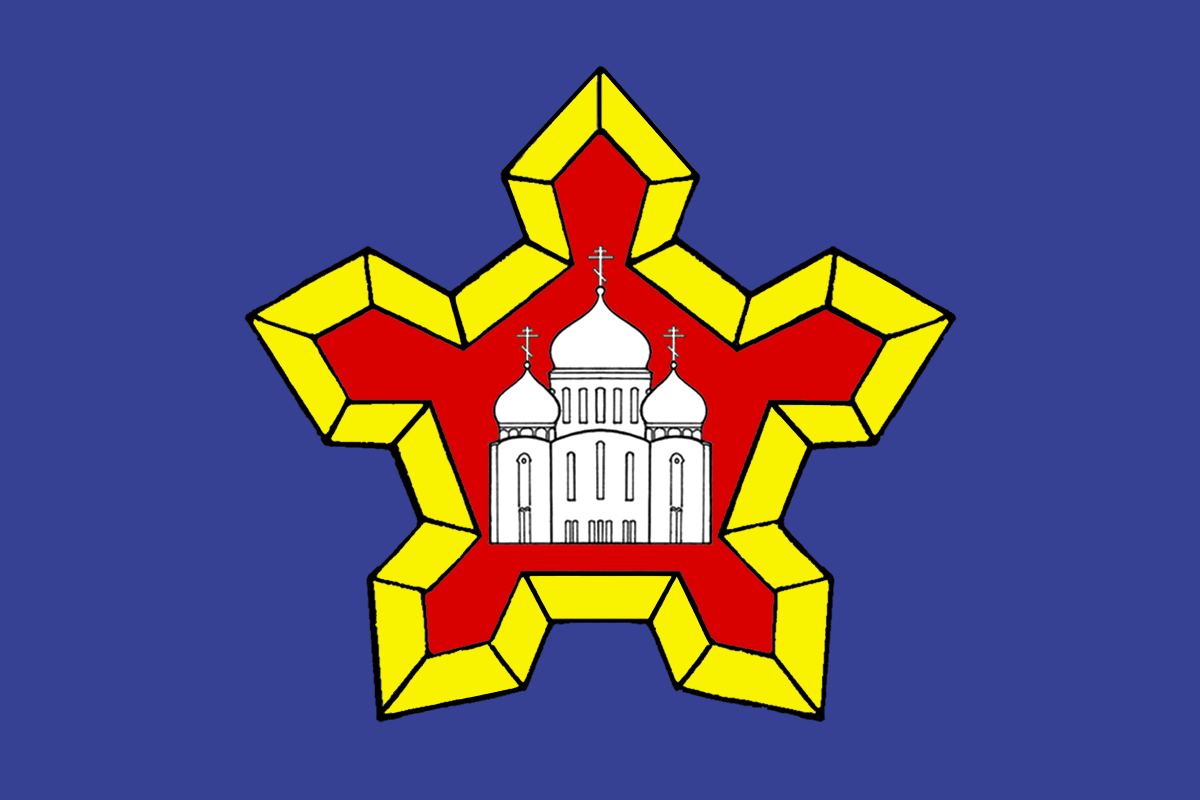
- Flag
- Interactive map of Gorodishche
- Location of Gorodishche Gorodishche (Volgograd Oblast)
- Coordinates: 48°48′N 44°29′E
- Country: Russia
- Federal subject: Volgograd Oblast
- Administrative district: Gorodishchensky District
- Founded: 1827
- Urban-type settlement status since: 1959

Population (2010 Census)
  - Total: 21,381
  - Estimate (1 January 2024): 22,939 (+7.3%)

Administrative status
  - Capital of: Gorodishchensky District
- Time zone: UTC+3 (MSK)
- Postal code: 403000–403003
- OKTMO ID: 18605151051

Gorodishche (Russian: Городи́ще) is an urban locality (a work settlement) and the administrative center of Gorodishchensky District of Volgograd Oblast, Russia, located 10 kilometers (6.2 mi) northwest of Volgograd. Population: 21,381 (2010 census); 19,466 (2002 census); 15,049 (1989 Soviet census).
