= Gorodishchensky District, Volgograd Oblast =

Gorodishchensky District Городищенский район (Russian)
- District
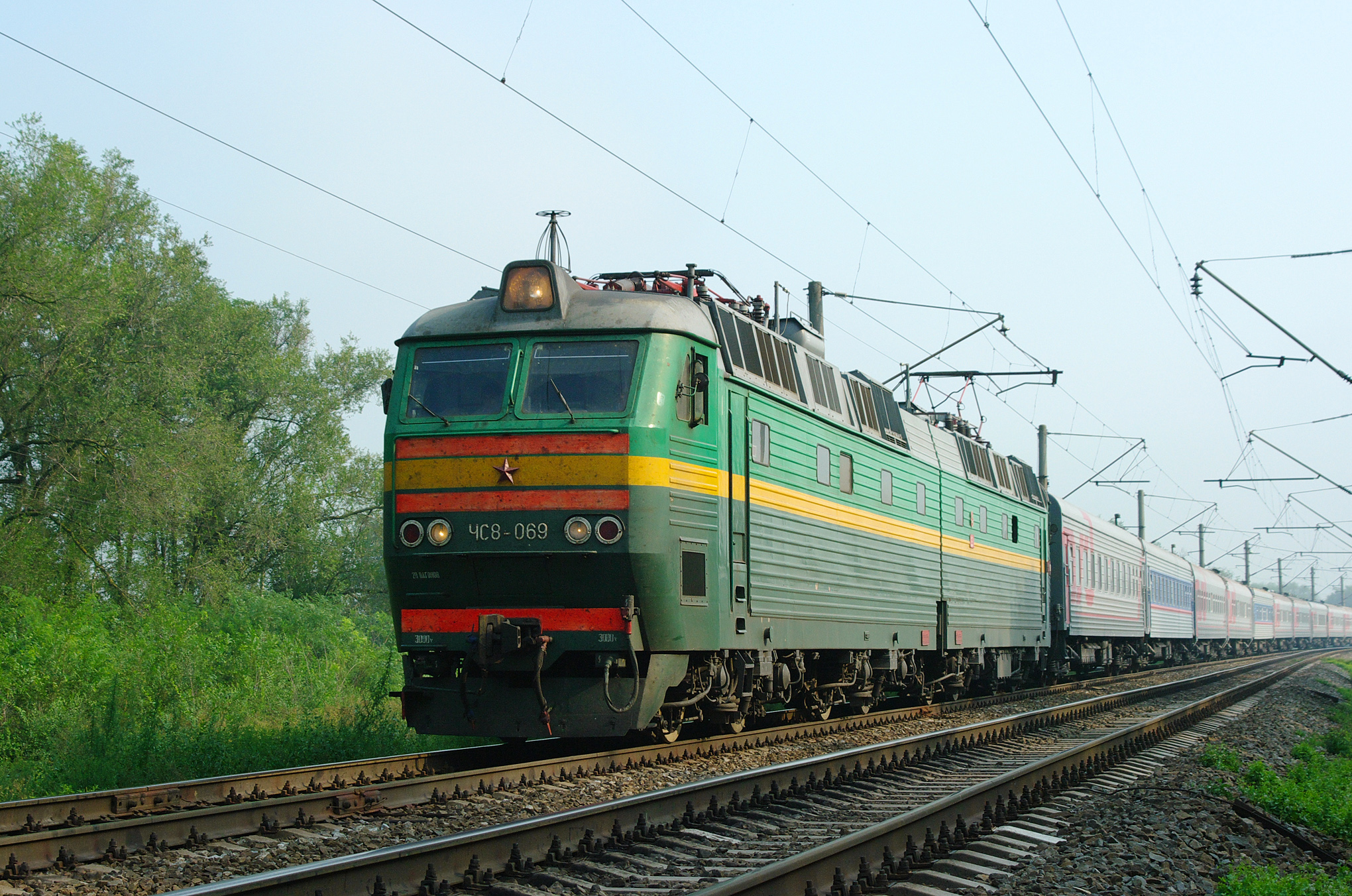
- Electric locomotive ChS8-069 with passenger train near Orlovka, Gorodishchensky District

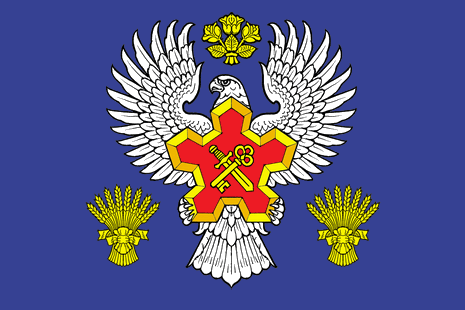
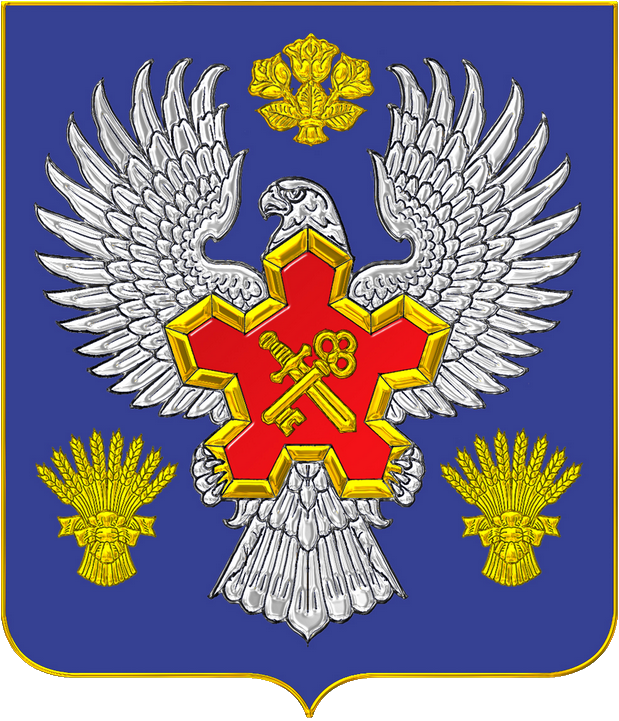
- Flag Coat of arms
- Location of Gorodishchensky District in Volgograd Oblast
- Coordinates: 48°48′N 44°28′E
- Country: Russia
- Federal subject: Volgograd Oblast
- Established: 3 May 1935
- Administrative center: Gorodishche

Area
  - Total: 2,450 km^{2} (950 sq mi)

Population (2010 Census)
  - Total: 60,188
  - Density: 24.6/km^{2} (63.6/sq mi)
  - Urban: 57.6%
  - Rural: 42.4%

Administrative structure
  - Administrative divisions: 3 Urban-type settlements, 15 Selsoviets
  - Inhabited localities: 3 urban-type settlements, 27 rural localities

Municipal structure
  - Municipally incorporated as: Gorodishchensky Municipal District
  - Municipal divisions: 3 urban settlements, 15 rural settlements
- Time zone: UTC+3 (MSK)
- OKTMO ID: 18605000
- Website: http://agmr.ru/

Gorodishchensky District (Russian: Городи́щенский райо́н) is an administrative district (raion), one of the thirty-three in Volgograd Oblast, Russia. As a municipal division, it is incorporated as Gorodishchensky Municipal District. It is located in the southern central part of the oblast. The area of the district is 2,450 square kilometers (950 sq mi). Its administrative center is the urban locality (a work settlement) of Gorodishche. Population: 60,188 (2010 census); 57,308 (2002 Census); 45,982 (1989 Soviet census). The population of Gorodishche accounts for 35.5% of the district's total population.

== Economy ==
The economy of the district is predominantly agricultural.

== Attractions ==
Soldiers' Field Memorial is located in the district.
