= 231st Rifle Division =

231st Rifle Division (February 1942 - November 2, 1942) 231st Rifle Division (July 1, 1943 - September 1945)
- Active: 1942–1945
- Country: Soviet Union
- Branch: Red Army
- Type: Infantry
- Size: Division
- Engagements: Battle of Stalingrad; Kotluban Offensives; Soviet invasion of Manchuria; Battle of Mutanchiang
- Decorations: Order of the Red Banner (2nd Formation)

Commanders
- Notable commanders: Col. Fyodor Maksimovich Rukhlenko; Col. Gavriil Efremovich Odaryuk; Maj. Gen. Yakov Efimovich Timoshenko

The 231st Rifle Division was an infantry division of the Red Army, originally formed out-of-sequence in the Ural Military District in February 1942. It continued training and forming until late May when it was assigned to 8th Reserve Army and began moving toward the Stalingrad area. By the end of August it had reached the fighting front as part of 66th Army in Stalingrad Front and was almost immediately committed to the first of the Kotluban offensives, attempting to cut off the XIV Panzer Corps that had penetrated to the Volga River north of Stalingrad about a week earlier. The division suffered heavy casualties from the outset of these efforts, attacking across flat and open terrain against well dug-in opposition. Devastated in these attacks the 231st was soon relegated to second-echelon duties until, with only about 600 infantry and sappers still on strength, it was officially disbanded on November 2.

A new 231st was formed from a reserve rifle regiment on July 1, 1943 in Primorsky Krai of the Soviet far east. It did not see combat during the next two years but remained in this area, mostly as part of the 87th Rifle Corps of 1st Red Banner Army, observing the border with Japanese-occupied Manchuria. It joined the offensive against Japan on August 9 as part of 59th Rifle Corps, still in 1st Army. The campaign was as much against the terrain as the Japanese forces, but after helping to lead the Corps and its supporting armor through trackless forests it broke into the clear and by the end of the campaign less than two weeks later it had reached Harbin. It was recognized for this accomplishment with the award of the Order of the Red Banner, but was disbanded shortly thereafter.

== 1st Formation ==
A division numbered as the 231st began forming in March 1941 in the Moscow Military District but in May it was disbanded to provide a cadre for the 8th Airborne Brigade of 4th Airborne Corps.

Another division numbered as the 231st began forming in February 1942 at Kungur in the Ural Military District. Its first commander, Col. Fyodor Maksimovich Rukhlenko, was not officially appointed until April 16 and it remained in the District training and equipping its units until May. Once formed, its official order of battle, based on a version of the shtat (table of organization and equipment) of March 18, 1942, was as follows:

- 607th Rifle Regiment
- 623rd Rifle Regiment
- 639th Rifle Regiment
- 1041st Artillery Regiment
- 423rd Antitank Battalion
- 477th Antiaircraft Battery
- 826th Mortar Battalion
- 250th Reconnaissance Company
- 339th Sapper Battalion
- 913th Signal Battalion
- 283rd Medical/Sanitation Battalion
- 189th Chemical Defense (Anti-gas) Company
- 543rd Motor Transport Company
- 386th Field Bakery
- 856th Divisional Veterinary Hospital
- 1845th Field Postal Station
- 1164th Field Office of the State Bank

In late May it was assigned to the 8th Reserve Army in the Reserve of the Supreme High Command and began moving southwestward in the direction of the Don and Volga Rivers.

=== Kotluban Offensives ===
At the start of July the 231st was still one of six rifle divisions in 8th Reserve. The German summer offensive was just beginning and the STAVKA was unclear if the planned objective was toward Moscow or the Caucasus. On August 14 Colonel Rukhlenko left the division; he would later lead the 123rd Rifle Division and then serve as deputy commander of 30th Rifle Corps being promoted to the rank of major general on April 19, 1945. He was replaced the next day by Col. Gavriil Efremovich Odaryuk. This officer had been commandant of Belotserkovsk Infantry School and led the division for the duration of the 1st formation.

On August 21 the XIV Panzer Corps of German 6th Army struck eastward from a bridgehead over the Don River and by the 23rd had reached the Volga and the northern outskirts of Stalingrad in some strength. This seemingly vulnerable corridor, which passed near the village of Kotluban and its railway station, would attract Soviet counterattacks into November. At this time 8th Reserve was in the Kamyshin region roughly 150km north of Stalingrad and late the next day the STAVKA issued the following orders:

1. Form 66th Army, consisting of 231st, 120th, 99th, 49th, 299th, 316th, 207th, and 292nd RDs. 2. Transfer the command of 8th Reserve Army to form the command of 66th Army... 3. Appoint Lieutenant General S. A. Kalinin as the commander of 66th Army, relieving him of his duties as commander of the Volga Military District. Appoint Major General M. I. Kozlov as deputy commander of 66th Army.

The Army would also have three tank brigades, two Katyusha regiments, and a mixed aviation corps under command. The Army, subordinated to Stalingrad Front, was intended to prevent German forces from advancing northward from the Stalingrad region but the Front commander, Col. Gen. A. I. Yeryomenko, was aware that it would take several days to reach its designated assembly areas. In the event the 231st did not join the fighting front until August 31.

By September 3 the Army had lost the 207th and 292nd Divisions but had gained a fourth tank brigade (10th, 69th, 148th and 246th Brigades). On this date the 231st was deployed southeast of Erzovka, facing the boundary between the 3rd Motorized and 16th Panzer Divisions. Late on September 4 the 66th and 24th Armies had still not completed their attack preparations but were ordered to attack regardless at 0900 hours the next day. The mission of 66th Army was to "cut off and destroy the enemy grouping which has penetrated to the Volga by an attack [southward] toward Orlovka." In the report on the first day's fighting the 231st was stated as having reached from the Motor Tractor Station (6km northeast of Orlovka) to Hill 111.2 (8km northeast of Orlovka) but this was one of the few minor successes the Army could record. Overall the offensive had already failed although fruitless efforts were made to revive it until September 13.

A new offensive began on September 18 but this mainly involved the 24th and 1st Guards Armies farther to the west, with the 66th playing a supporting role. This supporting attack was made primarily by the 38th and 41st Guards and 116th Rifle Divisions on the Army's right (west) flank; the 231st was initially still deployed southeast of Erzovka. After failures to gain ground in the early days the boundaries between the armies were substantially altered and the division was moved to the right flank of 24th Army, coming under its command. An effort to reinforce a success by 1st Guards Army on September 24 had little effect. While the offensive was still going on the STAVKA reordered command arrangements in the region, creating Don Front on September 28 and subordinating six armies to it, including the 24th and 66th. On October 2 the offensive was again suspended.

Later in the month the 231st returned to 66th Army, which now contained several heavily depleted divisions. At the start of the 4th Kotluban offensive on October 20 it was in the Army's second echelon, with roughly the equivalent of a battalion of infantry remaining. As a reflection of this weakness, at the end of the second day of the offensive it was reported as situated it its previous position. At the end of the month the remaining personnel were transferred as replacements to the 116th Rifle Division and on November 2 the division was officially disbanded in Stalingrad Front. Colonel Odaryuk was soon hospitalized but after his recovery in March 1943 he moved to a staff appointment and later to the training establishment, being promoted to the rank of major general in November of that year.

== 2nd Formation ==
A new 231st was formed on July 1, 1943, in the 1st Red Banner Army of Far Eastern Front, based on the 154th Reserve Rifle Regiment. Its shtat was that of December 10, 1942 and its order of battle was very similar to that of the 1st formation:

- 607th Rifle Regiment
- 623rd Rifle Regiment
- 639th Rifle Regiment
- 1041st Artillery Regiment
- 466th Self-Propelled Artillery Battalion (in 1945)
- 423rd Antitank Battalion
- 250th Reconnaissance Company
- 339th Sapper Battalion
- 913th Signal Battalion (later 1462nd Signal Company)
- 283rd Medical/Sanitation Battalion
- 189th Chemical Defense (Anti-gas) Company
- 543rd Motor Transport Company
- 566th Field Bakery
- 856th Divisional Veterinary Hospital
- 2852nd Field Postal Station
- 1840th Field Office of the State Bank

Col. Yakov Efimovich Timoshenko was appointed to command on the day the division formed. This officer had previously led the 2nd and 252nd Rifle Brigades; he would be promoted to the rank of major general on February 22, 1944 and would lead the 2nd formation for its entire existence.

At the start of August the 231st was serving as a separate division in 1st Army but by the start of September it had been assigned the 87th Rifle Corps with the 300th Rifle Division. Later in the month the Corps came under direct command of the Front but in October it returned to 1st Army. In December the Corps was moved to the Primorsk Group of Forces, coming under direct command of the Group, which was still part of Far Eastern Front. In May 1944 the division and its Corps rejoined 1st Army, which was also part of the Primorsk Group, but in June they returned to direct Group command. These arrangements prevailed into November although the 300th was replaced by the 390th Rifle Division in 87th Corps, joining the 231st and the 113th Rifle Brigade.

During the early months of 1945 the division received the 466th Self-Propelled Artillery Battalion of 12 SU-76s (plus one T-70 command tank) to supplement its mobile firepower in anticipation of operations in the difficult terrain of Manchuria. In December the Primorsk Group had been abolished and the 300th Division had returned to 87th Corps. As preparations continued, in April 1945 the Primorsk Group was re-established and 1st Army, with 87th Corps, left Far Eastern Front and came under its command. By the beginning of August the 231st and 300th Divisions had been split up, with the former going to 59th Rifle Corps and the latter to 26th Rifle Corps, still in 1st Army.

=== Soviet Invasion of Manchuria ===
Manchurian Operation. Note initial position of 1st Army (I GE) on right.

Just prior to the start of the Manchurian Operation on August 9 the Primorsk Group was redesignated as 1st Far Eastern Front. 1st Army, commanded by Col. Gen. A. P. Beloborodov, deployed in the area of the Tigra River and Lake Khanka facing border units and elements of the 135th Infantry Division of the Japanese Kwantung Army. Beloborodov concentrated his 59th and 26th Corps in a 16km sector on the left half of the Army's zone. The mission of the shock group was to penetrate the 10-15km, heavily forested, hilly region immediately facing the Army's sector and continue the attack along two axes across relatively open country to secure Pamientung and Lishuchen on the Muling River. The Army would then continue the attack southwest toward Mudanjiang and northwest to Linkou. Eventually 1st Army would unite with 5th Army units at Mutanchiang and with 35th Army units at Mishan and Linkou.

The 1st Red Banner Army's chief obstacle was the heavily wooded terrain, now wet from heavy rains. The advancing rifle divisions would have to build roads through the forest as they advanced, requiring heavy engineer support and a carefully organized march column formation. 59th Corps was led by the 231st and 39th Rifle Divisions, each followed by a tank brigade to take the lead once the heavy terrain had been penetrated. Despite the cancellation of an artillery preparation due to heavy rain the forward detachment of the 231st led the attack at 0100 hours. By nightfall the lead battalions were up to 6km deep into Manchuria, had crossed the Shitouho River, and half of the forested belt. During the night the division's main forces closed up to the advance and the tank brigades prepared to move ahead. By the next morning the road building continued and near noon all forces had broken through to open country. At 2100 hours Pamientung was partly occupied by lead elements of 26th Corps and a bridge over the Muling had been seized.

On August 11 the campaign entered the pursuit phase with Japanese defensive positions being overrun before they could be manned. Lishuchen was also secured and on the 13th the 59th Corps captured Linkou as remnants of the 135th Infantry withdrew south toward Chihsing and Mudanjiang. The battle for the latter city raged for two days until it was cleared by 1st Army on the evening of August 16. From here the advance continued toward Harbin which was reached on August 20, linking up with air-landed forces and amphibious forces of 15th Army. On the same day most Japanese resistance ended.

== Postwar ==
On September 19 the 231st was awarded the Order of the Red Banner in recognition of its part in the crossing of the Ussuri River and the capture of Mishan, Jilin, Yanji and Harbin. Before the end of the month it had been disbanded.
