= 64th Rifle Division (1942–1945) =

- Active: 1942–1945
- Country: Soviet Union
- Branch: Red Army
- Type: Infantry
- Engagements: World War II: Battle of Stalingrad; Smolensk operation; Operation Bagration; Mogilev offensive; Vistula-Oder offensive; Battle of Berlin
- Decorations: Order of Kutuzov; Order of Suvorov
- Battle honours: Mogilev

The 64th Rifle Division was an infantry division of the Soviet Union's Red Army which existed between 1942 and 1945.

== History ==
The new 64th Rifle Division was formed in early 1942 in Serpukhov from the 7th Sapper Brigade, part of the Moscow Military District. In June 1942 the division joined the 8th Reserve Army. The division included the following elements:

- 433rd Rifle Regiment
- 440th Rifle Regiment
- 451st Rifle Regiment
- 1029th Artillery Regiment
- 180th Reconnaissance Company
- 406th Separate Destroyer Anti-Tank Battalion
- 167th Sapper Battalion
- 613th Separate Signals Battalion
- 528th Auto Transport Company
- 109th Medical Battalion
- 124th Separate Chemical Defense Company
- 372nd Field Bakery

On 16 August, the division was moved to the front and took up defensive positions in the area of the settlement of Spartak, on the northern outskirts of Pichuga with the task of preventing the enemy from moving north along the right bank of the Volga River. In sustained and bloody battles, the division suffered heavy losses, but stopped the Axis advance. The 8th Reserve Army became the 66th Army on 27 August 1942 after being sent to the Southwestern Front (the Don Front from 28 September). During September and October the division fought northwest of Stalingrad. From late November, the division participated in the encirclement and defeat of Axis troops at Stalingrad, Operation Uranus. By the end of the month, it had established itself on the bend in the railway, northeast of the village of Orlovka, where it fought until January 1943, after which it was withdrawn to the army reserve. From 20 January, the division was sent back into action during Operation Koltso, in which it ended the battle in the area of the Stalingrad Tractor Factory. In total, during the Battle of Stalingrad, the division was credited with destroying 68 tanks, four armored vehicles, 23 other vehicles, 46 guns and mortars, 125 heavy machine guns, and killing and wounding over 2,500 German soldiers and officers, as well as downing four German aircraft with rifle fire.

From 27 January to 3 February 1943, the division was transferred to the area around Sukhinichi in the Smolensk region, where it was included in the 16th Army and fought on the right bank of the Zhizdra River. From the end of April, she was part of the 50th Army and fought defensive battles in the area of the settlement of Shchigry in the Zhizdrinsky District of the Kaluga Oblast. Then the division marched to the area of the city of Serpeysk, where it became part of the 38th Rifle Corps of the 10th Army and until November fought offensive battles in the Roslavl and Mogilev directions.

At the end of April 1944, it became part of the 49th Army of the 2nd Belorussian Front and fought defensive battles near the settlements of Ustye and Lapeni in the Kastsyukovichy District of the Mogilev Oblast. At the end of June, during Operation Bagration, as part of the 38th Rifle Corps, the division crossed the Basya, Resta and Rudya rivers, and participated in the liberation of the city of Mogilev on 28 June. For this it received the Mogilev honorific. In July, it crossed the Neman River near the town of Belitsa, and in August it took part in the capture of the Osowiec Fortress, for which she was awarded the Order of Suvorov, 2nd degree on 1 September 1944. From September 1944 to January 1945, the division was in the reserve and then joined the 33rd Army of the 1st Belorussian Front and participated in the Vistula-Oder offensive. During the Berlin Offensive, the division was part of the 33rd Army of the front, and from 15 April 1945 as part of the 3rd Shock Army fought in Berlin itself during the last weeks of the war. For its actions in the latter, the division was awarded the Order of Kutuzov, 2nd class, on 11 June 1945.

The division was disbanded in mid-1945 in accordance with the order that created the Group of Soviet Forces in Germany.

== Commanders ==
- Colonel Aleksandr Ignatov (5 March 1942–1 June 1943)
- Colonel Ivan Yaremenko (13 June 1943–3 June 1944)
- Major General Timofey Shkrylyov (from 4 June 1944)
