= 116th Rifle Division =

116th Rifle Division (August 28, 1939 – December 27, 1941) 116th Rifle Division (January 22, 1942 – June 12, 1946)
- Active: 1939–1946
- Country: Soviet Union
- Branch: Red Army (1939-46)
- Type: Infantry
- Size: Division
- Engagements: Operation Barbarossa; Battle of Kiev (1941); Battles of Rzhev; Battle of Stalingrad; Operation Uranus; Operation Ring; Belgorod–Kharkov offensive operation Battle of the Dnieper; Battle of Korsun–Cherkassy; Dnieper-Carpathian offensive Uman–Botoșani offensive First Jassy–Kishinev offensive Second Jassy–Kishinev offensive Vistula–Oder offensive Lower Silesian offensive Battle of Berlin; Battle of Bautzen (1945); Prague offensive
- Decorations: Order of the Red Banner; Order of Kutuzov (both 2nd Formation)
- Battle honours: Kharkov (2nd Formation)

Commanders
- Notable commanders: Col. Tikhon Davydovich Klishev; Maj. Gen. Yakov Filippovich Yeryomenko; Col. Vasilii Akimovich Samsonov; Maj. Gen. Ivan Matveevich Makarov; Maj. Gen. Vasilii Andreevich Smirnov

The 116th Rifle Division was formed as an infantry division of the Red Army in August 1939, in the Volga Military District, based on the shtat (table of organization and equipment) of the following month. At the start of the German invasion it was in the Odessa Military District as part of the 7th Rifle Corps. Within days it was detached to Southern Front, but quickly returned to Southwestern Front. During July it was redeployed by rail to the Cherkasy region to join 26th Army for the defense of the Dniepr southeast of Kyiv. In August it came under command of 38th Army before moving back to the 26th in September, just before Army Groups South and Center began their encirclement operation that trapped most of Southwestern Front in eastern Ukraine. Still holding along the Dniepr the 116th had no real chance to escape, and was officially written off on December 27.

A new 116th was formed very soon after, based on a 400-series division, in the Transbaikal Military District, and after only about six weeks of equipping and training began moving west by rail for assignment on the south flank of Western Front. It was assigned to 50th Army and suffered heavy losses in the effort to relieve the encircled 33rd Army, then spent several months on the defensive. In August it entered the Reserve of the Supreme High Command and moved south, soon being assigned to the 1st Guards Army of Stalingrad Front north of the Kotluban corridor, the supply line of German 6th Army in Stalingrad. The division lost heavily for little gain during a series of attacks in early September, after which it was reassigned to 66th Army in the new Don Front. During and after the encirclement of the Axis forces in and near the city the 116th conducted attacks against the strong German positions north of Orlovka until the final days of Operation Ring when it advanced into the factory district. Following this victory it was redeployed with its Army to the northwest, eventually to the Steppe Military District east of Kursk where it was reassigned to 53rd Army. It early August it took part in the counteroffensive against the defeated Army Group South forces south of the Kursk salient and was soon rewarded with an honorific. After advancing through eastern Ukraine it helped force a crossing of the Dniepr near Kremenchuk, now as part of 2nd Ukrainian Front. Through the winter the division took part in a series of battles in the Dniepr bend until breaking through to the Dniestr in the spring of 1944. It saw only limited action in the fighting in Moldova in April and May, now as part of 52nd Army, but in the August offensive that destroyed German 6th Army for the second time it played a leading role in the encirclement near Chișinău. It was awarded the Order of the Red Banner, and its regiments also received decorations. As this campaign wrapped up the 116th, along with the rest of its Army, entered the Reserve of the Supreme High Command and moved north to join 1st Ukrainian Front. During the Lower Silesian Offensive it took part in the capture of Bunzlau and was awarded the Order of Kutuzov. In the initial days of the Berlin operation the division covered a long stretch of the Neisse River but soon joined the offensive in the direction of Dresden, fighting against a determined German push to the north. It ended the war advancing with its Front toward Prague. Following the German surrender the 116th was pulled back into Poland with its Army, assigned briefly to the Northern Group of Forces, before moving to western Ukraine in early 1946, where it was disbanded in June.

== 1st Formation ==
The 116th was formed at Penza in the Volga Military District in accordance to a decree issued on August 28, 1939. The division was based on a cadre from the 75th Rifle Regiment of the elite 25th Rifle Division. Col. Tikhon Davydovich Klishev was appointed to command on the same day. Formation was largely complete by September 12 and the personnel and equipment were loaded on trains for redeployment to Kharkov Military District where it was subordinated to 55th Rifle Corps. As of September 24 it had 14,389 personnel on strength. On August 20, 1940, Col. Yakov Filippovich Yeryomenko took over command. This officer had most recently served as deputy commander of the 23rd Rifle Division and acting commander of the 162nd Rifle Division.

In the spring of 1941 the division was deployed to the Odessa Military District in the vicinity of Mykolaiv. It joined the 7th Rifle Corps, which also contained the 196th and 206th Rifle Divisions. Its order of battle was as follows:

- 441st Rifle Regiment
- 548th Rifle Regiment
- 656th Rifle Regiment
- 406th Artillery Regiment
- 255th Howitzer Artillery Regiment
- 246th Antitank Battalion
- 305th Antiaircraft Battalion
- 178th Reconnaissance Battalion
- 250th Sapper Battalion
- 231st Signal Battalion
- 193rd Medical/Sanitation Battalion
- 136th Chemical Defense (Anti-gas) Platoon
- 75th Motor Transport Company
- 222nd Motorized Field Bakery
- 26th Divisional Veterinary Hospital
- 453rd Field Postal Station
- 234th Field Office of the State Bank

After a little over a week of frantic mobilization, at the end of June the entire Corps was moved north and assigned to the reserves of Southwestern Front. Partway through this move the 116th, given its initial deployment, was detached from the Corps and reassigned to the newly formed Southern Front, joining the Front reserves as a separate division. By July 10 it was back in the reserves of Southwestern Front, where it and the 227th Rifle Division were joined to create the Glavkoma Southwestern Direction.

== Battle of Kyiv ==
By this time forces of the 1st Panzer Group were nearing the western outskirts of Kyiv and the danger to the Ukrainian capital was acute. The 116th began loading on trains on July 10 for transfer to the Cherkasy area, arriving at Sidirovka by July 19. By the end of the month it was north of Shpola, facing the 60th Motorized Division. By now it was under command of 26th Army, still in Southwestern Front. On August 3 it was reassigned to the new 38th Army and by August 11 the division had been pushed back to a sector from east of Korsun-Shevchenkivskyi to north of Smila.

The 116th fell back again, to Cherkasy, which it was contesting along with Krolevets Island in the Dniepr in cooperation with elements of the 212nd Motorized Division. After crossing to the east bank it remained facing the XXXXIV Army Corps across the river by early September. On September 7 it was moved back to 26th Army. On the same day, General Yeryomenko was badly concussed by shellfire and hospitalized; he would not return to service until April 1942 when he became chief of staff of the Stalingrad Military Academy. Several months later he was given command of the 169th Rifle Division, and later led three other divisions, but his health never completely recovered and he died of illness on February 13, 1945. Lt. Colonel Viktor Fyodorovich Buyanov, who had been serving as chief of staff of the 175th Rifle Division, took over the 116th and would remain in nominal command until the division was disbanded.

1st Panzer Group broke out of its bridgehead at Kremenchuk on September 12 and began driving north to link up with 2nd Panzer Group deep in the rear of Southwestern Front. The two linked up on September 15 and the 116th was caught in the trap, attempting to retreat northeastward to Orzhytsia. Buyanov escaped the encirclement near Zmiiv alone, without weapons, and in civilian clothes, but was cleared of any wrongdoing by the NKVD and went on to serve in many staff positions until his retirement in April 1951. A number of other individuals and small groups also managed to filter through the German lines, but by the beginning of October the 116th had disappeared from the Red Army order of battle, although in common with many other divisions encircled near Kyiv it wasn't officially written off until December 27.

== 2nd Formation ==
A new rifle division preliminarily numbered as the 457th began forming on December 8, 1941, at Antipikha (a suburb of Chita) in the Transbaikal Military District, based a decree of November 22. On January 22, 1942, it was redesignated as the new formation of the 116th. Col. Vasilii Akimovich Samsonov, who had been given command of the 457th, remained in command. Once redesignated its order of battle remained very much the same as the 1st formation:

- 441st Rifle Regiment
- 548th Rifle Regiment
- 656th Rifle Regiment
- 406th Artillery Regiment
- 246th Antitank Battalion
- 120th Antiaircraft Battery (until February 5, 1942)
- 140th Mortar Battalion (until October 16, 1942)
- 178th Reconnaissance Company
- 250th Sapper Battalion
- 231st Signal Battalion (later 231st Signal Company)
- 193rd Medical/Sanitation Battalion
- 540th Chemical Defense (Anti-gas) Platoon
- 75th Motor Transport Company
- 456th Field Bakery
- 921st Divisional Veterinary Hospital
- 1665th Field Postal Station
- 1098th Field Office of the State Bank

The division began moving west on the Trans-Siberian Railway on February 7. According to STAVKA Directive No. 01542 to Army Gen. G. K. Zhukov, commander of the Western Direction, on February 16:

7. For the conducting of the operation to destroy the enemy's Bolkhov–Zhizdra–Bryansk grouping, subordinate the 5th Guards Rifle Corps and the 97th, 116th and 149th Rifle Divisions upon their arrival at their detraining points to the Commander-in-Chief of the Western Direction no later than 25 February.

=== Battles of Rzhev ===
On March 3 the division joined the active army when it was assigned to Lt. Gen. I. V. Boldin's 50th Army in Western Front. Two days later, units of the Front liberated Yukhnov, but at the same time 33rd Army was fighting in encirclement southwest of Vyazma, and its situation was becoming increasingly desperate. On March 20 the STAVKA ordered the 50th, 43rd and 49th Armies to link up with 33rd Army and the attached Group Belov. This effort had no success. The 116th and several other divisions of the 50th engaged in fighting well into April for a series of hills called Zaitseva Gora, which commanded the Warsaw highway. For a short time on April 14 only 2km separated 50th and 33rd Armies, but a German counterattack the next day threw 50th Army back. By April 20 the Rzhev-Vyazma offensive ended when the STAVKA ordered Western Front over to the defense.

== Battle of Stalingrad ==
On May 27 Colonel Samsonov left the division; he would later lead the 58th Rifle Division for the remainder of the war, being promoted to major general on September 13, 1944. He was replaced by Col. Ivan Matveevich Makarov, an artillery officer who would be promoted to major general on January 27, 1943.

On August 18 the division entered the Reserve of the Supreme High Command for redeployment to the south. German Army Group B was advancing toward Stalingrad and the STAVKA was massing forces to the north of the Don River to intervene. The 116th was assigned to the new 1st Guards Army in Stalingrad Front on August 28. While this Army had been fighting in the area of Kletskaya it now shifted east to assist in a new round of offensives attempting to sever the corridor that linked German 6th Army in Stalingrad with its bridgeheads over the Don north of Kalach-na-Donu.

=== Kotluban Offensives ===
On August 26 Stalin appointed Zhukov as deputy Supreme Commander and sent him south to take control of Stalingrad's defenses. Stalin then created the 24th and 66th Armies specifically to attack 6th Army's northern flank, the Kotluban corridor. The commander of 1st Guards, Maj. Gen. K. S. Moskalenko, was ordered to join this effort, inserting his Army between the other two, facing the XIV Panzer Corps at and east of Kuzmichi. The attack was originally set for September 2 but Zhukov delayed it until 0500 hours on September 3 to allow Moskalenko to complete his deployment. 24th and 66th Armies would join the attack on September 5 or 6. The assault began with a 30-minute artillery preparation of very limited effectiveness. The objective was to penetrate the defense from Hill 139.7 west to Kuzmichi and link up with 62nd Army some 10km to the south.

The attack proved both fruitless and costly, despite the support of more than 150 tanks of the 7th Tank Corps. The terrain was without cover and completely flat, apart from numerous gullies and balkas which provided firing positions for the defenders of the 8th Grenadier Regiment of 3rd Motorized Division in Konnaia Balka and on the slopes of Hill 139.7. In addition, the sector had been reinforced with 88mm antiaircraft/antitank guns. These, along with air strikes, destroyed or knocked out many of the tanks. 7th Tanks had two brigades in first echelon and one, plus its 7th Motorized Rifle Brigade in second. The lead brigades lost contact with the 116th due to heavy fire and suffered accordingly, despite the second echelon being committed. Despite the difficulties the attack gained up to 4km and the 116th reached the north and northeast slopes of the hill before losses became too great to continue. The General Staff's operational report at day's end stated "116th RD was fighting along the line Konnaia Balka–northern slope of Hill 139.7." While the gains were minimal, the attack served to divert air and artillery support from the battle in the Stalingrad suburbs and forced the 3rd and 60th Motorized Division to move units from the city. Over the next three days the 8th Regiment was replaced by the fresher 92nd Grenadier Regiment of the 60th.

Moskalenko, under Zhukov's supervision in his headquarters, renewed his assault at 0830 hours the next day. He changed his plan slightly by reinforcing the 116th and 24th Rifle Divisions, plus 7th Tanks, with the 84th Rifle Division. Beginning at about 0630 a 90-minute German counter-preparation began, which overwhelmed the Army's artillery and caused heavy casualties among Makarov's riflemen. The General Staff reported:

1st Guards Army, overcoming strong enemy fire and resistance, continued to engage in stubborn offensive fighting all day on 4 September and, after approaching close to the southern grouping of our forces defending the Hill 145.1-Hill 143.6 line, reached the Hill 145.1-Hill 139.7... line by day's end...
116th RD and 16th TC, encountering stubborn enemy resistance and continuous air attacks, were fighting along the Hill 145.1-southern spurs of Konnaia Balka line at 1700 hours...

In an evening conversation between Maj. Gen. G. F. Zakharov, chief of staff of Southeastern Front, and Col. I. I. Boyko of the General Staff, the latter stated that "up to hundreds of aircraft constantly attacked the combat formations of 24th, 116th, and 84th Rifle Divisions and prevented the infantry from going on the attack." The major change for September 5 was that the 24th and 66th Armies were finally available to support 1st Guards on the flanks, at least by the evening. According to the revised plan:

1st Guards Army, cooperating with 24th Army, will attack toward Basargino Station [25km west of Stalingrad] and subsequently reach the Novyi Put'–Verkhne-Tsaritsynskii line...

The overall plan called for four armies to penetrate the corridor then encircle and destroy the bulk of the German forces west of the city. In retrospect, Moskalenko considered this completely unrealistic given the losses of the previous three days, including up to 150 tanks and thousands of infantry. At Zhukov's insistence the attack went in, again with minimal artillery support, and immediately broke down against "clearly increasing resistance." In the evening summary the 116th was reported as fighting for the north slope of Hill 143.6 as of 1500 hours. The offensive had by now stalled without hope of recovery; Zhukov finally agreed on September 11 although limited action continued for two more days. This respite would be short as the Armies would be expected to attack again on September 16. Before this took place the Army boundaries were shuffled and the 116th came under command of 66th Army.

==== Second Kotluban Offensive ====
In the event the new offensive began on September 18. 66th Army formed a shock group made up of the 41st and 38th Guards Rifle Divisions and the 116th deployed on an 8km-wide sector on the Army's right flank west of the Sukhaya Mechetka River and north of Hill 139.7. The group numbered about 18,000 personnel with a few infantry support tanks facing the 8th and 92nd Grenadier Regiments. These had roughly 5,000 men backed by 30-40 tanks. By now the German forces were deployed in a network of strongpoints reinforced with numerous obstacles. 16th Air Army's 123 supporting aircraft, mostly fighters, were significantly outnumbered by German air assets. The attack was launched at 0700 hours following another ineffective artillery preparation of some 90 minutes and the results were predictable. The day's report for 66th Army simply stated that "after encountering strong enemy resistance, [it] was unable to advance." The one-sided action continued the next day and after 48 hours the Army had suffered 20,405 casualties. Stalin now intervened, ordering Zhukov to alter the plan so, among other things, 66th Army could undertake "active operations toward Stalingrad." The offensive was resumed on September 23, now with the 116th under 24th Army's command, but the Army's attacks utterly failed. Through September 20-26 24th Army lost a total of 6,305 killed, wounded and missing. On September 28 Don Front was created with six armies, including the 24th and 66th.

==== Fourth Kotluban Offensive ====
In the second week of October 6th Army captured the Dzerzhinskii Tractor Factory in northern Stalingrad, leading to a crisis for 62nd Army's defense. Stalin sent orders via Zhukov to the commander of Don Front, Lt. Gen. K. K. Rokossovskii, on October 15, to accelerate his preparations for a major strike toward the city. By now the 116th was back in 66th Army, which was now under command of Maj. Gen. A. S. Zhadov. He formed a shock group of four relatively fresh rifle divisions, backed by three full-strength tank brigades. His nine remaining divisions, including the 116th, were assigned to supporting attacks on the Army's left and right flanks. The 116th and 299th Rifle Divisions, on the shock group's left flank, with the support of eight tanks of the 58th Tank Brigade, were to attack the defenses west of Yerzovka. Given the results of the previous two months Rokossovskii later stated that he expected the assault to achieve very little:

We were given permission to use seven infantry divisions from the GHQ Reserve for the operation but received no additional supporting means in the shape of artillery, armor, or aircraft. The chances of success were remote, especially as the enemy had well fortified positions.... Happily only two [actually four] of the promised seven new divisions arrived by the deadline... As expected, the attack failed. The armies of the Don Front were unable to penetrate the enemy's defenses...

The General Staff report of October 21 could say no more than "The positions of 116th and 299th RDs' units are being confirmed." The next day the 116th, with 58th Tanks, "conducted offensive fighting" with the results to be confirmed. By October 26 Zhadov's remaining men had gone over to the defense. At the end of the month the remaining personnel of the 231st Rifle Division, amounting to roughly a battalion, were transferred as replacements to the 116th and on November 2 the 231st was officially disbanded.

=== Operation Uranus ===
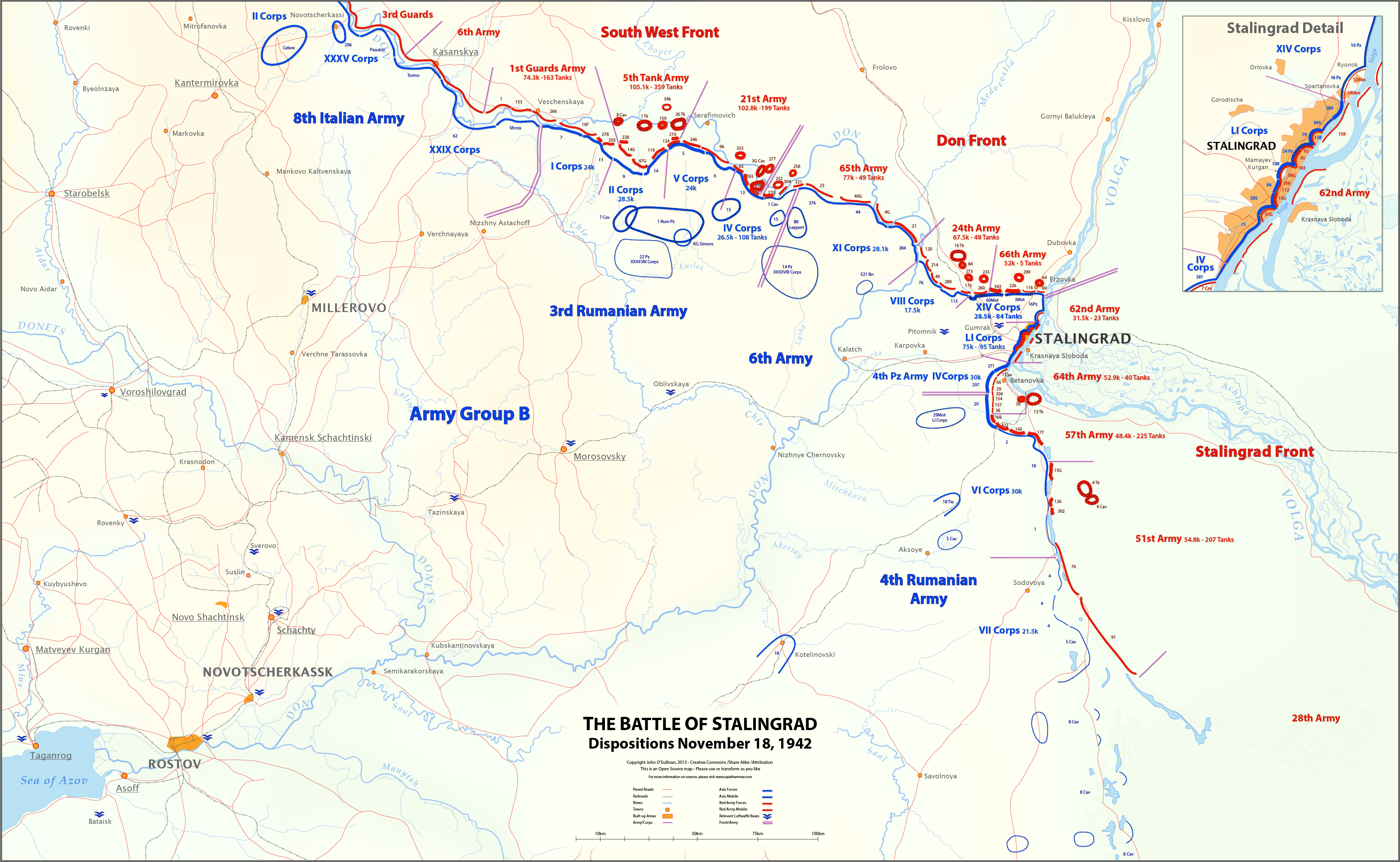
Preliminaries to Operation Uranus. Note position of the 116th north of Stalingrad.

As Operation Uranus began on November 19 the division remained in its former positions, now in the first echelon of 66th Army. The Army did not have an active role in the offensive, but was expected to tie down enemy forces through local attacks and raids to prevent them shifting westward to where the penetration was to take place.

On November 23 the encirclement of 6th Army was completed, and Rokossovskii gave orders to Zhadov that evening to attack from Yerzovka toward Orlovka at dawn in yet another effort to link up with 62nd Army in the city. At the same time, Gen. W. von Seydlitz-Kurzbach of LI Army Corps ordered his troops occupying the sector north of Orlovka and Rynok to destroy all immobile equipment and pull back to new defenses nearer Orlovka overnight. This placed his 94th Infantry Division in a dangerous position that 66th Army was able to exploit. The General Staff report of November 25 stated:

66th Army went over to an offensive toward the Orlovka region early on the morning of 24 November and, overcoming stubborn enemy resistance, advanced 2-8 kilometres in the center and on the left wing.

The 94th, which was already in a weakened state, lost several officers and roughly 200 men in the chaos, plus 250 more over the next two days. Zhadov had attacked with six divisions, including the 116th, with one tank brigade. He resumed the assault on the morning of November 25 but the situation had stabilized somewhat and the attack made few gains. The 116th reached the east slope of Hill 145.1, 3.5km northwest of Orlovka, before being halted by a counterattack from 16th Panzer Division's 79th Panzergrenadier Regiment.

Over the following four weeks 66th Army was largely involved in positional warfare. The General Staff report of November 28 stated that it "resumed its offensive across it entire front at 1200 hours," but "strong enemy resistance" led to "insignificant advances in several sectors." The main attack on this date was made by the 116th and 99th Rifle Divisions in first echelon and the 299th in second. 58th Tanks again supported the 116th, and later it and the 299th together. Makarov's men were to take Hills 144.2, 147.6, and 145.1, all of which lay north and northwest of Orlovka, being reinforced by the 299th for the final assault on the strongpoint. The defense was manned by a variety of units from 16th Panzer, 94th Infantry, and 24th Panzer Division. 6th Army reported that roughly two battalions of the 116th and more than six tanks had "pushed forward to the gully 2.5 kms northwest of Orlovka [and have] not yet been sealed off." A further report from LI Corps stated that the two battalions and seven tanks had taken Hill 145.1 and pushed over the railroad to the south. A later counterattack by 16th Panzer retook the hill, but fighting was said to be ongoing. Zhadov committed the 299th on November 30 and the combined force took Hills 147.6 and 135.4, but soon lost the latter to a counterattack. By now it was clear to the STAVKA that the job of wearing down and eliminating 6th Army would be larger than anticipated.

A further attack by the 116th and 299th, with 58th Tanks backed by the KV tanks of 7th Guards Heavy Tank Regiment, took place on December 4, but this was intended as a diversion. As a result of this and further efforts over the following days 6th Army ordered the pioneer battalion of 384th Infantry Division to reinforce 16th Panzer. A lull in Don Front's operations followed during December 11-15. By this time the 16th and 24th Panzer Divisions had a combined tank strength of just 17 operational vehicles. Between December 24-31 the Front was largely limited to improving positions, conducting reconnaissance, and exchanging fire with the rapidly weakening German forces. Nevertheless, the 116th, 226th and 343rd Rifle Divisions of 66th Army continued to attack the hilltop positions of 16th and 24th Panzer through December 26-31 which caused 682 German casualties in total.

=== Operation Ring ===
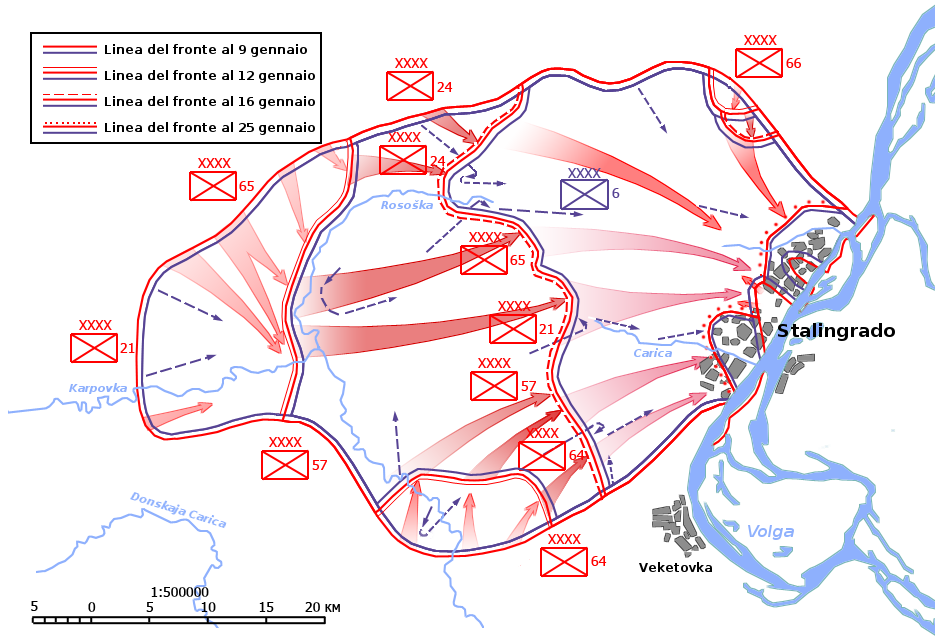
Operation Ring. Note position of 66th Army.

The initial plan for the final elimination of 6th Army was laid down on December 27. The main attack would be made by three armies driving west to east to split the pocket along its long axis. Zhadov would commit five of his six divisions on a supporting attack west of Orlovka. Initially, Operation Koltso was to begin on January 6 and last seven days, but Soviet intelligence continued to believe some 50,000 men were trapped in the pocket, while the true number, four times greater, only became clear after the operation was completed. In the event, due to the need to bring up ammunition and other supplies, Koltso was postponed to January 10.

In the meantime Don Front continued patrols, reconnaissance, and limited attacks to disguise the intended assault sectors. The 116th was now on the extreme left flank of the Front from where, on January 4, it attacked the defenses on Hill 147.6, 3km northwest of Orlovka, with some 200 riflemen, supported by powerful artillery fire. This gained no ground, but a further assault on January 6, with the 226th joining in, penetrated on a 400m-wide sector and this was held against counterattacks. The fighting over three days cost 16th Panzer another 179 casualties. Two German battalions and an artillery group were reported by XI Army Corps as being "exhausted." The OKH was expecting the main offensive to begin on January 9, based on previous Red Army practice, but the day passed quietly.

When the main event began 66th Army's assignment was to "operate actively" to pin down German forces to prevent the reinforcing of the main axis. On January 8 General Rokossovskii had issued an ultimatum to the trapped Axis forces, demanding their surrender, but this was rejected. Zhadov decided to conduct his main attacks in the 7km-wide sector from Hill 147.6 northwest to Hill 139.7. He formed a shock group consisting of the 99th, 116th and 226th Divisions, plus the 124th Rifle Brigade, in first echelon, backed up by the 7th Guards Heavy Tanks on the left wing and the 64th Division in second echelon. Still facing the two panzer divisions of XI Corps the ultimate objective was the village of Gorodishche in Stalingrad's western suburbs.

The artillery preparation began at 0805 hours on January 10 and lasted 55 minutes, but the ground assault still faced stubborn initial resistance. Late on January 11 16th Panzer reported two 700m-wide breaches in its lines that could not be closed; the next day it had just nine tanks still serviceable. During that day the Army's shock group, which no longer contained the 116th, worked to widen the breaches and although 16th Panzer continued to hold out its losses would force it to withdraw to stronger defenses on January 13.

When the final stage of Operation Ring began on January 25 the Army converged on XI Corps' defenses from the eastern edge of Gorodishche, east through Orlovka to the high ground west of Spartanovka. These attacks forced the German Corps to abandon the system of strongpoints around Orlovka and fall back towards the factory district of Stalingrad without any heavy weapons. The 116th, 64th, 99th, and 299th jointly liberated Orlovka, and advanced as far as the west bank of the Mechetka River. On February 1, 66th Army attacked at 1000 hours into the last enemy-held positions in the Tractor Factory village. By this time the first echelon divisions each had no more than 1,000 front-line infantry remaining, but were reinforced by the second echelon, including the 116th The following day the remaining Germans in the northern pocket laid down their arms.

When the fighting at Stalingrad concluded, the division was first assigned to the Stalingrad Group of Forces on February 6. On March 13 it went into the Reserve of the Supreme High Command with the rest of 66th Army.

== Operation Polkhovodets Rumyantsev ==
In the wake of the victory at Stalingrad Don Front was redeployed, largely as the new formation of Central Front. 66th Army, however, along with the 116th, was originally intended to be moved all the way to Toropets to join Kalinin Front, according to a STAVKA order of February 28. Twenty-four hours later, as Army Group South's counterattack south of Kharkiv developed, this plan was abandoned, and the Army was redirected to Starobilsk to join the reserve of Southwestern Front by March 24. This new order also directed the NKO to fill out the Army's divisions with "missing personnel, horses, weapons, and equipment" to bring the strength of each division up to 8,000 men. On May 5 the 66th was redesignated as 5th Guards Army in the Steppe Military District, but later in the month the 116th was reassigned to 53rd Army in the same District. For its services in the preceding campaigns the 406th Artillery Regiment was awarded the Order of the Red Banner on June 20.

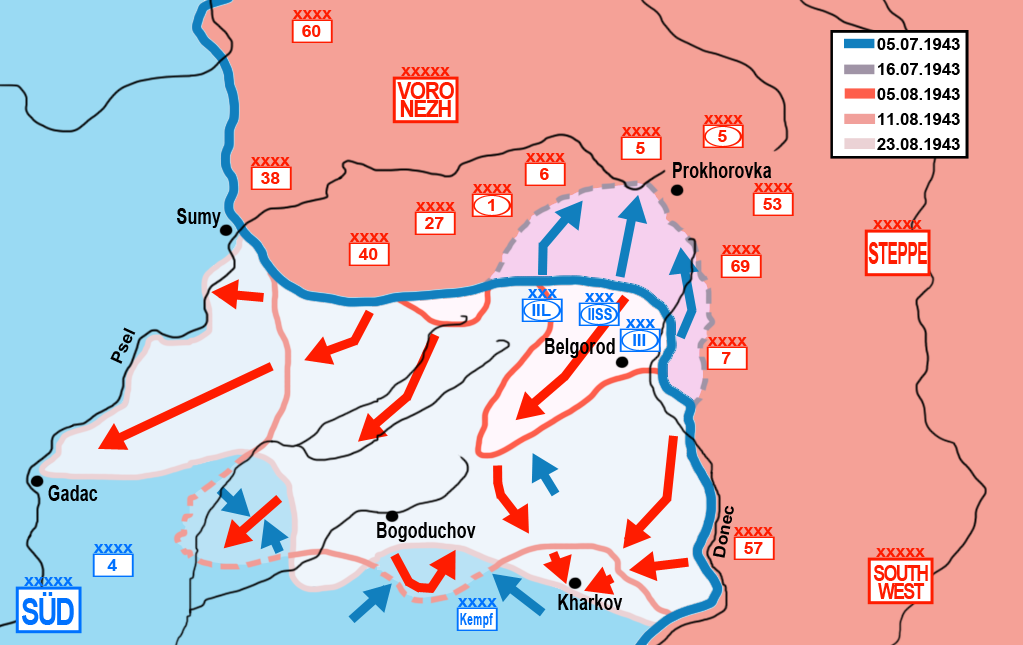
Operation Polkovodets Rumyantsev

Once the STAVKA took the decision to await a German offensive against the Kursk salient the armies of Steppe Military District (as of July 9 Steppe Front) became both a longstop defense force and a reserve for the eventual counteroffensive. By mid-May the 53rd Army was digging in along the Kshen River on a sector from Nikolskoe to Prilepy.

The German offensive in the south began on July 5 and was effectively halted by July 12. For the counteroffensive, Operation Polkovodets Rumyantsev, the Front commander, Col. Gen. I. S. Konev, formed a shock group consisting of 53rd Army and the 48th Rifle Corps of 69th Army. These were deployed on an 11km-wide front from Glushinskii to Visloe for an attack to begin on August 3. 53rd Army had three reinforced divisions in first echelon, including the 116th, with four divisions and 1st Mechanized Corps in second. Its attack would be supported by up to 230 guns and mortars per kilometre.

The counteroffensive started as planned, preceded by a complex artillery preparation from 0500 to 0815 hours. The shock group faced stubborn trench fighting until 1500 when 1st Mechanized was committed and completed the breakthrough of the main German defensive zone. In all the 53rd Army advanced 7–9km by day's end. On August 4 the Army broke through the second and third defensive zones which covered Belgorod from the north. For the next day it was ordered "to speed up the offensive in the general direction of Mikoyanovka." In accordance it pushed the defenders out of the Streletskoye and Bolkhovets strongpoints, breaking through the fourth defensive line and reached a line from Vodyanoe to Krasnoe; the 89th Guards and 305th Rifle Divisions of 69th Army cleared Belgorod by 1800 hours.

As the offensive developed elements of Steppe Front recaptured Kharkiv for the last time, and the division was awarded a battle honor:

KHARKOV – ...116th Rifle Division (Major General Makarov, Ivan Matveevich)... The troops that participated in the liberation of Kharkov, by order of the Supreme Commander-in-Chief of 23 August 1943 and a commendation in Moscow, are given a salute of 20 artillery salvoes by 224 guns.

== Battle of the Dniepr ==
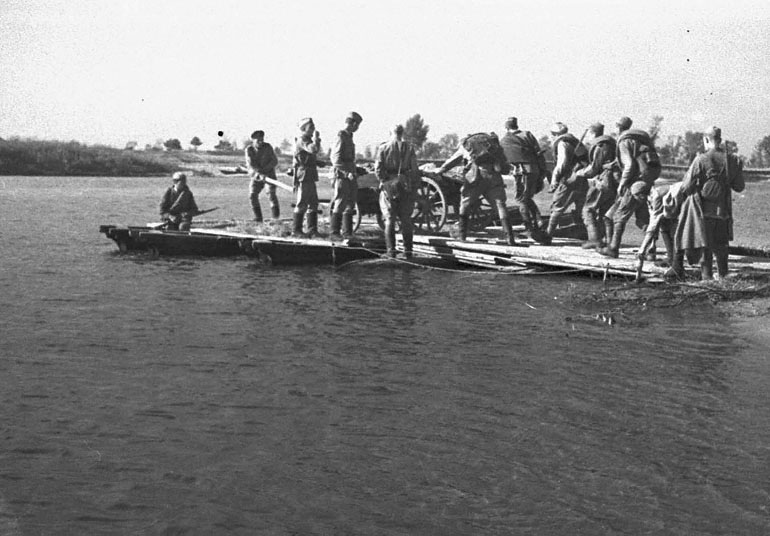
Soviet soldiers crossing the Dniepr on improvised rafts

As of September 1 the 48th Corps had been incorporated into 53rd Army and consisted of the 116th and 107th Rifle Divisions. The Red Army now embarked on an offensive to clear the remainder of eastern Ukraine. Steppe Front advanced toward Poltava and, after that city was taken, continued on toward Kremenchuk. This was one of the five crossing points over the Dniepr available to Army Group South as it withdrew to the so-called Wotan line. On September 26 the Front made three improvised crossings between Kremenchuk and Dnipro which, over the next few days were expanded to a single bridgehead 50km wide and up to 16km deep. By the end of September 28 the 53rd Army's right flank divisions were attempting to force the Psel River while reaching the east bank of the Dniepr from that confluence to the village of Drobetskovka. At about this time the 116th joined the 84th and 375th Rifle Division to form 74th Rifle Corps.

The Army captured Kremenchuk on September 29 while its left flank units took Kryachuk Island in mid-stream. Overnight on September 30/October 1 the west bank was reached with elements of two divisions, taking a small bridgehead southeast of Chukalivka before beginning a day-long fight for that place. By October 3 the bridgehead was still very constricted as crossings continued.

In the first weeks of October General Konev shifted his 5th Guards Army to 53rd Army's bridgehead. The Kremenchug-Pyatikhatki Offensive began on October 15 when a dozen rifle divisions attacked out of the bridgehead and by the next day Konev had three armies across the river, tearing open the left flank of 1st Panzer Army. On October 18 Piatykhatky was liberated, cutting the main railroads to Dnipro and Kryvyi Rih, which was the obvious next objective. The lead elements of Steppe Front (as of October 20 2nd Ukrainian Front) reached the outskirts of Kryvyi Rih but were counterattacked on the 27th by the XXXX Panzer Corps, driving them back some 32km and doing considerable damage to the Red Army formations in the process. By the beginning of November the 116th was under direct Army command, where it remained into December. On December 5 General Makarov was severely wounded and hospitalized. He would not hold another command and retired in 1952. He was replaced on December 10 by Maj. Gen. Vasilii Andreevich Smirnov. This officer had most recently led the 129th Rifle Division before being wounded and hospitalized in late 1942. He came to the 116th from the deputy chief of staff position at 53rd Army headquarters, and would lead the division until it was disbanded. By the beginning of the new year it was in 75th Rifle Corps.

On January 3 Konev launched an offensive toward Kirovograd with 53rd Army, backed by 5th Guards Mechanized Corps, advancing toward Mala Vyska. The city was reached within 48 hours and the XXXXVII Panzer Corps was encircled, being forced to break out to the west on January 8. During the month the 116th returned to 5th Guards Army as part of 32nd Guards Rifle Corps, but during February it transferred again, now to 52nd Army. The division would remain in 52nd Army for the duration of the war. Throughout this period the Army was under command of Lt. Gen. (later Col. Gen.) K. A. Koroteev.

== Jassy-Kishinev Offensives ==
Uman–Botoșani Offensive. Note advance of 52nd Army.

During the Uman–Botoșani offensive in March and April 52nd Army advanced past Uman, crossed the Dniestr, and ended its drive south of Bălți due to logistics and the spring thaw. As of April 1 the Army consisted of seven rifle divisions and a tank regiment. 73rd and 78th Rifle Corps each had three divisions, while Koroteev held the 116th as his Army reserve. 78th Corps formed the left wing in the Pyrlitsa region while 73rd Corps moved westward to attack German positions north of Iași. The depleted 6th Tank Army was supplying what support it could to Koroteev's forces.

While other elements of the Front were engaged in the First Battle of Târgu Frumos, on April 13 Konev ordered Koroteev to probe the positions of German IV Army Corps (Group Mieth) north of Iași as cover for a major regrouping. 73rd Corps attacked 24th Panzer Division with two divisions, backed by a handful of vehicles from 6th Tanks, joined by the 116th when it was assigned from reserve. IV Corps succeeded in holding its line after being reinforced by a battlegroup from 23rd Panzer Division.

=== Operation Sonja ===
By late May Konev had devised a new plan for the capture of Iași, which involved the transfer of 27th Guards Rifle Corps, from 7th Guards Army, to the west, into positions behind 73rd Corps. All of this was preempted on May 30, when German 8th Army launched a limited offensive north of the city. Operation Sonja began with a strong aviation and artillery preparation against the rifle divisions of 52nd Army, followed by attacks from tanks and infantry. The Corps now consisted of the 116th, 50th, and 373rd Rifle Divisions, deployed on a 12km-wide sector from Rediu Aldei to Horlești, backed by the Army reserve 254th Rifle Division. Battlegroups of the 23rd and 24th Panzer moved northwards on both sides of the Enache Forest and after running a gauntlet of Soviet artillery fire penetrated the defenses at the junction between the 373rd and 294th Rifle Divisions and lunged forward towards the village of Stanca, some 8km beyond. The 116th was on the west flank of this penetration. Despite strong resistance, by 2000 hours the German forces had taken Stanca and the 373rd was driven back to the outskirts of Cârpiți. At about this time the 254th was ordered up to reinforce the badly shaken 373rd. By the following day 73rd Corps had regained its balance and the enemy made no further gains. As well, elements of 6th Tanks were ordered forward to support 52nd Army and repel the offensive; 5th Mechanized Corps backed the 73rd Corps and restored the situation.

=== Second Jassy-Kishinev Offensive ===
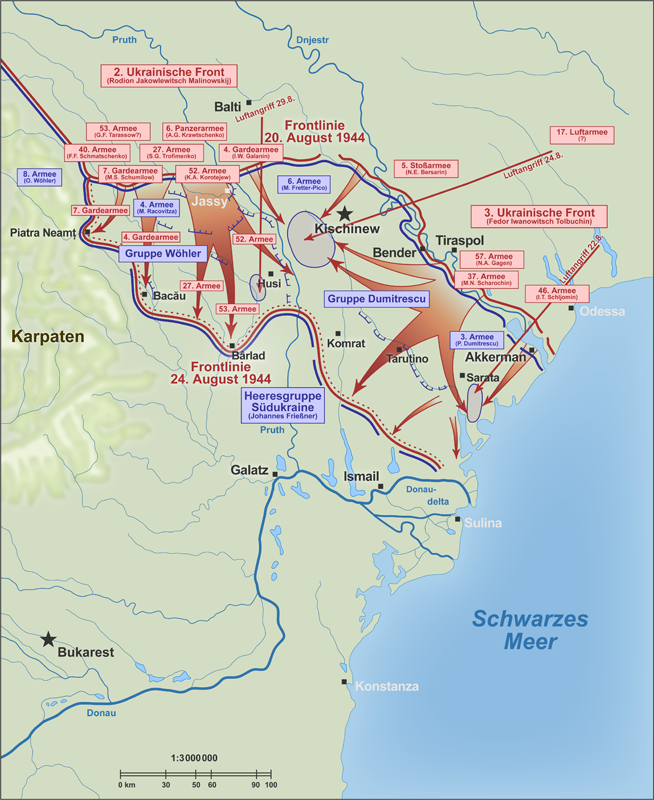
Second Jassy-Kishinev. Note route of 52nd Army.

In the buildup to the new summer offensive the 116th was again withdrawn to the Army reserve. The offensive began in the early morning of August 20 with an artillery preparation of one hour and 40 minutes duration which wreaked significant destruction on the German and Romanian defenses and forces, although some strongpoints remained relatively intact. 52nd Army, now with nine divisions under command, broke through the Axis defense along a 12km front and advanced 16km during the day, forcing the Bahlui River in the process, and by the end of the day was engaged in fighting in the area of the Iași railway station. By 2200 hours elements of 73rd Corps were entering the suburbs of the city.

The task of clearing the city was assigned to the Corps for August 21. During most of the day the 116th was engaged in stubborn fighting for the village of Galata, where enemy reserves were concentrated to hold open an escape route to the south. While the 294th Rifle Division with the third battalion of the 223rd Tank Brigade cleared Iași by 1230 hours, the 373rd had to be committed to the fighting for Galata, which was seized by the end of the day. This day's battles used up the slender Axis reserves across the front, as well as any hope of countering new Red Army advances. On the next day the 52nd Army crushed the enemy resistance along the south bank of the Bahlui as a preliminary for an advance on Huși. 73rd Corps was tied up in heavy fighting for an enemy strongpoint referred to as the "Little Fortress" height about 2km south of Iași which dominated the surrounding terrain. When this was overcome at day's end the Corps continued to move through the night on the paved road to Vaslui. On September 15 the 116th would be awarded the Order of the Red Banner for its part in the battle for Iași.

The ultimate objective for Koroteev on August 23 was to link up with forces of 3rd Ukrainian Front and complete the encirclement of the Axis' Chișinău group of forces. By this time those forces were in full retreat. During the day 52nd Army finished off enemy units that had been scattered by the advance of 18th Tank Corps and by the end of the day 73rd Corps had reached a line from Șerbotești to Șerbești, but the pocket remained open. The next day the 52nd and the 18th Tank Corps were ordered to seize and hold Huși. During this day Romanian units began dropping out of the fighting. Through the day the 73rd Corps, with tank support, fought for the city against a disorganized but desperate defense. By 1900 hours Huși was taken, and the Corps continued its advance to the south and east to complete the encirclement.

The trapped Chișinău group occupied a pocket of about 60km by 50km in area, and would have to seize crossings over the Prut River to escape. While the other forces of 2nd Ukrainian Front began to exploit to the west, 52nd and 4th Guards Armies were assigned to eliminate the encircled group in cooperation with elements of 3rd Ukrainian Front. The Axis force was estimated at between 60,000-70,000 men. During August 25, 73rd Corps was in a difficult situation. During the day it was forced to continue fighting in the Huși area with part of its forces while another part was to reach the Prut. German troops, pressed from the north by 48th Corps, broke into the northeastern outskirts of Huși in regimental strength, backed by four armored cars, but were counterattacked and defeated by elements of the 373rd and 294th Divisions, backed by the 110th Tank Brigade and army artillery. Overall the 52nd Army was unable to create a continuous front along the right bank of the Prut.

Overnight on August 25/26 a composite group of about 10,000 men of the LII Army Corps moved towards Huși and got into fighting with elements of 73rd Corps, with little success. Throughout the day the Corps continued in heavy fighting with an increasingly disorganized enemy. By the end of the day 52nd Army's forces had killed up to 12,000 enemy soldiers and officers and captured more than 8,500. Despite these heavy losses, enemy pressure on 52nd Army grew on August 27 as more of their forces crossed the Prut, almost entirely without vehicles or heavy weapons. One regiment of the 116th was struck by a powerful German group attempting to break through to the south from a forest north of Șișcani. The next day the division was ordered to attack toward Crețeștii de Jos along with one regiment of the 294th; at the end of the next day it occupied Grumezoaia and Hurdugi along the Prut. Overall, 52nd Army claimed up to 6,000 killed and more than 10,000 captured during August 29. At day's end one of the division's rifle regiments was in Sciopeni with the other two in line from Grumezoaia to Talaba, facing west. From August 30 to September 5 the 52nd Army mopped up the remnants of the Chișinău group, and on September 9 it was moved to the Reserve of the Supreme High Command. On September 15, for their roles in the destruction of the Chișinău grouping, several subunits of the 116th received decorations:

- 441st Rifle Regiment - Order of the Red Banner
- 548th Rifle Regiment - Order of Kutuzov, 3rd Degree
- 656th Rifle Regiment - Order of Alexander Nevsky
- 406th Artillery Regiment - Order of Alexander Nevsky

== Into Poland and Germany ==
Before the new year the 116th returned to 48th Corps, joining the 111th and 213th Rifle Divisions. It would remain in this Corps into the postwar. During the Vistula-Oder Offensive, by January 28, 1945, 52nd Army reached the Oder River on a 60km front north and south of Breslau with the 73rd and 78th Corps in first echelon and the 48th in second, and gained two bridgeheads over the river southeast of the city. Over the following week the Front carried out a complicated regrouping in the Breslau area. While 73rd Corps remained in place the 48th was to enter first echelon and, with 78th Corps, and concentrate in the Steinau–Leubsdorf–Wolau area. Overnight on February 3/4 the 48th relieved the right flank of 27th Rifle Corps (13th Army) from Luben to Jurtsch.

=== Lower Silesian Offensive ===
At the start of the offensive Koroteev's forces occupied a 105km-wide front. They would make their main attack with 48th and 78th Corps on the Army's right flank in the 20km Luben–Groß Kreidel sector. All three divisions of 48th Corps were in first echelon, with two regiments up and one back. The divisions each occupied a frontage of 3-3.5km, giving the greatest concentration of force on 52nd Army's front. Altogether the two Corps deployed 36,530 personnel, or 54 battalions. 3rd Guards Tank Army was in the rear, ready to exploit any breakthrough.

The offensive began on February 8 at 0930 hours, following a 50-minute artillery preparation. 48th Corps scored the greatest success on the first day. With 52nd Guards Tank Brigade in direct support the Corps quickly took Groß and Klein Krichen, captured Brauchitsdorf, and by the end of the day was fighting for Braunau. 52nd Guards Tanks had pushed through and reached Kotzenau. Altogether the German defense had been broken on a 14km-wide front and 48th Corps had advanced as much as 15km, while the forward detachments of 3rd Guards Tanks had pushed on as much as 10km farther. Despite this, Marshal Konev's assignment for the day had not been entirely met.

The Front commander's priority for February 9 was to seize crossings over the Bóbr River with all speed. 48th Corps attacked behind 6th Guards Tank Corps, which was engaging German units attempting to block the routes to Bunzlau. The Corps advanced as much as 15km during the day, arriving by dusk south of a line from Kotzenau to Hintereck to Fuchsmühle. 6th Guards Tanks had not consolidated its hold on Kotzenau, forcing elements of the 48th to retake it. During this second day the Front's right wing had completely broken the German tactical defense zone and expanded the breakthrough frontage to 70km. The next day the Corps continued to advance behind the tanks, suppressing scattered resistance, before reaching the Bóbr on the sector Ober Leschen–Groß Gollnishe after covering 25km.

During February 11 the 48th Corps forced the river with all three divisions in spite of heavy firepower and air attacks. After ferrying artillery and armored transports across the riverbank was cleared of resistance, after which a wooded area had to be covered to reach the Kweis River. This advance was slowed by the terrain and by the lack of tank support, as the 6th Guards did not have adequate crossing equipment. Despite this the Corps advanced 6km through the day and was halfway to the Kweis. The next day the 52nd and 3rd Guards Tank Armies began to turn toward Breslau, where a long-term siege would soon begin. Despite the difficulties of this advance, the 116th would assist 78th Corps in capturing Bunzlau, and for this success would be awarded the Order of Kutuzov, 2nd Degree, on April 5. On February 13 48th Corps, with the assistance of 13th Army, forced the Kweis and occupied all the strongpoints on left bank on the attack sector. Koroteev was now given permission to consolidate his forces, and the 73rd Corps, which had been left at Breslau for some time, was returned to his command, minus one division. By February 15 the Army's frontage was 120km wide, and it went over to the defensive on a line from Bunzlau to Liegnitz. Over the next five days 48th Corps was involved in difficult forest fighting with the 21st Panzer Division on the approaches to the lateral railroad from Lauban to Zorau. By the end of February 20 the Corps had reached a line from Leiten to Dobers while pursuing the defeated panzers.

=== Battle of Bautzen and Prague Offensive ===
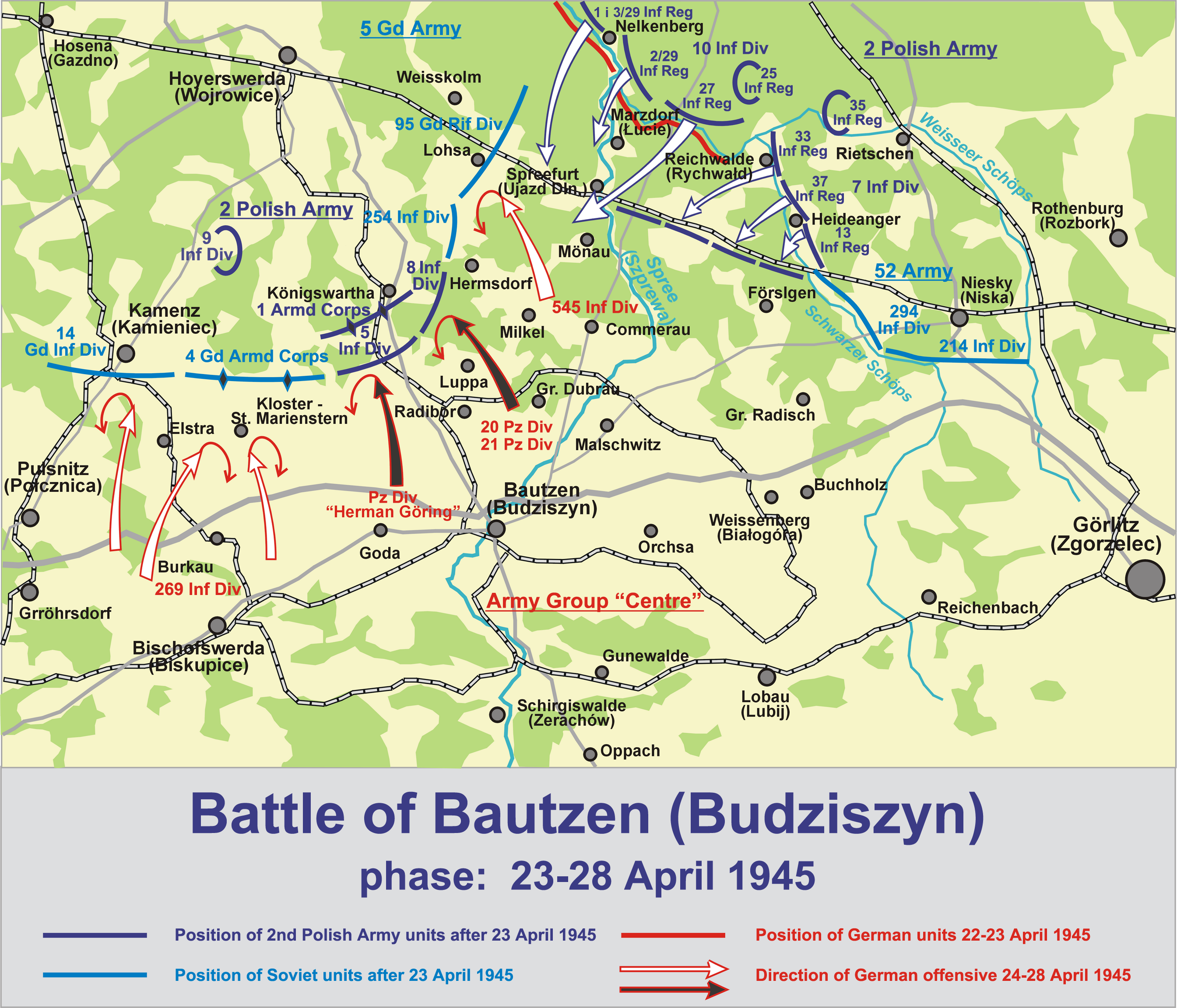
Battle of Bautzen. Note positions of 52nd Army.

At the start of the Berlin offensive on April 16 the forces of 52nd Army were split; four of its divisions formed part of 1st Ukrainian Front's auxiliary shock group, while the remaining five divisions, including the 116th, were deployed on a 101km defensive front along the Neisse from Penzig to Jauer. 48th Corps had the 116th and 294th in a single echelon, while the 213th formed Koroteev's reserve. The Army had the 7th Guards Mechanized Corps in its second echelon. 73rd Corps, which formed the Army's share of the shock group, quickly forced a crossing of the river despite repeated counterattacks by the Brandenburg Panzergrenadier Division.

On April 20 the 20th Panzer and 72nd Infantry Divisions counterattacked from south of Diehsa and managed to cut the road from Niesky to Bautzen, threatening the communications of 2nd Polish Army. The 116th reinforced the 52nd Army's shock group which engaged the German Görlitz grouping and several towns changed hands repeatedly. The following day the 48th Corps, backed by 1st Tank Corps, was committed against the German divisions in the area of Spreutz to prevent them getting any farther into the Polish rear. Encountering fierce resistance the combined force made little headway. On April 22 the shock group continued battling the Görlitz grouping along its entire front. The German force carried out a regrouping overnight in order to attack the boundary between 2nd Polish and 52nd Armies which came on the morning of the 23rd. Two infantry divisions reinforced with over 100 tanks and assault guns struck the right flank of 48th Corps on the Ugist axis, with a secondary force moving on Bautzen from the southeast. Under the weight of the attack the Corps was thrown back from its positions and, having been broken up into separate groups, was involved in heavy fighting throughout the day while partially encircled in the area Weisenberg–Ober Prauske–Gross Radisch. The German grouping reached the area south of Klitten.

Having broken the front of 48th Corps the German grouping attempted to develop its offensive northward toward Spremberg on April 24 by committing the Brandenburg Division. By the end of the day the Corps had fallen back in heavy fighting to a line from Spreutz to Jenkendorf. Meanwhile 2nd Polish and 52nd Armies, with reinforcements from 5th Guards Army, managed to stabilize the front. The next day the Corps received orders to attack with the objective of reaching Ober Prauske and Diehsa by the 27th after tying in with 2nd Polish in the Guttau area. After gaining an additional 10km in the Bautzen area on the 26th the German offensive ran out of steam and the entire grouping went over to the defensive on April 30. After the fall of Berlin the 52nd Army took part in the drive on Prague in the final days of the war.

== Postwar ==
When the shooting stopped the men and women of the division shared the full title of 116th Rifle, Kharkov, Order of the Red Banner, Order of Kutuzov Division. Under the terms of STAVKA Order No. 11096, part 7, of May 29, 48th Corps was to withdraw to Częstochowa, Poland, prior to being transferred with the rest of 52nd Army to the Northern Group of Forces. As of June 12, 1946, the division was at Zhytomyr when it was disbanded with five others to form a group of mechanized divisions. General Smirnov went on to a varied career within the Soviet Army, first in the Military Pedagogical Institute, then in the Small Arms Technical Committee, and finally in the Moscow Institute of Foreign Trade before his retirement in October 1954.

In August 1948 a new 116th would be formed on the basis of the 31st Rifle Brigade. It would become the 67th Rifle Division in 1956 at Murmansk, and would be disbanded at the same place in 1960.

In 1968, the number "116" was chosen for a newly-formed mobilization motor rifle division located at Nagorny in Murmansk. That division became a Weapons and Equipment Storage Base (VKhVT) in 1989.
