= 196th Rifle Division =

196th Rifle Division (March 14, 1941 – December 27, 1941) 196th Rifle Division (November 22, 1941 – 1946)
- Active: 1941–1946
- Country: Soviet Union
- Branch: Red Army
- Type: Infantry
- Size: Division
- Engagements: Operation Barbarossa; Battle of Uman; Battle of Kiev (1941); Battle of Stalingrad; Siege of Leningrad; Mga offensive Leningrad–Novgorod offensive Krasnoye Selo–Ropsha offensive Baltic offensive Pskov-Ostrov operation Riga offensive (1944); Courland Pocket
- Decorations: Order of the Red Banner (2nd formation)
- Battle honours: Gatchina (2nd Formation)

Commanders
- Notable commanders: Maj. Gen. Konstantin Efimovich Kulikov; Kombrig Dmitrii Vasilevich Averin; Col. Vasilii Polikarpovich Ivanov; Maj. Gen. Pyotr Filippovich Ratov; Col. Nikolai Vasilevich Parshukov

The 196th Rifle Division was an infantry division of the Red Army, originally formed as part of the prewar buildup of forces, based on the shtat (table of organization and equipment) of September 13, 1939. It began forming just months before the German invasion in the Odessa Military District. When the German invasion began it was in the 7th Rifle Corps, in the District reserves. The Corps was soon moved to the reserves of Southwestern Front, and by mid-July the division had joined 26th Army as a separate division. It took part in battles on both sides of the Dniepr River during August until it was finally encircled and destroyed in September, although it remained on the books of the Red Army until December.

A new 196th was created from the 424th Rifle Division, which had been formed in the South Ural Military District in November. After several months of forming up and training it was moved west, eventually joining the 7th Reserve Army, with was redesignated in early July as the 62nd Army in Stalingrad Front. Late that month, it was briefly encircled in the Great Bend of the Don River west of Kalach and suffered considerable losses in breaking out to the east bank, including the death of its commander. Throughout August and September it took part in the fighting that drove its Army step by step back to Stalingrad itself, ebbing in strength, until it took up positions in the salient around Orlovka, west of the Dzerzhinskii Tractor Factory, by now reduced to a composite rifle regiment. In the last days of September it was ordered to leave the salient and moved east of the Volga, before heading north to begin a lengthy rebuilding. In March 1943 it was awarded the Order of the Red Banner for its role in the defense of Stalingrad. By this time it had arrived in the reserves of Leningrad Front, and was eventually assigned to 55th Army and later 67th Army. In September, under this command, it played a secondary role in the battle that finally liberated the heights around Sinyavino. At the start of the winter offensive that drove Army Group North away from Leningrad the 196th was part of 2nd Shock Army in the Oranienbaum bridgehead, but it was transferred to 42nd Army after the linkup south of Ropsha. Not long after, the division was awarded a battle honor. During most of 1944 it rotated through a large number of Corps and Army commands in both 3rd Baltic and Leningrad Fronts until it finally returned to 67th Army in the latter after the capture of Riga, where two of its regiments also gained battle honors. It served the remainder of the war in Latvia, helping to contain the German forces trapped in the Courland Pocket. It was disbanded in the Kiev Military District in 1946.

== 1st Formation ==
The division began forming on March 14, 1941, as part of the prewar buildup of Soviet forces, at Dnepropetrovsk in the Odessa Military District. Its order of battle was as follows:

- 863rd Rifle Regiment
- 884th Rifle Regiment
- 893rd Rifle Regiment
- 725th Artillery Regiment
- 739th Howitzer Artillery Regiment
- 228th Antitank Battalion
- 484th Antiaircraft Battalion
- 262nd Reconnaissance Battalion
- 353rd Sapper Battalion
- 572nd Signal Battalion
- 99th Medical/Sanitation Battalion
- 190th Degassing Platoon
- 285th Motor Transport Battalion
- 340th Field Bakery
- 724th Field Postal Station
- 562nd Field Office of the State Bank

Maj. Gen. Konstantin Efimovich Kulikov took command the day the division began forming, and held this post for the duration the 1st formation. This officer had been leading the 39th Rifle Division in late 1938 when he was arrested and imprisoned during the Great Purge. Released the next year, he was made head of the Dnepropetrovsk Reserve Officers' Advanced Training Course, where he remained until shortly before the 196th began forming. His chief of staff was Lt. Col. Vasilii Mitrofanovich Shatilov.

== Battle of Kyiv ==
At the start of the German invasion the division was in the 7th Rifle Corps with the 116th and 206th Rifle Divisions in the reserves of Odessa Military District. After a little over a week of frantic mobilization, at the end of June the entire Corps was moved north and assigned to the reserves of Southwestern Front. As of July 1 the 116th Division had been replaced by the 147th Rifle Division.

The 196th and 206th Divisions made up 7th Corps on July 10, under command of 6th Army. At this time the division was en route to Cherkasy on the Dniepr River, arriving there on July 11. It was now loaded onto 17 trains at Korsun station and moved by rail to Guta-Dmitrinskaya on July 19, where it joined 26th Army. At this time this Army, along with the 6th and 12th Armies, was threatened with encirclement near Uman. 26th Army managed to avoid this fate by falling back toward Kyiv, and by the end of July 23 the 196th was attempting to hold south of Bohuslav against the divisions of the III Motorized Corps. The next day it counterattacked with some success, retaking several villages. As of August 1 it had left 7th Corps and was fighting as a separate division in 26th Army.

During August, the 196th was reassigned to the new 38th Army, still in Southwestern Front. By the end of August 11 it was back at Korsun-Shevchenkivskyi, which it liberated with the help of a tank company. By August 19, it had fallen back again, to Cherkasy, which it was contesting with its remaining 1,500 men. After crossing to the east bank of the Dniepr it was pulled back to a reserve position in the Semenivka area by early September. 1st Panzer Group broke out of its bridgehead at Kremenchuk on September 12 and began driving north to link up with 2nd Panzer Group deep in the rear of Southwestern Front. The two linked up on September 15 and the 196th was caught in the trap.

General Kulikov led several attempts to break out of the pocket, but these were largely unsuccessful. Lt. Colonel Shatilov managed to escape, and wrote after the war:

... While analyzing the events of that bitter fall, one must conclude that the very word "encirclement" paralyzed the will of some commanders and staff officers... Now, you know, that one ought not disperse [his] strength, but rather, unite it in order to create shock groups to assault the enemy ring, and, undoubtedly, they would burst out. This would have reduced the losses which accompanied a disorganized breakout from encirclement. I believe that all those in the front and army staff knew this well. However, they were unable to alter the situation. They lost command and control of their forces, and this is the heart of the matter.

Shatilov would go on to command the 182nd and 150th Rifle Divisions and reached the rank of colonel general before his retirement in 1964. Kulikov was wounded and captured on September 27; he was eventually sent to Flossenbürg concentration camp in February 1943 and died there, probably of tuberculosis, on or around June 30, 1944. The 196th had been destroyed, but it lingered in the Red Army order of battle until December 27, like many of the divisions lost in the Kyiv battle.

== 2nd Formation ==
A new 196th was designated in January 1942, based on the 424th Rifle Division, which had formed on November 22, 1941, in the South Ural Military District. Its order of battle was similar to that of the first formation:

- 863rd Rifle Regiment
- 884th Rifle Regiment
- 893rd Rifle Regiment
- 725th Artillery Regiment
- 228th Antitank Battalion
- 262nd Reconnaissance Company
- 353rd Sapper Battalion
- 455th Signal Battalion (later 562nd Battalion, 453rd Company)
- 99th Medical/Sanitation Battalion
- 506th Chemical Defense (Anti-gas) Company
- 239th Motor Transport Company
- 423rd Field Bakery
- 888th Divisional Veterinary Hospital
- 1678th Field Postal Station
- 1251st Field Office of the State Bank (later 1079th)

Kombrig Dmitrii Vasilevich Averin was transferred from the 199th Rifle Division on January 9 to take command. At about this time it was reported that the personnel of the division were roughly 80 percent of Kazakh nationality, with the bulk of the remainder being Russian. It remained in the South Ural District into April, when it was moved to the Reserve of the Supreme High Command for the first stage of its deployment. At the beginning of June it was in the 6th Reserve Army. A month later it was in 7th Reserve Army, which was designated as 62nd Army on July 10 and assigned to Stalingrad Front.

== Battle of Stalingrad ==
62nd Army was under command of Maj. Gen. V. Ya. Kolpakchi and consisted of six rifle divisions (196th, 192nd, 147th, 181st, 184th, and 33rd Guards). In orders from the STAVKA on July 12 it was stated, in part:

4. The mission of the Stalingrad Front is to occupy the Stalingrad line west of the Don River firmly, with 62nd and 64th Armies... and under no circumstances permit an enemy penetration east of this line toward Stalingrad.

This order set the stage for the battle in the Great Bend of the Don.

=== Fighting in the Don Bend ===
German 6th Army was ordered to continue its eastward advance as soon as possible after July 17, but this was delayed by heavy rains; it was not until the 20th that LI Army Corps' lead divisions were able to engage and defeat the forward elements of 62nd Army on the Tsutskan River. By late on the next day five of the Army's divisions were deployed uniformly south to north across the Great Bend of the Don from Surovikino on the Chir River to Kletskaya on the Don. The 196th was responsible for a 30 km-wide sector directly south of Surovikino; it had 11,428 personnel on strength, the lowest in the Army by a small margin. On July 22 the XIV Panzer Corps and VIII Army Corps caught up and by the evening Kolpakchi reported that his divisions were engaging German tanks and infantry all along the line. The 3rd and 60th Motorized and 16th Panzer Divisions advanced rapidly the next day, tearing through 62nd Army's forward security belt and advancing 24–40 km, about halfway to the crossing points over the Don at Trekhostrovskaya and Kalach. By this time the 6th Army commander, Army Gen. F. Paulus, was planning to encircle 62nd Army west of the Don with his XIV Panzer and VIII Corps as a preliminary to an advance on Stalingrad.

Paulus' two pincers made substantial advances on July 24. His two motorized divisions sliced through the 192nd Division on the Army's left wing and moved more than 50 km southeast to within 10 km of Kalach. 16th Panzer and the 113th Infantry Division penetrated the center of the line and forced Kolpakchi's forces back another 15 km towards the Don. By the end of the day the 33rd Guards, 192nd and 184th were loosely encircled on the high ground in the Maiorovskii region along with the 40th Tank Brigade and 644th Tank Battalion. At this critical moment XIV Panzer Corps had to slow its advance due to acute fuel shortages and stiff resistance north of Kalach. Early the next day, Kolpakchi organized a counterattack to support the 13th Tank Corps and halt and drive back 6th Army's northern pincer before it reached Kalach. The 196th and the 649th Tank Battalion were to attack northward along the Liska River toward Skvorin, 25 km northwest of Kalach and help the 13th Tanks rescue the encircled grouping. However, this effort, along with other counterattacks, were too disjointed to have any prospects of real success.

Through July 25–26 the two German pincers fought hard to complete their encirclement against sharply increasing Soviet attacks. VIII Corps' 113th and 100th Jäger Divisions, supported by most of 16th Panzer's tanks, had to simultaneously contain two Soviet bridgeheads south of the Don, defeat and destroy the encircled grouping, and fend off attempts to relieve the pocket. The overall position of 6th Army became more difficult as the new 1st and 4th Tank Armies entered the fray. Late on July 27, Kolpakchi reported that the 196th had reached the line from Marker 146.0 to Marker 111.6 to Skvorin. The following day he reported that the division, with the 131st Rifle Division and the 28th Tank Corps, repulsed two counterattacks, knocking out or destroying up to 40 German tanks. In confused fighting through the last days of the month the 13th Tank Corps managed to break through to the pocket and then led a much-reduced force to the lines of 4th Tank Army late on July 31.

==== German Advance to Kalach ====
62nd Army now attempted to hold a bridgehead across the Don west of Kalach. From August 1–6 the German 6th Army was forced to stand motionless due to further shortages of fuel. During this time it obtained infantry reinforcements. On August 3, 62nd Army came under command of Lt. Gen. A. I. Lopatin. The Army had a total of eight rifle divisions, including the 196th, two tank corps, four tank brigades, plus other forces, within the bridgehead, a total of roughly 100,000 personnel and something less than 150 tanks. The division was positioned in the western sector. Attacking southward on August 7 from the Maiorovskii region, 30 km northwest of Kalach, multiple battlegroups of 16th Panzer smashed through the defenses of 33rd Guards and 131st Divisions and reached the northern outskirts of the town by nightfall. The remaining units in the bridgehead fared no better from the tank and infantry onslaught and shortly after dark the 24th Panzer Division linked up with the 16th to complete its encirclement. At day's end the 196th was reported as "fighting in encirclement in the Plesistovskii and Silkina Balka region."

The next day the two panzer divisions began pressing the eastern face of the pocket back towards the west while divisions of the LI, XI Army and XXIV Panzer Corps drove in other sectors of the perimeter. A further report at the end of the day stated that elements of the 196th and 399th Rifle Divisions had made their way to safety east of the Don. This escape came at a cost. With the divisional headquarters surrounded and under attack in Silkina Balka on August 7, Kombrig Averin made the decision to save the divisional banner. It was entrusted to battalion commissar I. S. Zhelamskii, who hid it under his tunic. Two breakout groups were formed, one headed by Averin and the other by Zhelamskii. After just 300m Averin's group came under fire and a battle went on from 1500 to 2100 hours. At this time, while scouting for an escape route, Averin and his political officer came under artillery fire; the former was killed and the latter wounded. Zhelamskii was able to escape with the banner, but up to 6,000 personnel became casualties. Col. Vasilii Polikarpovich Ivanov would take over command on August 17; he had previously served as deputy commander of the 199th Division.

It took Paulus's army another three days to totally eradicate the Kalach pocket. The 196th was claimed as destroyed, but Soviet documents indicate that most of the 196th's surviving soldiers escaped to fight another day, probably no more than 20 percent of its authorized strength. As well, the tank strength of Paulus's panzer and motorized divisions declined by roughly 20 percent during the operation.

=== Defense of the City ===
On August 13, Col. Gen. A. I. Yeryomenko took over command of Stalingrad Front and immediately put into effect plans for the defense of the city that he had developed with the STAVKA. 62nd Army was to "occupy and firmly defend" the 90 km-wide sector from Lake Peschanoe to the mouth of the Donskaya Tsaritsa River, protecting the most direct route to the city and providing cover for the divisions that had escaped encirclement. In mid-August the division was moved back the reserves of the newly created Southeastern Front, together with 33rd Guards and 214th Rifle Division for a much-needed refitting. When 6th Army began its drive for the Volga on August 21 the division was helping to man an intermediate defensive line roughly 20 km east of the Don from Trekhostrovskaya southward to Kalach along with the 35th Guards and 87th Rifle Divisions plus several smaller units. On August 23 it was reported as preparing a defense along the Malaya Rossoshka–Novo-Alekseevka line, 22–25 km southeast of Vertyachy. This was preempted when 16th Panzer and 3rd Motorized Divisions struck out of their bridgehead at the latter place at 0430 hours in an all-out push for Stalingrad. The next day the 196th, with the Ordzhonikidze Infantry School, went over to the counterattack in an effort to recapture the Peskovatka region, but this had little effect.

Under the impact of the German thrust the defenders of 62nd Army had no choice but to recoil to the south. At about 1500 hours the leading elements of the German columns were approaching Stalingrad's northern suburbs of Rynok and Latashanka. By evening, 16th Panzer had reached the high bank above the Volga and set up an all-round defense. By August 24 the 196th was defending the sector from Novo-Alekseevskii west to Dmitrievka with the 33rd Guards and four battalions of the 115th Fortified Region. At dawn on August 26 the LI Corps began a general assault against 62nd Army which drove back the 196th towards the Rossoshka, and in the last days of the month the remainder of the Army withdrew to that line as well.

As of September 3, the 62nd had come under command of Yeryomenko's Southeastern Front. On this date the 196th was located in the area of Opytnaya Station, some 10 km due west of the center of the factory district. It was supported by the 50th Machine Gun-Artillery Battalion of 115th Fortified Region, the 236th NKVD Rifle Regiment, and four guns of the 398th Tank Destroyer Regiment. It was tasked with defending prepared positions along the Talovoi, Ezhovka, Babaevo and Opytnaya Station line to prevent a German penetration toward the southwest and prepare counterattacks toward Gumrak, Ezhovka, and Voroponovo. While this looked impressive on paper, in fact the division was a shell of its former self. Lopatin could do no more than dispatch the 38th Motorized Rifle Brigade to back it, and the 33rd Guards.

At dawn on September 3, LI Corps renewed its assault. The 191st Regiment of 71st Infantry Division demolished the 196th's defenses and captured Talovoi, Opytnaya Station, and Ezhovka, inflicting heavy losses on the defenders before a counterattack by divisional reserves, plus those of the 87th and 112th Rifle Divisions halted further progress of the 71st west of the hospital. This fighting, which drove a deep wedge into the Army's defenses south of Gumrak, so decimated the 87th and 196th that they literally disappeared from its order of battle within a matter of days. September 4 saw the 71st renew its advance, forcing the remnants of the 196th and 33rd Guards back southeastward toward Opytnaya Station and the wooded northern slopes of the Tsaritsa River valley. There they reinforced the defenses of the 42nd Rifle Brigade. During the next day the 196th and the northern regiment of the 244th Rifle Division clung to their defenses on the northern bank of the Tsaritsa northeast of Ezhovka. On September 7, the two divisions and the 42nd Brigade repelled several assaults by the 71st and finally contained its drive at Sadovaya and Razgulaevka Stations, only 8–10 km northeast of Mamayev Kurgan. By now the 196th had under 500 "bayonets"(riflemen and sappers) still fighting, and on September 11 its total personnel strength was recorded as 1,004. The previous day it had been reorganized as a composite rifle regiment and, with the help of two other small units, repelled two German attacks in the afternoon and evening, inflicting heavy losses on submachine gunners attempting to filter through the lines toward Orlovka.

==== The Orlovka Salient ====
Lt. Gen. V. I. Chuikov took over 62nd Army from Lopatin on September 12. Anticipating an assault into the city itself, he was frantically attempting to shore up his defenses, appointing Col. K. M. Andriusenko to command of the forces around Orlovka, consisting of the 196th Composite, the 724th Rifle Regiment, the 115th, 124th, 149th Rifle, and 2nd Motorized Brigades. All of these were at minimal effective strength. At the end of September 14, Chuikov's headquarters reported:

115th RB, 2nd MRB, 724th RR, and composite regiment, 196th RD, were attacked by a battalion of enemy infantry [advancing] from the north toward Orlovka at 1500 hours, and the battalion was destroyed.

At the same time, it reported that the 196th was down to 548 men. Despite this, late on September 16 the Army's summary stated that these forces, now designated the Northern Combat Sector, were continuing to defend their previous positions.

Late on September 18, Chuikov issued orders for counterattacks against the German forces that had penetrated into the city, but the Northern Combat Sector was to continue to hold the Orlovka region against Group Stahel and two regiments of the 389th Infantry Division. The STAVKA put a priority on holding the salient as it was 62nd Army's closest position to the Soviet armies north of the German Don–Volga corridor; a series of offensives from the Kotluban area would be launched to try to sever it. The following day it was reported that the 115th Brigade and the 196th composite regiment continued to hold while repelling counterattacks. While street fighting raged within the city later in the month the situation around Orlovka was largely unchanged as of September 25. By this time the composite regiment was designated as the 893rd, and it was defending the hollow southwest of Hill 147.6 to Marker 108.8 to Marker 129.1.

As the fighting moved into the workers' villages of the Krasny Oktyabr and Barrikady factories, Paulus shifted part of his attention to reducing the Orlovka salient. In addition to tying down German forces it separated the XIV Panzer Corps from LI Corps. As of September 28 it contained roughly 6,500 men supported by 50 76mm guns, 200 mortars, 36 antitank guns, 72 heavy machine guns, and 150 antitank rifles. The 893rd Regiment continued to hold along its previous line. Overnight, two regiments of the 94th Infantry Division redeployed from southern Stalingrad to reinforce the attack, which was to begin in the morning, but coincidentally Colonel Ivanov got orders to withdraw his threadbare division from the salient in preparation for regrouping across the Volga. As of October 1 it was in the reserves of Stalingrad Front.

== Redeployment to the North ==
By the beginning of November the 196th was in the Moscow Defense Zone for a substantial rebuilding, and it remained there into January 1943. On December 12, Colonel Ivanov left his command, being replaced by Maj. Gen. Pyotr Filippovich Ratov. Ivanov soon took command of the 10th Guards Airborne Division, and later the 11th and 114th Guards Airborne. He was promoted to the rank of major general in February 1943, and retired in 1955 as commander of the 128th Guards Rifle Division. Ratov had been serving as an intelligence officer since 1939.

As of the start of February the division was in the Reserve of the Supreme High Command, and by a month later it was in the reserves of Leningrad Front. On March 31 it was awarded the Order of the Red Banner in recognition of its role in the defense of Stalingrad. From April to August it was assigned to 55th Army in Leningrad Front, directly south of the city.

=== Mga (Sixth Sinyavino) Offensive ===
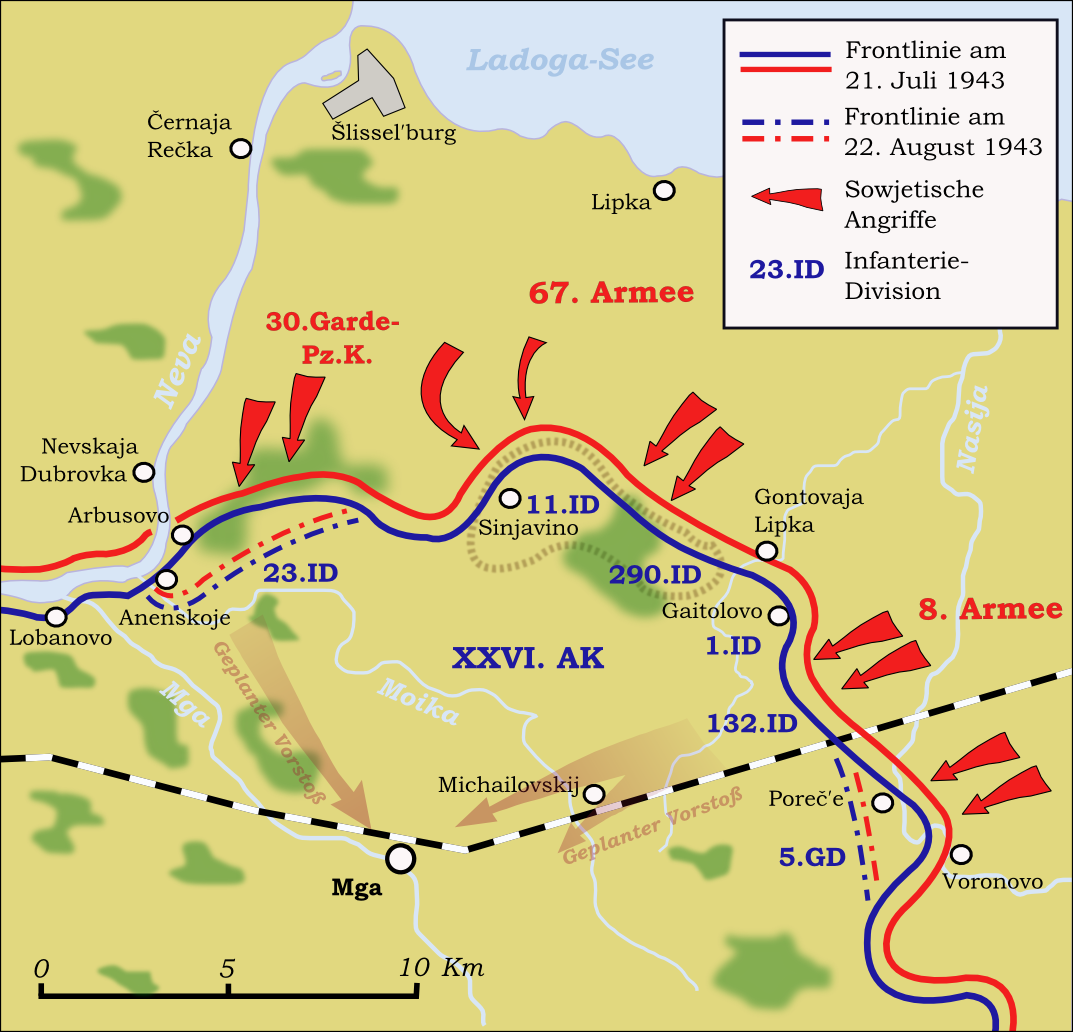
Mga (Fifth and Sixth Sinyavino) Offensive

In August the 196th was transferred to 67th Army, somewhat to the east, but still in Leningrad Front. The Army was located in the western half of the land corridor to the city that had been opened during Operation Iskra in January. On July 22 the 67th and 55th Armies, plus the 8th Army of Volkhov Front, had begun the Fifth Sinyavino Offensive in a renewed effort to take that place as well as Mga. The fighting continued until August 22, although the two sides had come to a standstill by August 4, with the Sinyavino Heights still in German hands and Mga still well in the rear.

The offensive was renewed on September 15. The capture of the Heights was considered crucial to both sides as its possession allowed German artillery observation over the supply lines through the corridor. As in the previous effort, the attack would be led by the 30th Guards Rifle Corps, which was attached to 67th Army. This Corps would be supported on its left by a shock group consisting of the 43rd and 123rd Rifle Divisions, while its right flank support shock group included the 120th, 124th, and 196th Divisions. The German 18th Army was currently defending the sector from the Neva River through Sinyavino to Gaitolovo with its XXVI Army Corps of seven divisions. Sinyavino and its Heights were being held by the 11th and 290th Infantry Divisions.

Based on past experience, the Front commander, Col. Gen. L. A. Govorov, and the Army commander, Lt. Gen. M. P. Dukhanov, both recognized that changes had to be made to the pattern of artillery support:

The battle that had occurred here previously demonstrated that, for success in the attack, it was insufficient to suppress and destroy the enemy firing points and achieve fire superiority. [Instead] it was necessary to destroy the trenches and communications trenches thoroughly to deprive the enemy of the capability for exploiting them for maneuver. One had to change the method of artillery preparation, which had become stereotypical. Usually the enemy soldiers waited through it [the preparation] in "foxes' lairs" and other shelters, and, when the fire shifted into the depth of the defense, they hurried back to the forward trenches in order to greet the attackers with organized fires.

What Govorov and his chief of artillery ordered was that the two hitherto distinct phases of the so-called artillery offensive–the artillery preparation and fires in support of the attack–be combined into a single phase. What resulted was fire that "crept" into the depth of the defense as the infantry advanced, preventing detection of the interval between phases as the preparation proceeded.

The artillery assault worked as planned, and in a 30-minute struggle the 30th Guards Corps seized the Heights that had cost so many lives. Despite this success, the flanking divisions, including the 196th, bogged down after three days of heavy fighting and the STAVKA allowed Govorov to halt the offensive on September 18. Quick reaction by German tactical reserves contained the drive before it could penetrate toward Mga in the lowlands to the south. By September 25 a period of relative calm descended over the front south of Leningrad.

== Leningrad-Novgorod Offensive ==
Later in the month the 196th was pulled back into the reserves of Leningrad Front. It remained there into December, and during that month it was assigned to the 108th Rifle Corps, still in Leningrad Front reserves. In early January 1944, prior to the offensive that would finally drive 18th Army away from Leningrad for good, the Corps was reassigned to 2nd Shock Army. Govorov faced the daunting task of transferring this entire Army to the Oranienbaum bridgehead to the west of Leningrad. He did so by employing the Baltic Fleet's forces to transport the Army via the ice roads over the Gulf of Finland. The entire process lasted until January 21, after the offensive had begun. A total of five divisions, including the 196th, 13 reserve artillery regiments, two tank and 1 self-propelled artillery regiment, one tank brigade, and hundred of wagon loads of supplies made the crossing unknown to German intelligence, aided by the very long winter nights at this latitude.

=== Krasnoe Selo-Ropsha Offensive ===
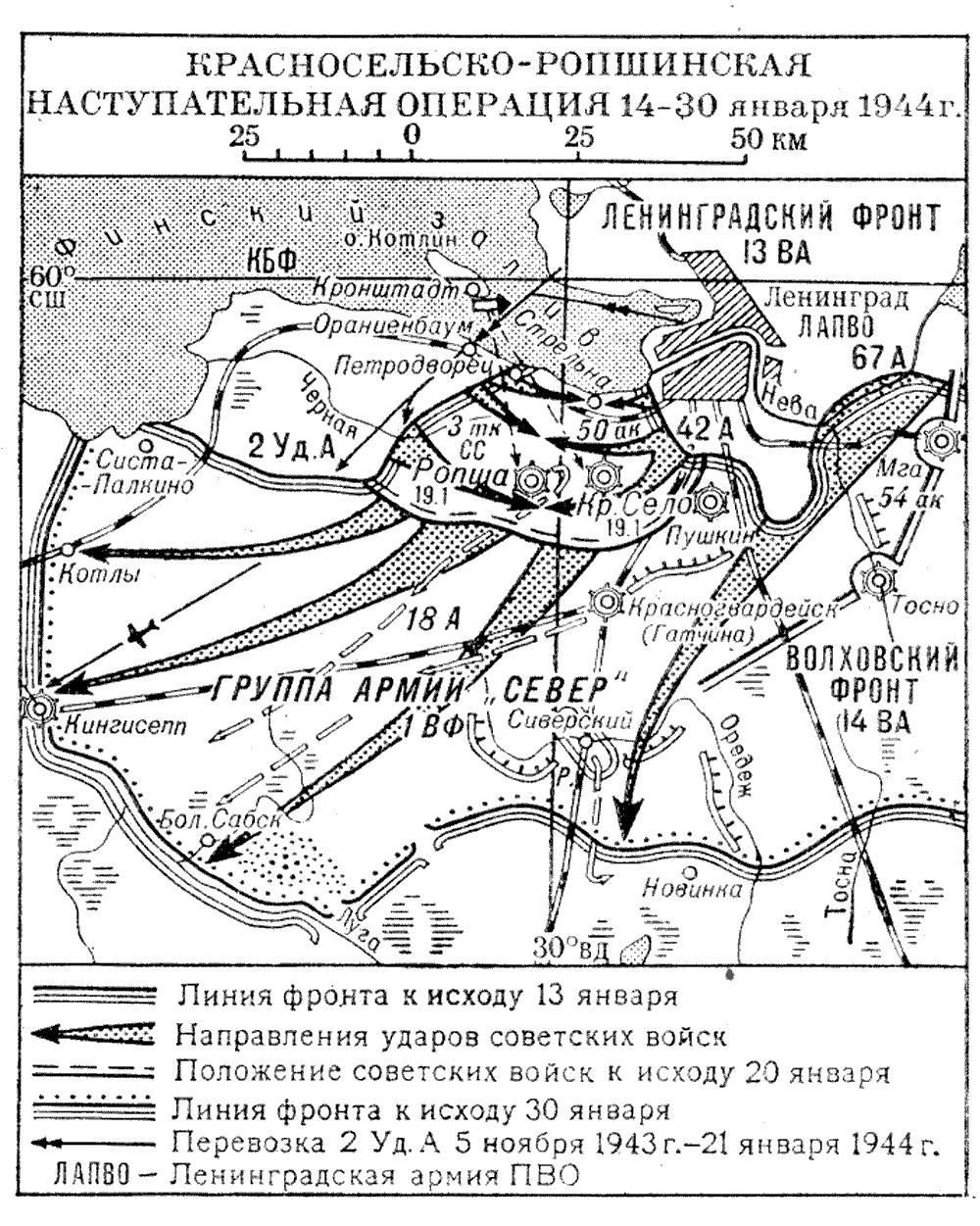
Krasnoe Selo-Ropsha Offensive. Note initial positions of 2nd Shock Army.

The offensive began on January 14. The final offensive concept required the 2nd Shock and 42nd Armies to penetrate the German defenses along the eastern flank of the bridgehead and near Pulkovo southwest of Leningrad, link up at Ropsha, and encircle and destroy the German forces in the Krasnoye Selo, Ropsha, and Strelna regions. After capturing these initial objectives the two Armies were to advance southwest toward Kingisepp and south toward Krasnogvardeysk. The 108th Corps and the 152nd Tank Brigade were in second echelon of 2nd Shock, and were to strengthen the offensive by attacking toward Krasnoye Selo in case the initial assault failed. Otherwise, it was to initiate a pursuit to the south.

The assault began with air attacks overnight followed by a massive 65-minute artillery preparation and by the day's end the 2nd Shock Army's first echelon had gained as much as 3 km on a 10 km-wide sector with 42nd Army's artillery providing support:

The avalanche of shells had hardly rolled into the depth of the enemy's defenses when three divisions of the 2nd Shock Army, the 48th, 90th, and 131st, rose up in attack from Oranienbaum. It was 1040 hours. Soon red flags began appearing above the enemy's positions as if they were tongues of flame.

Overnight, the 90th and 131st Divisions, with tank support, advanced 4 km deeper into the second German defensive position. 42nd Army began its assault at 1100 hours on January 15 following a similar bombardment but its leading troops faced heavier resistance from three divisions of L Army Corps and it soon degenerated into a slugfest.

2nd Shock succeeded in penetrating the entire depth of the main defensive belt by the end of January 16. The next morning the Army commander threw in a small mobile group, consisting of 152nd Tanks, the self-propelled regiment, a truck-mounted infantry battalion, a light artillery battalion, and three sapper battalions, also on trucks, with orders to take and hold Ropsha. However, this was halted halfway to its objective. Despite this, by the end of the day only 18 km separated the two Soviet armies, and 18th Army had committed its last reserves. 2nd Shock surged forward on January 18, with 108th Corps being committed from second echelon early in the day. Ropsha was taken on January 19 and at 2100 hours one regiment of the 196th's corps-mate, the 168th Rifle Division, linked up with 42nd Army just south of the town. The next morning the encirclement was solidified, trapping the German forces still fighting to the north.

On January 24, as part of a general regrouping within the Front, the 108th Corps was transferred to 42nd Army. On January 22 the Army commander, Col. Gen. I. I. Maslennikov, had ordered his main shock group to assault German defenses around Gatchina at 1300 hours after a 15-minute artillery raid. This was led by the 123rd and 117th Rifle Corps, while 110th Rifle Corps advanced on Pushkin and Slutsk from the west and while the latter made progress the main attack hung up on powerful defenses. The effort was renewed on January 25 and finally the next day at 1000 hours the town was cleared, while the 108th Corps had advanced 5 km, cutting the rail line to the west, before encountering a German infantry battalion with 15 antitank guns and a company of Tiger tanks, which brought the advance to an abrupt halt. In recognition the division received a battle honor:

GATCHINA (KRASNOGVARDEISK) - ...196th Rifle Division (Major General Ratov, Pyotr Filippovich)... By order of the Supreme High Command of 26 January 1944 and a commendation in Moscow, the troops who participated in the battles for the liberation of Krasnogvardeisk are given a salute of 12 artillery salvoes from 124 guns.

42nd Army continued its advance over the next few days against dwindling resistance and captured the important German supply base at Volosovo. Its spearheads reached the Luga River on January 30 and captured several bridgeheads. By this time German 18th Army's left flank and center were in full retreat.

=== To the Panther Line ===
On February 7 the Army fought a meeting engagement with elements of Army Group North attempting to take up positions for a counterattack southwest of Luga and east of Lake Peipus. The Army advanced to the south in a single echelon from west of the Plyussa River to the east bank of the lake. 116th and 123rd Corps regrouped during February 6–8 and prepared to assault southeastward toward the Luga–Pskov railroad but their advance the next day ran into the German counterattack force, most of which had not yet reached its designated positions. Later, on February 10 the 12th Panzer Division began a planned counterattack ran directly into the 196th and 128th Divisions and 168th Division of 123rd Corps, which were attempting to encircle German forces defending Iamm Station from the east. Although the panzers managed to halt the 128th, they were themselves halted, which brought Army Group North's overall counterstrike to a conclusion.

With the failure of this attack, 18th Army was ordered to abandon Luga, which took place on February 12. The Army was now directed to commence a general withdrawal to the Panther Line, which was to be complete by March 1. During this period the 196th was transferred to 123rd Corps, still in 42nd Army. Maslennikov ordered the 123rd and 116th Corps to continue their attack to the south and southeast to finally cut the Luga–Pskov railroad. Although the two Corps managed to capture Shchir and reach the outskirts of Plyussa they were unable to overcome German resistance and capture the latter place or Strugi Krasnye. 18th Army was able to use the railroad for its withdrawal in relative safety. The 123rd and 108th Corps now drove down the east shore of Lake Peipus toward Pskov. By the end of February many of the Front's rifle divisions had been reduced by 2,500 to 3,500 men each. On March 2, Govorov ordered his 42nd and 67th Armies to "liberate Pskov and Ostrov no later than 10 March and then force the Velikaia River." Sources differ as to the length of this fighting, which may have continued into early April, but the defenses of the Panther Line were not significantly breached.

== Baltic Offensives ==
General Ratov had left his command on March 16, handing over to Col. Nikolai Andrianovich Vonogradov until he returned on April 19. By the start of April the division was back in 108th Corps, which was now in the Front reserves. Later in the month it returned to 2nd Shock Army as part of 109th Rifle Corps. As of June 1 it was part of 124th Rifle Corps in the same Army. The division continued its peregrinations later that month when it was moved, with its Corps, to 8th Army.

The fighting for the Panther Line resumed on July 8, but it did not immediately involve the 196th, which was moving southwest through Strugi Krasnye around July 12. Ostrov was liberated on July 21 and by the start of August the division was located near that town, now as part of 12th Guards Rifle Corps in 1st Shock Army of 3rd Baltic Front. On August 30, Ratov left the division again; from 1945 to 1947 he would serve as head of the Soviet Repatriation Committee in Great Britain and Norway. Col. Nikolai Vasilevich Parshukov took over the 196th for the duration of the war. At this time the division was located near Antsla in southern Estonia, back in 67th Army as part of the 111th Rifle Corps, still in 3rd Baltic Front. The 196th remained under these commands for the duration.

By the first week of October the Army had reached the Gulf of Riga in the vicinity of Salacgrīva, Latvia, before moving south toward the Latvian capital. After the city was taken, two of the division's regiments received its name as an honorific:

RIGA - ...884th Rifle Regiment (Lt. Colonel Shablygin, Nikolai Alekseevich)... 725th Artillery Regiment (Major Rozhkov, Pavel Ivanovich)... By order of the Supreme High Command of 13 October 1944 and a commendation in Moscow, the troops who participated in the battles for the liberation of Riga are given a salute of 24 artillery salvoes from 324 guns.

3rd Baltic Front was almost immediately disbanded, and 67th Army returned to Leningrad Front, where it would remain until peacetime, blockading the German forces trapped in the Courland Pocket.

== Postwar ==
When the shooting stopped, the men and women of the 196th shared the full title of 196th Rifle, Gatchina, Order of the Red Banner Division. (Russian: 196-я стрелковая Гатчинская Краснознамённая дивизия.) In the summer of 1945 it was transported to the Voronezh Oblast. The next year it was transferred, along with the 189th Rifle Division, to the Kiev Military District, where it was disbanded.
