= Konstantin Kulikov =

Russian major general (1896–1944)

Konstantin Yefimovich Kulikov
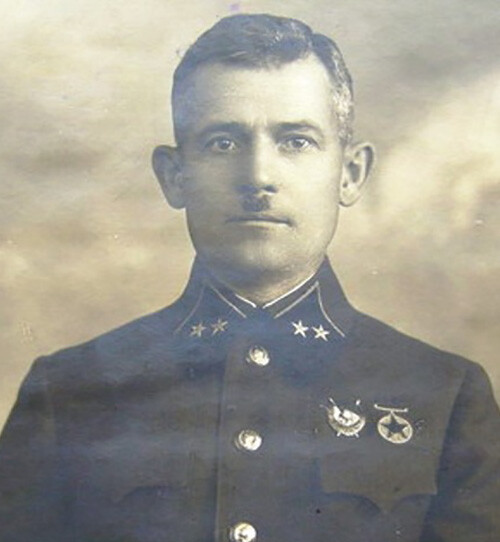
- Kulikov, c. 1940
- Born: 18 May 1896; Vitomovo, Staritsky Uyezd, Tver Governorate, Russian Empire
- Died: 30 June 1944 (aged 48); Flossenbürg concentration camp, Nazi Germany
- Military career
- Allegiance: Russian Empire; Soviet Union
- Branch: Imperial Russian Army; Red Army
- Service years: 1914–1917; 1918–1944
- Rank: General-mayor
- Commands: 39th Rifle Division; 196th Rifle Division
- Conflicts: World War I; Russian Civil War; Battle of Lake Khasan; World War II
- Awards: Order of the Red Banner

Konstantin Yefimovich Kulikov (Russian: Константин Ефимович Куликов; 18 May 1896 – 30 June 1944) was a Red Army general-mayor (major general) who held divisional command during World War II.

A veteran of World War I and the Russian Civil War, Kulikov rose through command positions in the interwar Red Army. He commanded the 39th Rifle Division during the Battle of Lake Khasan in 1938, but was relieved that year for political reasons. Just before German invaded the Soviet Union, Kulikov became commander of the 196th Rifle Division, which he led in the Battle of Kiev. Captured in the Kiev pocket, he died in Flossenbürg concentration camp.

== Early life, World War I and Russian Civil War ==
A Russian, Konstantin Yefimovich Kulikov was born in a peasant family on 18 May 1896 in the village of Vitomovo, Yemalyanovsky volost, Staritsky Uyezd, Tver Governorate. He received a fourth-grade education at the village school, and worked on his father's farm. In 1911 he began work as an apprentice roofer for a contractor in Saint Petersburg.

After World War I began, Kulikov was mobilized for military service in the Imperial Russian Army in August 1914 and sent as a ryadovoy (private) to the Novocherkassk Infantry Regiment. The next month, he volunteered to go to the front with a march battalion. On arrival, Kulikov and his battalion were absorbed into the Preobrazhensky Life Guards Regiment, positioned near Ivangorod. After graduating from the regimental training command in 1915, he received the rank of senior unter-ofitser (non-commissioned officer) in 1916, commanding a platoon. After the February Revolution, he became a member of the company and regimental committees. Kulikov was elected chief of a foot reconnaissance detachment, holding this position for the last two months of his service. Demobilized in November 1917, he returned to Petrograd (the renamed Saint Petersburg).

As the Russian Civil War began, in March 1918, Kulikov joined the Detachment of Special Purpose of the Militsiya Directorate of the Moscow Railway at the Bryansky Station. He served as chief of the detachment, responsible for fighting "counterrevolution, speculation and sabotage." Kulikov's detachment was merged into the 20th Sukhinichi Regiment during May and June, and he was appointed a squad leader in the latter. Kulikov became a member of the Communist Party that year. In October 1919, he was transferred to serve as a platoon commander in the 119th Separate Battalion in Moscow, and in December of that year sent to Ufa as a company commander in the 331st Separate Battalion. With the latter, he took part in the suppression of the Pitchfork Uprising. In December 1920, the battalion was absorbed into the 199th Rifle Regiment of the Ural Military Sector, and Kulikov appointed a battalion commander in the regiment. From May 1921 he temporarily served as assistant regimental commander.

== Interwar period ==
After the disbandment of the regiment in June 1922, Kulikov was transferred to the 1st Tatar Rifle Regiment of the 1st Kazan Rifle Division at Kazan, where he served as assistant commander and commander of a battalion. He graduated from the District Recurring Infantry Course of the Volga Military District in 1923, and was appointed assistant commander for supply units of the division's 2nd Ulyanovsk Rifle Regiment in June 1924. Kulikov completed the Vystrel course between October 1927 and August 1928. He rose to chief of supply of the division in October 1929. After completing a correspondence course offered by the 4th Department of the Frunze Military Academy, he took command of the 2nd Ulyanovsk Rifle Regiment in November 1931.

Kulikov's regiment was renumbered as the 100th Rifle Regiment and assigned to the new 34th Rifle Division, just before the relocation of the entire division to the Soviet Far East in February 1934. His regiment was stationed at Birobidzhan and Babstovo, while the division was assigned to the Special Red Banner Far Eastern Army. When the Red Army introduced personal military ranks, Kulikov became a colonel on 17 February 1936. He was appointed commander of the army's 39th Rifle Division on 10 July 1937, replacing the arrested Dmitry Firsov, and promoted to the rank of kombrig (brigade commander) on 17 February 1938. Kulikov's division was assigned to defend the Soviet border during and after the Battle of Lake Khasan from August to October 1938, but did not see action as a unit. For his performance, Kulikov was awarded the Order of the Red Banner. In December Kulikov was relieved of command due to "the existence of compromising materials and for being unable to cope with his duties," following a disagreement with political commissar Lev Mekhlis. However, he escaped arrest and was placed at the disposal of the Red Army Directorate for Command Personnel awaiting further assignment until October 1939, when he was appointed chief of the Dnepropetrovsk Rifle and Machine Gun Improvement Course for Reserve Command Personnel, responsible for training junior commanders (sergeants). Kulikov received the rank of general-mayor on 4 June 1940 when the Red Army introduced general officer ranks. As the army expanded, he was given another chance at division command, being selected to lead the Odesa Military District's new 196th Rifle Division on 14 March 1941. Kulikov's division suffered disciplinary problems, with its soldiers recorded as committing 581 offenses between 1 May and 16 June, as well as issues with lice among its soldiers. Kulikov's second wife and two children were living in Dnepropetrovsk when the war broke out.

== World War II ==
After Germany invaded the Soviet Union on 22 June, Kulikov's division was assigned to the 7th Rifle Corps of the Southern Front. It was later transferred to the 6th Army and 26th Army of the Southwestern Front, fighting in the Battle of Kiev. On 23 July the freshly arrived division was committed to the 26th Army's attack to assist the 6th and 12th Armies in the Battle of Uman. Attacking on the left flank of the 26th Army in the Boguslav region south of Kiev against the German troops in the Tarashcha region, Kulikov's division was tasked with advancing 50 kilometers and reaching Stavishche by the end of 24 July to close the gap with the 6th Army by 30 kilometers. The attack of the 227th Rifle Division to the north of the 196th stalled on the first day of the advance and it retreated in disorder, while the 196th continued to advance alone on 24 July. However, Kulikov's division was only able to move forward several kilometers to accomplish the first day's objectives, while the German III Motorized Corps relieved the German infantry opposing the 26th Army. The 26th Army was forced to go on the defensive by 25 July in the face of the III Motorized Corps' counterattack, and the 196th and neighboring divisions of the 6th Rifle Corps were compelled to retreat to the Dnieper.

26th Army commander Fyodor Kostenko critically assessed Kulikov's performance on 8 August:

General-mayor K. E. Kulikov is personally disciplined, but not demanding of his subordinates, possessing insufficient force of will. In a difficult combat situation he fails, letting control of his troops slide. He lacks firmness and steadfastness in the execution of decisions, being unable to organize battle in encirclement and bring a division out of encirclement while preserving its integrity. Thus, on 25 and 26 July 1941 in the Tarashcha region, owing to the disorganized withdrawal of troops from encirclement, little by little units and the majority of the division artillery were lost. He lacks sufficient combat experience as a division commander. Conclusion: He is appropriate for the position of division commander, but requires constant control.

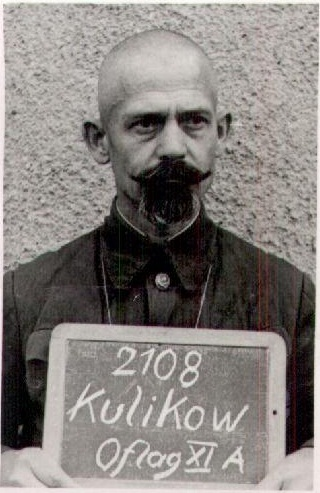
Kulikov's prisoner of war identification photograph

By 10 August, Kulikov's division was down to a strength of 6,530 officers and men from its prewar strength of 17,556. In late August, the 26th Army was forced to retreat to the left bank of the Dnieper and continued its defense south of Kiev and Zolotonosha. Kulikov's 196th and its parent army were encircled in the Kiev pocket on 15 September. The division fought on the Orzhytsia river, trying to break through the German encirclement ring and reach Lubny to unite with the Southwestern Front headquarters. Kulikov's division attempted to break through again on 21 September, and despite heavy losses was able to consolidate on the left bank of the Orzhitsa, but German artillery and mortar fire forced them to retreat again. Kulikov withdrew the remnants of the 196th towards the village of Krupoderivntsy, but 6th Rifle Corps commander Anton Lopatin demanded another attack in a different sector. Kulikov considered the remaining forces insufficient for success and went to personally report the situation to Lopatin. In his report, he explained that ordinary soldiers would not go into the attack to certain death in the face of German fire support, mentioning that the division's bayonet strength had been reduced to 1,200. Threatening with his pistol, Lopatin rejected Kulikov's reasoning and demanded continued breakthrough attempts. Returning to his division headquarters by car, Kulikov and his driver entered the German-occupied village of Sazanovka. Seeing a Soviet car, the German soldiers from the 239th Infantry Division opened fire. Kulikov abandoned his vehicle and fired back with his pistol while fleeing on foot, but was hit by a German bullet and captured.

Under interrogation, Kulikov answered questions about the mood of the officer corps and his thoughts on the political situation, criticizing political commissars as interfering with command authority. The interrogators recorded Kulikov's answer:

"It was impossible to discuss this, one could only have his own thoughts." If before, in the Tsarist army, an officer managed to escape from captivity, he received a reward. If commanders return today, then they receive, like two commanders in his division, ten years for "remaining on enemy territory," being released with a suspended sentence. "What is happening today is madness." Since he finds himself in German captivity today, he has no more hopes. He will be arrested by the Bolsheviks, so after end of the war he is threatened with conviction. If he manages to escape today, then he will suffer the same fate as two commanders of his division. He told us honestly that before 1938 he agreed with everything. But after Marshal Blyukher, whom he valued highly, and many others disappeared without a trace or were dismissed, when he himself spent eight months in Moscow without duties, he realized, "that not all is right with Soviet rule."

Initially held at the Oflag XI-A prisoner of war camp near Vladimir-Volynsky, he was transferred to the Hammelburg camp in October. Another captured Soviet general, Yevgeny Yegorov, testified postwar that Kulikov was among the signers of a late 1941 letter to the German command requesting permission to form units to fight against the Soviet Union from prisoners of war, which Yegorov characterized as a covert attempt to organize a mass escape. Yegorov added that Kulikov sought to escape in late 1942, but his intent was discovered by the Germans and he was taken away. Kulikov was transferred to the Gestapo on 12 February 1943 and that month dispatched to the Flossenbürg concentration camp, where he arrived on 23 February. Kulikov died of tuberculosis there on 30 June 1944. Soviet prisoner of war and Flossenbürg survivor Major Robert Eruste described Kulikov's death in his memoirs:

General Kulikov died in the 13th [Tuberculosis] Block and was certainly killed. He died after being given an initial injection to assist his recovery. In fact, no one was supposed to emerge alive from this block, much less a Russian general.

== Awards ==
- Order of the Red Banner (1938)
- Jubilee Medal "XX Years of the Workers' and Peasants' Red Army" (1938)
