= 7th Rifle Corps =

- Active: 1922–1946
- Country: Soviet Union
- Branch: Red Army
- Type: Infantry
- Engagements: World War II: Operation Barbarossa; Battle of Stalingrad; Leningrad-Novgorod Offensive; Battle of Berlin

The 7th Rifle Corps (7th ck) was a corps in Red Army and Soviet Armed Forces, before and during The Great Patriotic War/World War II.

== History 1st formation ==
The 11th Congress of the Russian Communist Party (Bolsheviks) adopted a resolution on the strengthening of the Red Army. It demanded to establish a strictly organized military, educational and economic conditions in the army. At the same time acknowledged burdensome for the country an army of 1,600,000 men. After the Congress, the Party Central Committee decided to reduce the Red Army at the end of 1922 to 800,000 people. Reduction of the army necessitated the restructuring of management and organizational structure of troops. The supreme military unit became a corps consisting of two or three divisions. Division consisted of three Regiments. Brigades as an independent union was abolished. In the second half of 1922 begins the construction of Rifle Corps headquarters.

By order of the Command of the Armed Forces of Ukraine and Crimea № 654/168 dated June 1, 1922, Zaporozhye in Ukrainian Military District (hereinafter UkrVO) formation of the body. In the corps entered 25th and 30th Infantry Division.

In 1923, the 80th Rifle Division joined the corps. In June 1924 the corps headquarters moved to Dnepropetrovsk. In 1925 the body was in the structure 25, 30 and 80th Rifle Division. In 1931, the body had in its composition 25, 30 and 75th Rifle Division.

On 17 May 1935, the Ukrainian Military District was divided into Kharkov and Kiev Military District. The corps became part of Kharkov Military District. On 1 July 1935, the corps included the 30th, 41st and 80th Rifle Divisions.

Corps headquarters was:

- In Zaporozhye (1 June 1922 – June 1924).
- In Dnepropetrovsk (June 1924 – September 1939).
- In Zhmerynka (September – October 1939).
- In Dnepropetrovsk (October 1939 – 1941).

On 22 June 1941, the corps was under General Major K.L. Dobroserdov, and comprised the 116th Rifle Division – Col. Ya. F. Eremenko, the 196th Rifle Division – Maj. Gen. K. E. Kulikov, and the 206th Rifle Division – Col. Sergey Gorshkov. It became part of the Southern Front on the outbreak of war. From June 22 to August 1941 the corps participated in the Soviet defence against the German Operation Barbarossa. The corps was disestablished in August 1941.

The corps was reestablished in September 1942 near Saratov. At the end of September, it was relocated to Kharabali. The corps included the 93rd, 96th and 97th Separate Rifle Brigades. From October, the division fought in the Battle of Stalingrad as part of the 64th Army. After the end of the battle, it stayed in the Stalingrad area to replenish its personnel. On 19 April 1943, it became the 35th Guards Rifle Corps for its achievements in battle.

7th Rifle Corps was reestablished again in June 1943. The corps fought in the Battle of Berlin. On 10 July 1945 the corps was part of 3rd Shock Army and comprised 146th, 265th, and 364th Rifle Divisions. The corps appears to have disbanded in July 1946.

The corps had a total of six commanders from 1941 to 1945.

== Submission ==
- Ukrainian Military District Armed Forces of Ukraine and Crimea (01.06.1922–28.08.1923)
- Ukrainian Military District Soviet Armed Forces (28.08.1923–17.05.1935)
- Kharkov Military District (17.05.1935–12.10.1939)
- Odessa Military District (12.10.1939–20.06.1940)
- 9th Army Southern Front (12.10.1939–20.06.1940)
- Odessa Military District (10.07.1940–22.6.1941)

== Commanders ==
- Alexander Bahtin (October 1922 – September 1923)
- Valentin Moulin (June 1924 - March 1931)
- Fedor Rogalyov (? – June 1937)
- Konstantin Dobroserdov, Major General (15.02.1938 – 02.08.1941).
- Major General Sergei Goryachev (6 September 1942 – 19 April 1943)
- Major General Roman Ivanovich Panin (06/17/1943 - 04.26.1944)
- Major General M.N. Ovchinnikov (04/27/1944 - 05/19/1944)
- Major General N.N. Nikishin (05/20/1944 - 08/06/1944)
- Major General A.A. Egorov (08/08/1944 - 09/27/1944)
- Major General V.A. Chistov (09/28/1944 - 04/26/1945)
- Colonel-General Yakov Cherevichenko (04/27/1945 - 05/09/1945)

== Units ==
At 1922:

- Headquarters
- Hull and units
- 25th Infantry Division
- 30th Infantry Division

At 1923:

- Headquarters
- Hull and units
- 25th Rifle Division
- 30th Rifle Division
- 80th Rifle Division

For 1931:

- Headquarters
- 7th Heavy Artillery Regiment – headquarters in Dnepropetrovsk
- 7th Communications Battalion – headquarters in Dnepropetrovsk
- 7th Combat Engineer Battalion – headquarters in Dnepropetrovsk
- 7th Hydrotechnical company – Dnepropetrovsk
- 25th Rifle Division
- 30th Rifle Division
- 75th Rifle Division
