= Pichuga =

Pichuga Пичуга
- Selo
- Location within Volgograd Oblast Location within Russia
- Coordinates: 48°59′N 44°42′E
- Country: Russia
- Region: Volgograd Oblast
- District: Dubovsky District
- Time zone: UTC+4:00

Pichuga (Russian: Пичуга) is a rural locality (a selo) and the administrative center of Pichuzhinskoye Rural Settlement, Dubovsky District, Volgograd Oblast, Russia. The population was 1,349 as of 2010. There are 39 streets.

== Geography ==
Pichuga is located on the right bank of the Volga River, 17 km southwest of Dubovka (the district's administrative centre) by road. Chelyuskinets is the nearest rural locality.
