= 392nd District Training Centre =

Military unit

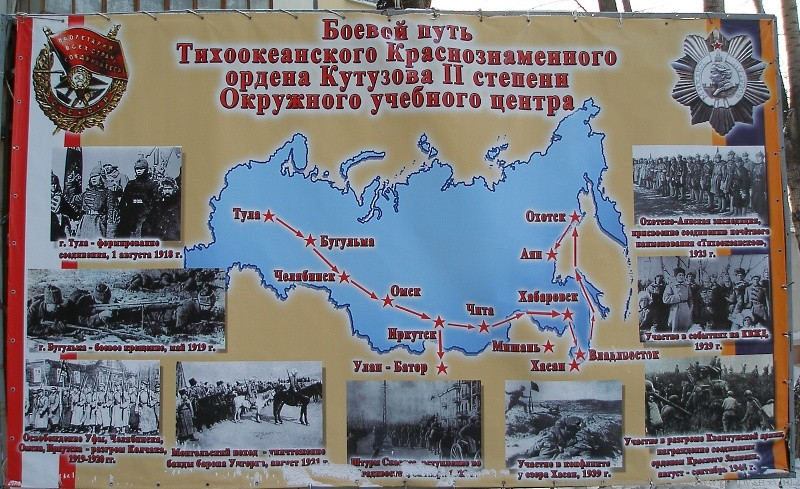
Gate sign of the 392nd District Training Centre, Khabarovsk, Khabarovsk Krai. Shows the division and its predecessor's path through the Russian Civil War and conflicts in the Far East

The 392nd Hero of the Soviet Union Marshal of the Soviet Union V. I. Petrov Pacific Red Banner Order of Kutuzov District Training Center is a training formation of the Russian Ground Forces. It is located at Knyaze-Volkonskoye in the Khabarovsk area.

It traces its lineage to the 39th Pacific Red Banner Order of Kutuzov Rifle Division (Russian: 39-я Тихоокеанская Краснознаменная стрелковая дивизия), an infantry division of the Red Army formed in 1922, which fought in the Soviet invasion of Manchuria against the Japanese in 1945, and became a motor rifle division in 1957. The division became a training unit in 1962, and became the 392nd District Training Centre in 1987. It then became part of the Russian Ground Forces after the dissolution of the Soviet Union.

== History ==
The training center traces its history back to the formation of the 1st Brigade of the 2nd Tula Infantry Division on 1 August 1918, celebrated as its anniversary. In April 1919 the division was dispatched to the Eastern Front and split up, with the 1st Rifle Brigade arriving in the Simbirsk region, where it joined the 35th Rifle Division as its 2nd Rifle Brigade. The brigade fought in the subsequent campaigns on the Eastern Front, and was renumbered as the 104th. Оn 20 July 1922, the 104th Balagansk Rifle Brigade was reorganized into the 1st Transbaikal Rifle Division of the People's Revolutionary Army of the Soviet puppet state known as the Far Eastern Republic. The division defended the border with Manchuria from its formation, and between 4 and 25 October took part in the Primorsky operation to defeat the Zemskaya Rat, the last remnants of the Whites in the Far East. During the operation, the 1st Transbaikal Rifle Division fought in the capture of Grodekovo, Nikolsk-Ussuriysky, and Vladivostok. After the end of the war, the People's Revolutionary Army was dissolved in November and the division transferred to the 5th Red Banner Army. It was based at Vladivostok. In honor of its defeat of White troops on the shores of Pacific and basing on the Pacific coast, the division was redesignated the 1st Pacific Rifle Division (Russian: 1-я Тихоокеанская стрелковая дивизия) on 22 November 1922. After the 5th Army was disbanded, the division shifted to the 19th Rifle Corps of the Siberian Military District in June 1929. In August 1929 it was transferred to the Special Far Eastern Army, taking part in the border conflict with China over the Chinese Eastern Railway.

The division fought the Chinese during the Sino-Soviet conflict (1929).

In 1936, the division was renumbered as the 39th Pacific Rifle Division. During the Battle of Lake Khasan, the division was assigned to the new 39th Rifle Corps in August 1938. The main forces of the division were concentrated near the battlefield and held defenses in the region of Malaya, Tigrovaya and Sangal hills. The 1st Battalion of its 115th Chita Rifle Regiment, placed under the control of the 40th Rifle Division commander, defended the Zaozernaya and Bezymyannaya (Nameless) Hills against Japanese attacks.

After the end of the battle, the division returned to its barracks in the 2-ya rechka district of Vladivostok and nearby Shkotovo.

39th RD comprised the 50th, 199th, and 254th Rifle, 15th Artillery Regiments and other smaller sub-units. The division remained in the Far East during World War II, part of 1st Red Banner Army's 59th Rifle Corps for the duration of the war. On 29 June 1941 the division was moved forward to the border with Japanese-controlled Manchuria, where it was based as follows:

- 50th Rifle Regiment in the region of Vinokurka mountain
- 199th Rifle Regiment in the region of the village of Turiy-Rog, Pavlov hill, kolkhoz imeni Kirova
- 254th Rifle Regiment and 15th Light Artillery Regiment in the region of Hill 305.6

The 39th fought in the Soviet invasion of Manchuria from 9 August to 3 September 1945 and was awarded the Order of the Red Banner for its actions. The division was with the 59th Rifle Corps, 1st Red Banner Army in the Transbaikal-Amur Military District in 1945.

The division became the 129th Motor Rifle Division on 17 May 1957, and on 29 March 1960, it became the 129th Training Motor Rifle Division.

The division was reorganized as the 392nd District Training Centre of the Far Eastern Military District on 14 September 1987.

Between 1996 and 2006, General Nikolay Bogdanovsky was the Chief of the 392nd Pacific Center for Training Junior Specialists of Motorized Rifle Forces, and the Chief of Staff and Commander of the 35th Army.

On 22 August 2002, Korea Central News Agency, a North Korean state media outlet, reported that Kim Jong-il, Chair of the DPRK National Defence Commission, visited Kharbarovsk. Among his visits was the "Volochayev division," where he was welcomed by the Far East Military District commander and deputy commander, Generals Yakubov and Kolmakov, and "Divisional Commander A.P. Chechebatov." General Major A.V. Chechevatov was commanding the 392nd District Training Center at the time.

As a result of military reforms, the center was reorganized as the 392nd Inter-Branch Training Center of the Eastern Military District on 1 September 2012, including the 212th District Training Center at Chita, the 392nd District Training Center at Khabarovsk, and the 51st Submarine Training Detachment of the Pacific Fleet at Vladivostok. The inter-branch organization was disbanded on 1 May 2013 and the 392nd District Training Center created at Knyaze-Volkonskoye. The training center was named in honor of its commander between 1957 and 1961, the future Marshal Vasily Petrov, on 15 March 2019, its full official designation changing to the 392nd Hero of the Soviet Union Marshal V. I. Petrov Pacific Red Banner Order of Kutuzov District Training Center.

== Commanders ==
The following have commanded the unit:

- Aleksey Aleksandrovich Glazkov (20 July 1922–June 1923)
- Semyon Vasilyevich Nikitin (June 1923–July 1929)
- Aleksandr Cherepanov (1929–October 1933)
- Dmitry Sergeyevich Firsov (November 1933–arrested 31 May 1937)
- Konstantin Yefimovich Kulikov (10 July 1937–relieved December 1938)
- Anatoly Markianovich Morozov (1939–20 July 1940)
- Major General Vladimir Stepanovich Kuznetsov (20 July 1940–19 November 1941)
- Colonel Nikolay Mikhailovich Sukharev (20 November 1941–22 November 1944, major general 7 December 1942)
- Colonel Dmitry Vasilyevich Makarov (23 November 1944–3 August 1945)
- Major General Vasily Aleksandrovich Semyonov (3 August–December 1945)
- Major General Viktor Vasilyevich Arkhangelsky (December 1945–11 March 1946)
- Major General Luka Basanets (11 March 1946–8 June 1949)
- Major General Ivan Kalyuzhny (8 June 1949–6 May 1952)
- Major General Ivan Agapovich Teplyakov (6 May 1952–September 1954)
- Major General Serafim Andrianovich Krasnovsky (September 1954–21 May 1955)
- Major General Dmitry Ivanovich Koltsov (21 May 1955–8 January 1957)
- Colonel Vasily Ivanovich Petrov (8 January 1957–22 July 1961, major general 9 May 1961)
- Colonel Nikolay Ilyich Tarakanov (22 July 1961–11 March 1965, major general 22 February 1963)
- Colonel Yury Fyodorovich Zanudin (11 March 1965–25 April 1967, major general 16 June 1965)
- Colonel Vasily Fyodorovich Bukharenko (25 April 1967–25 April 1970, major general 19 February 1968)
- Colonel Aleksey Grigoryevich Goncharenko (25 April 1970–15 May 1973, major general 29 April 1970)
- Colonel Grigory Mikhailovich Boyarov (15 May 1973–1976, major general 28 October 1976)
- Major General Vasily Vasilyevich Polunin (1976–1980)
- Major General Sergey Pavlovich Seleznyov (1980–1982)
- Major General Mars Tairovich Umerov (1982–1985)
- Major General Aleksandr Sergeyevich Rukshin (1985–1988)
- Major General Valery Petrovich Ageyev (1988–1993)
- Major General Yevgeny Nikolayevich Churayev (1993–1995)
- Major General Aleksandr Postnikov-Streltsov (1995–1998)
- Major General Nikolay Bogdanovsky (1998–2000)
- Major General Vladimir Andreyevich Abramov (2000–2002)
- Major General Andrey Viktorovich Chechevatov (2002–2005)
- Major General Sergey Alekseyevich Romanenko (2005–2006)
- Colonel Sergey Mikhailovich Sevryukov (2006–2009)
- Colonel Vladimir Nikolayevich Lugovoy (2009–2012)
- Colonel Andrey Anatolyevich Serditsky (2012–2013)
- General-major Andrey Ivanayev (2013–2014)
- General-major Aleksandr Valentinovich Glazkov (2014–2016)
- Colonel Aleksey Vladimirovich Podvilov (2016–2017)
- Colonel Gennady Vilyamovich Shevchenko (2017–2018)
- Major General Valery Vitalyevich Shkilnyuk (2018–2020)
- Colonel Sergey Ivanovich Storozhenko (2020–2021)
- Major General Sergey Goryachev (2021–2022)
- Colonel Azatbek Omurbekov (29 December 2022–present)
