= Orlovka (station), Volgograd Oblast =

Orlovka Орловка
- Station
- Location within Volgograd Oblast Location within Russia
- Coordinates: 48°51′N 44°34′E
- Country: Russia
- Region: Volgograd Oblast
- District: Gorodishchensky District
- Time zone: UTC+4:00

Orlovka (Russian: Орловка) is a rural locality (a station) in Orlovskoye Rural Settlement, Gorodishchensky District, Volgograd Oblast, Russia. The population was 102 as of 2010. There are 3 streets.

== Geography ==
Orlovka is located in steppe, 13 km northeast from Gorodishche (the district's administrative centre) by road. Orlovka is the nearest rural locality.
