= Biryukov =

Biryukov (Russian: Бирюков) and Biryukova (Russian: Бирюкова; feminine) is a common Russian surname derived from the word "бирюк" (lone wolf).

People with this surname include:

- Alex Biryukov, cryptographer
- Vladimir Pavlovich Biryukov (1888–1971), folklorist
- Vladimir Afanasyevich Biryukov (1933–2021), Russian politician
- Igors Birjukovs (born 1986), Latvian hockey player
- Mikhail Biryukov (disambiguation), several people
- Vladislav Biryukov, (born 1972), Russian mineralogist and journalist
- Yury Biryukov (composer) (1908–1976), Soviet Russian composer.
- Yury Biryukov (artist) (1940–2011), Ukrainian artist, author emblem of Zhytomyr
- Yury Biryukov (born 1948), Russian lawyer and politician
- Yury Biryukov (volunteer) (born 1974) Ukrainian volunteer, founder of "Wings Phoenix"
- Anna Biryukova (born 1967), Soviet and Russian triple jumper
- Svetlana Biryukova (born 1991), Russian long jumper
- Vera Biryukova (born 1998), Russian rhythmic gymnast and 2016 Olympic gold medalist
- Nikolai Biryukov (1901–1980), Soviet general
- Anatoly Biryukov (fl. 1977), Soviet serial killer
- Denis Biryukov (born 1988), Russian volleyball player

== See also ==
- Biryukov is also the name of several rural localities in Russia
