= 186th Rifle Division (1939 formation) =

186th Rifle Division (August 19, 1939 - June 1946)
- Active: 1939–1946
- Country: Soviet Union
- Branch: Red Army
- Type: Infantry
- Size: Division
- Engagements: Operation Barbarossa; Battle of Smolensk (1941); Battles of Rzhev; Operation Mars; Operation Kutuzov; Battle of Smolensk (1943); Gomel-Rechytsa offensive Novy Bykhaw-Propoysk offensive Rahachow-Zhlobin offensive Operation Bagration; Bobruysk offensive Lublin–Brest offensive Vistula–Oder offensive East Pomeranian offensive Battle of Berlin
- Decorations: Order of the Red Banner; Order of Suvorov; Order of Kutuzov
- Battle honours: Brest

Commanders
- Notable commanders: Maj. Gen. Nikolai Ivanovich Biryukov; Maj. Gen. Aleksei Ivanovich Zygin; Lt. Col. Mikhail Ivanovich Nikitin; Maj. Gen. Viktor Kazimirovich Urbanovich; Maj. Gen. Grigorii Vasilevich Revunenkov; Col. Semyon Savvich Velichko

The original 186th Rifle Division was an infantry division of the Red Army, formed just before the start of the Second World War, in the Ural Military District, based on the pre-September 13, 1939 shtat (table of organization and equipment). At the outbreak of war with Germany in June 1941 it was already moving west, and was soon assigned to the 22nd Army, which became part of Western Front on July 1. After the disastrous frontier battles this Front was attempting to defend along the lines of the Dvina and Dniepr Rivers, with the 22nd on the far right (north) flank. The division was initially quite successful in holding prepared positions near Polotsk, but was outflanked by German crossings elsewhere along the Dvina and forced to retreat. It became encircled west of Nevel, but was able to escape when Velikiye Luki was retaken on July 21. It held positions east of this city into late August when it was struck by a surprise panzer assault and largely overrun, which soon led to Velikiye Luki changing hands again. As the damaged division retreated in late September a former militia division in the far north was assigned the same number, and this anomaly persisted into late June 1943, when the later division was redesignated. The 186th, now in Kalinin Front, took part in the winter counteroffensive which drove a huge salient into the German lines around Toropets, and created the Rzhev salient. By February 1942 the offensive had bogged down, and the following months saw attacks and counterattacks on the west side of the salient, during which the division was fortunate to escape encirclement. Prior to Operation Mars it was transferred to 39th Army, but it played only a minor role in that offensive, and was moved in March 1943 to the reserve near Moscow for rebuilding. When it returned to the fighting front in late April it joined 25th Rifle Corps under direct command of Bryansk Front. After Operation Kutuzov began this Corps came under command of 3rd Army to serve as an exploitation force. By the first week of August the 186th had fought forward to take part in the liberation of Oryol, after which it advanced through eastern Ukraine and into Belarus. During the fall and winter of 1943/44 the division fought in a series of offensives in eastern Belarus under command of Belorussian (later 1st Belorussian) Front, gradually closing in on the Dniepr. It was along this line at the start of the 1944 summer offensive and soon began advancing against the routed forces of Army Group Center, taking part in the capture of Babruysk and winning the Order of the Red Banner before continuing to drive westward. During this drive the division took part in the liberation of Brest, and was awarded its name as a battle honor. It was now in the 46th Rifle Corps of 65th Army, and it would remain under these commands into the postwar, moving to 2nd Belorussian Front in November. In September it forced crossings over the Narew River before the offensive was finally shut down. During the first phase of the Vistula-Oder offensive the 186th attacked out of the Serock bridgehead in the direction of Mława and Płońsk and two of its regiments were recognized for their roles in the fighting for these towns. Further awards followed for the division's role in the battle for Danzig in March. Beginning on April 18 it fought its way across both branches of the lower Oder River before advancing to the northwest. It took part in the fighting around Stettin, and in its final actions cleared the island of Rügen. After the war it was pulled back into Poland, where it was disbanded in June 1946.

== Formation ==
The division began forming on August 19, 1939, at Ufa in the Ural Military District. It was based on the 4th Separate Bashkir Rifle Regiment. As of June 22, 1941, it had the following order of battle:

- 238th Rifle Regiment (until June 1, 1942)
- 234th Rifle Regiment (from April 10, 1942)
- 238th Rifle Regiment (from June 1, 1942)
- 290th Rifle Regiment
- 298th Rifle Regiment (later 879th, 653rd)
- 327th Artillery Regiment
- 227th Antitank Battalion (later 327th)
- 508th Antiaircraft Battery (later 264th Antiaircraft Battalion, until March 9, 1943)
- 465th Machine Gun Battalion (from October 1, 1942, until March 9, 1943)
- 107th Reconnaissance Company
- 255th Sapper Battalion
- 244th Signal Battalion (later 574th Signal Company)
- 167th Medical/Sanitation Battalion
- 133rd Chemical Defense (Anti-gas) Company (later 111th)
- 38th Motor Transport Company (later 164th)
- 296th Motorized Field Bakery (later 42nd, 35th)
- 92nd Divisional Veterinary Hospital
- 406th Field Postal Station (later 1483rd)
- 138th Field Office of the State Bank

Col. Nikolai Ivanovich Biryukov took command on the day the division began forming. He had previously led the 219th Rifle Regiment and had served in Spain during the Spanish Civil War. He would be promoted to the rank of Kombrig on November 4, and this would be modernized to that of major general on June 4, 1940.

At the start of the German invasion on June 22, 1941, the 186th was under command of the 62nd Rifle Corps of 22nd Army in the Reserve of the Supreme High Command. It had been moving west by rail from the Urals for over a week and was now located near Idritsa, not far from the former USSR/Latvia border. It became part of the Active Army on June 29.

== Battle of Smolensk ==
On July 1 Marshal S. K. Timoshenko took command of Western Front, and the 22nd Army was one of four reserve armies assigned to it on the same date. It was under command of Lt. Gen. F. A. Yershakov. Timoshenko's immediate aim was to defend the "Smolensk Gates" along the lines of the Dvina and Dniepr Rivers, and the 22nd was initially assigned a sector from Idritsa to Polotsk. 62nd Corps also contained the 174th and 179th Rifle Divisions. Due to the chaos produced by the German advance, only 37 of Timoshenko's 66 divisions managed to reach their assigned defensive positions before the advancing forces reached the two rivers. The 3rd Panzer Group was leading this advance on the Polotsk axis.

62nd Corps was specifically assigned to defend the Polotsk Fortified Region. Army Group Center resumed its advance on July 2. The LVII Motorized Corps led the way in the Polotsk direction, and was to advance north of Smolensk after passing the Dvina, but unexpectedly encountered 22nd Army's prepared defenses along the river. On July 4 the 19th Panzer Division managed to seize a bridgehead from 51st Rifle Corps at Disna, but 62nd Corps stymied the 18th Motorized Division opposite Polotsk. By late on July 5 the 3rd Panzer Group was in a bind, unable to advance anywhere. 62nd Corps had been moved to Ulla, 56 km west of Vitebsk, where it was now blocking the XXXIX Motorized Corps. Timoshenko now planned a counterstroke at Lyepyel, relying on new mechanized forces from Moscow, but 62nd Corps was ordered to maintain its defensive stance.

Despite this partly-successful counterstroke, 3rd Panzer Group penetrated the defenses of 22nd Army south of Polotsk on July 9 and captured Vitebsk by the end of the day. After a regrouping, the 20th Panzer Division, backed by the 20th Motorized Division, struck again at Ulla on July 10. With massive air support the panzer division rolled across the Dvina through 22nd Army and drove 55 km northeast to Haradok. Timoshenko was left with no option but to begin to fight a rear-guard action. At the same time he ordered the 186th, along with other forces, to counterattack to seal the breach.

In his report to the STAVKA at 2000 hours on July 11, Timoshenko stated, in part:

186th RD - 238th Regiment is attacking toward Lovsha Station, with its forward units fighting in the vicinity of Lovsha Station and its remaining units concentrated in the Prudok and Bobrovshchina region (14 kilometres east of Trudy).

3rd Panzer Group was soon on the move and by nightfall on July 13 its spearhead, the 7th Panzer Division, was probing toward Nevel and Velizh with the intention of linking up with 2nd Panzer Group east of Smolensk. Timoshenko had issued orders late on July 12 for General Yershakov to carry out a counterattack the following morning with the 186th and 214th Rifle Divisions and supporting artillery from the Haradok area south toward Vitebsk. This plan was stillborn when LVII Motorized Corps, backed by the L and XXIII Army Corps drove the Army from its remaining defenses along the Dvina northwest of Polotsk, cut it into two parts, enveloped its flanks and threatened both parts with encirclement. With only six divisions to defend a front 274 km wide Yershakov was soon in full retreat as the panzers drove northward toward Nevel.

=== Breakout from Encirclement ===
Nevel was taken by LVII Motorized on the morning of July 16 which left four of 22nd Army's divisions (50th, 174th, 186th and 214th) cut off and isolated between that town and Vitebsk. As the German commanders debated the size of the encircled forces and exactly how best to deal with them while also carrying out their other objectives, the four divisions did their best to escape in the general direction of Velikiye Luki, aided by the difficult terrain in the region. On July 18 the 19th Panzers captured the city but overnight elements of 22nd Army attacked and overran the thin screen being held around Nevel by 14th Motorized Division, allowing encircled 62nd Corps to escape to the east. This pressure also forced 19th Panzer to abandon the city on July 21 and Yershakov triumphantly signalled the commander of 62nd Corps:

We have captured Velikiye Luki. 29th Rifle Corps (179th and 214th Rifle Divisions) are attacking toward Nevel to destroy the enemy and support your withdrawal... An automobile [truck] column (50 vehicles) with ammunition, fuel, and food is being sent to you in the Zui region [35km south of Velikiye Luki]... assemble your corps after the automobile column arrives from Toropets...

This overlooked victory was the first large city liberated by the Red Army for any length of time. The 186th managed to reach friendly lines on July 21 and two days later was defending the Shchukino–Poreche–Lake Serutskoe line with the 174th Division, while also assisting 19th Army's 134th Rifle Division in escaping from encirclement. Yershakov now attempted to create a new defense line along the Lovat River although his 51st Rifle Corps had been reduced to remnants.

By July 27 Yershakov had reorganized his defenses along the Lovat with the mission of "holding on to Velikiye Luki at all cost." Maj. Gen. I. P. Karmanov, commander of 62nd Corps, was to support 29th Corps in this, in part by preventing a German penetration or envelopment of General Biryukov's left flank. However, due to other priorities, the German 9th Army did not make any further moves over the coming weeks. When the advance was renewed on August 3 the 186th was reported as holding its positions. In an operational summary by Western Front issued at 2000 hours on August 21, 22nd Army was reported as counterattacking, with 62nd Corps' 186th and 174th Divisions advancing from a position 35–38 km southwest of Velikiye Luki and gaining up to 3 km against strong resistance. The next day the same source stated that the 186th had been attacked at 0600 by the 110th Infantry Division, which captured Bardino, Sopki, and Dreki, "and enemy sub-machine gunners penetrated into Slonovo, but measures are being taken to liquidate the enemy penetration." This presaged a larger drive on August 23 by panzer forces that had "disappeared" from Soviet view four days earlier.

=== Second Battle for Velikiye Luki ===
Western Front's summary at 2000 hours said that, after the 186th's sector had been penetrated the previous day, a larger German force, including tanks, had:

... "rushed" toward the north and northwest, seizing Velikopol'e Station and Ushitsy State Farm [15km east and southeast of Velikiye Luki, respectively] on the morning of 23 August and reaching Kun'ia and Ushitsy Stations [25-27km east of Velikiye Luki] with the advanced elements of two motorized columns (150 vehicles each) by 1200 hours on 23 August.

Yershakov was scrambling to respond while being forced to move his headquarters. The next day, the summary identified the 19th and 20th Panzer Divisions as well as a panzer brigade and 206th Infantry Division, and that a captured order indicated that their objective was to encircle 22nd Army. The situation on 62nd Corps left flank (essentially the 186th) was said to be "unclear"; Yershakov had sent most of the 98th Rifle Division to support the 186th, but both had been effectively smashed by the attack and the 174th Division was forced to flee to the northeast. These German moves were in response to Hitler's decision on August 21 to move 3rd Panzer Group northeast to assist Army Group North's stalled advance on Leningrad. Later on August 23 the two panzer divisions made a headlong assault of Velikiye Luki from the east, while the 110th, 102nd, and 256th Infantry Divisions attempted to liquidate the remnants of 62nd Corps while also pushing into the rear of 29th Army and the objective of Toropets. Timoshenko, unaware of the full scope of the disaster, ordered Yershakov:

... to hold on to your front. The commander of 62nd RC and the commander of 186th RD are personally responsible for closing the penetration. Employ all your forces and your attached aircraft to destroy the penetrating enemy on 23 and 24 August.

29th Army scrambled to protect its flank. On August 24 the 110th and part of the 102nd Infantry Divisions encircled and destroyed most of the 186th and 174th southeast of Kunia Station. Late in the day the rear elements of the 186th were reported as reaching Toropets in disorder. Overnight, up to 20,000 men of the main body of 22nd Army (29th and 51st Corps) managed to escape the pocket around Velikiye Luki, while another 25,000 fought on until death or capture. The city was retaken on August 25.

=== Fall of Toropets ===
On August 26 the deputy chief of staff of Western Front, Lt. Gen. G. K. Malandin, was sent to 22nd Army's headquarters at Podsosone, 15 km southeast of Toropets to assess the situation. Near midnight he reported to his superior, Lt. Gen. V. D. Sokolovskii, that the 186th was at 30-40 percent strength but "needs to have order restored." It was assigned a sector in the former forward line, along with a unit called Latkin's Detachment. In the absence of Yershakov, who was cut off from his headquarters, Malandin did his best to organize a defense of Toropets. The 186th was again facing the 102nd Infantry, which was now assigned to XXXX Motorized Corps. On August 27 this Corps resumed its advance eastward.

Malandin's report implicitly admitted that it was most unlikely that 22nd and 29th Armies would be able to defend either Staraya Toropa or Toropets. Nevertheless, at 2300 hours on August 28 the division was assigned the task, along with the Latkin Detachment, to seize and defend the Tarasy and Fedotkovo sector, 38 km west-southwest of Toropets. Due to the advance of XXXX Corps these orders were hopelessly out-of-date and the city was taken in the morning of August 29. Meanwhile, the LVII Corps advanced easily and split the defenses of 22nd Army, and both German corps continued their advance on Andreapol and Zapadnaya Dvina on August 30. On the same day, Timoshenko sent a message to Stalin addressing the situation in the 22nd Army's sector. He stated that the 186th was fighting in the western and northeastern outskirts of Toropets, but he also stated that General Biryukov was being turned over to a military tribunal for wilfully abandoning his positions. In the event this was not carried out. By the end of the month the 186th consisted of roughly 2,000 personnel, with three 76mm cannon, two 45mm antitank guns, and two 122mm howitzers left from its entire artillery park.

On September 1, Timoshenko again attempted to go over to the counteroffensive, aiming at Dukhovshchina with his main forces, but 22nd and 29th Armies were in no position to take part. Two days later, the 186th was reported as "fighting with enemy forces which have penetrated into the Suvorovo and Ivanova Gora region" some 18 km south of Andreapol. A further report the next day stated:

126th and 186th RDs - repelled fierce enemy counterattacks at Ivanova Gora, with the town changing hands three times, but 186th Division recaptured the Ivanova Gora and Suvorovo region at 1200 hours on 4 September.

An operational summary from Western Front at 2000 on September 5 indicated that the counteroffensive was effectively finished; the two divisions, along with a unit called Antosenko's Detachment, were said to have attacked for a second time from woods 2 km east of Suvorovo to Hill 236.2 to Frolovo to the Yaldy line (17–22 km south of Andreapol) with "unknown results". General Biryukov was wounded and hospitalized on September 12, being replaced by Col. Anton Petrovich Pilipenko. Biryukov returned to lead the 214th Rifle and 80th Guards Rifle Divisions, and later the 20th Guards Rifle Corps, before the end of the war. He would be made a Hero of the Soviet Union on April 28, 1945, for his leadership in the siege of Budapest, and was also promoted to the rank of lieutenant general. He died in Moscow on June 30, 1980.

In the far north, Karelian Front had formed a militia (opolchenie) division called 1st Polar (Polyarnaya) on September 5 to serve in the defense of Murmansk. On September 28 it was decided to regularize the division by giving it the number '186th'. No explanation has been publicly shared as to why the division was given the number of a division that had not been disbanded. Not only did the two divisions share the same number, most of their subunits did as well, which explains the several redesignations of the original division's regiments as seen above. This anomalous situation continued until June 26, 1943, when the second 186th was redesignated as the 205th Rifle Division.

=== Transfer to Kalinin Front ===
By the beginning of October the 62nd Corps had been disbanded, and the 186th was under direct command of 22nd Army, as it fell back toward the Valdai Hills. The Army's four remaining divisions continued to arrive along the line Ostashkov–Selizharovo–Kamenitsa–Plekhanovo during October 9. On October 19 it came under command of the new Kalinin Front, led by Col. Gen. I. S. Konev. Later in the month the weather deteriorated, slowing the pursuit of the defeated 22nd. On October 24, elements of 9th Army were pushing it north, advancing in small groups toward Lukovnikovo against the remnants of the 186th, 179th, and 250th Rifle Divisions. The next day, Colonel Pilipenko was transferred to the staff of 22nd Army, and he was replaced by Maj. Gen. Aleksei Ivanovich Zygin. This officer had previously led the 174th Rifle Division.

== Moscow Counteroffensive ==
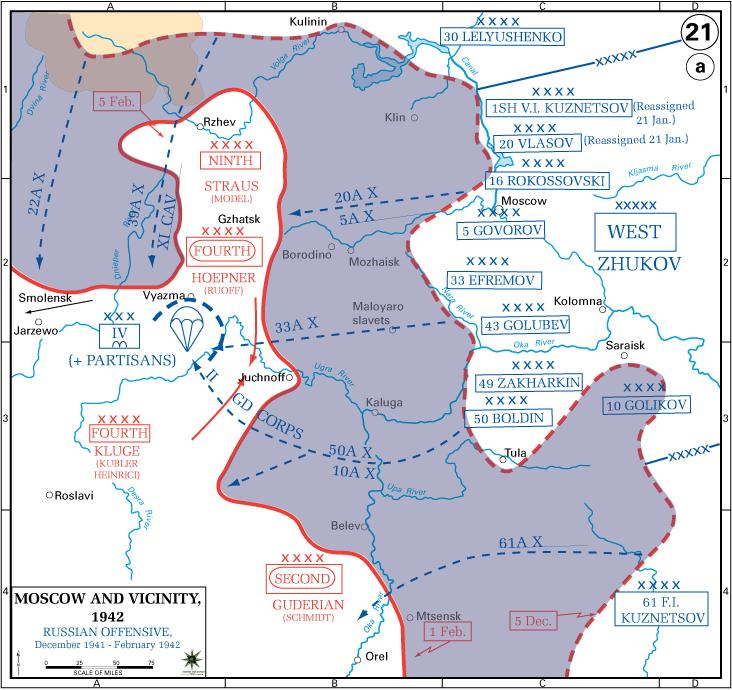
Moscow counteroffensive. Note advance of 22nd Army on the far left.

At the start of 1942 the 22nd Army consisted of the 178th, 179th, 186th, and 357th Rifle Divisions, plus one regiment of the 220th Rifle Division and the 129th Tank Brigade. Despite these scant and understrength forces, it went over to the offensive on January 15, now under command of Maj. Gen. V. I. Vostrukhov, and drove 120 km to the south and southeast, deeply enveloping the German grouping at Olenino, which consisted of seven divisions. Air transport was required to keep them in supply, while part of 22nd Army advanced on Bely. In cooperation with forces of 39th Army the German Bely grouping was compressed along the Bely–Dukhovshchina road, where it set up a firm defense. On January 16 the 4th Shock Army retook Andreapol, and five days later cleared Toropets, creating a huge salient to the west of 9th Army.

== Battles for Rzhev ==
The second phase of the Rzhev-Vyazma operation began at the start of February, when German forces launched counterstrokes in all the main directions of the Soviet operations. The Soviet armies were significantly weakened from casualties and were mostly operating on very tenuous supply lines. All efforts to liberate Vyazma had failed. On February 5, most of Kalinin Front's 29th Army was cut off from 39th Army and encircled. After several attempts to rejoin with 39th, by mid-month it was decided to regroup to join hands with 22nd Army. By the end of February only 5,200 personnel had managed to escape. Meanwhile, the 22nd was attempting to finally seize Bely as a preliminary to eliminating the German Olenino grouping, but this was unsuccessful. At the same time, General Zygin left the 186th, being replaced by Maj. Mikhail Ivanovich Nikitin. Within days, Zygin would take command of the 158th Rifle Division, and would subsequently lead four different armies, including the 39th during Operation Mars, before being killed in action on September 27, 1943. Nikitin would be promoted to the rank of lieutenant colonel on May 19.

On March 20 the STAVKA again demanded that Kalinin Front finish off the Olenino grouping with the 22nd, 39th, and 30th Armies. This made no progress due to the general exhaustion of the troops. For example, 22nd Army had, in terms of numbers, since the start of the counteroffensive in January had lost its entire complement twice over. Replacements were largely untrained and ammunition was in short supply. In addition, the spring rasputitsa was about to begin. A further offensive plan issued on May 24 called for the same objective to be attained, but this was largely preempted by the German Operation Seydlitz beginning on July 2. On July 6 the right flank of the Army had been encircled, but this did not include the 186th. The remainder of the Army, in cooperation with 41st Army, attempted to reopen the corridor to the encircled units. The following day, German forces reached Bely from Sychyovka and trapped most of 39th Army. Seydlitz officially finished on July 13, but individuals and groups continued to emerge from encirclement even into August, aided by attacks from outside the several pockets. 22nd Army suffered 9,343 casualties, including 3,905 missing.

=== Operation Mars ===
Lt. Colonel Nikitin left his command on August 30, and the following day was replaced by Maj. Gen. Viktor Kazimirovich Urbanovich. This NKVD officer had previously led the 257th and 252nd Rifle Divisions. In October the 186th was transferred to 39th Army, still in Kalinin Front.

The Second Rzhev-Sychyovka Offensive (Operation Mars) got underway on November 25. 39th Army was spread across an exceedingly long front along the north end of the salient. General Zygin's immediate task was to cross the Molodoi Tud River before driving south toward Olenino. The 186th was arrayed along the river's upper reaches west and somewhat south of the village of Molodoi Tud itself, but was expected to remain on the defense. The one-hour artillery bombardment began at 0900 hours against the long front held by the 206th Infantry Division, which had adopted a hedgehog defense. The attack came to a standstill by noon due to heavy German fire.

One of two successes in the morning's fighting occurred between the village and the small tributary Dubenka River. With the support of the 290th Rifle Regiment, the 100th Rifle Brigade forced the Molodoi Tud River at dawn. The brigade overcame sparse defenses at the boundary of the 253rd and 206th Infantry Divisions, and then penetrated 5 km through the forests north of the Dubenka almost to the Molodoi Tud–Olenino road. Scattered positions held by units of both divisions managed to contain the brigade, knowing that if the road was cut the German defenses along the Molodoi Tud River would become untenable. In the event, by 1800 reinforcements arrived in the form of the Großdeutschland Motorized Division, which shut down any further Soviet advance.

Early on November 26 Zygin learned that the 100th Brigade was under heavy attack and in danger of losing its gains. German tanks and infantry struck the brigade's south flank north of the Dubenka and pressed on toward the Molodoi Tud, threatening it with encirclement. To the east, another mobile force raced north to strike its north flank. Despite being reinforced by a single rifle battalion of the 290th Regiment shortly before nightfall it was clear any new attacks the next morning could not be held. Nevertheless, Zygin ordered it to fight on in place. In the event, the 3rd and 4th Battalions of the Grenadier Regiment of Großdeutschland caught the brigade in a pincer move that routed it and sent the survivors reeling back across the Molodoi Tud, whereupon the German forces reoccupied their original defense line. This marked the effective end of the 186th's involvement in the operation.

At the start of March 1943 the 186th was still part of the much-reduced 39th Army, and it took part in the initial phases of Operation Büffel as German 9th Army evacuated the Rzhev salient. On March 9 it was removed to the Moscow Military District in the Reserve of the Supreme High Command for a much-needed rebuilding. On April 30 it was reassigned to 25th Rifle Corps in Bryansk Front. At the beginning of July the Corps was still under direct Front command.

== Operation Kutuzov ==
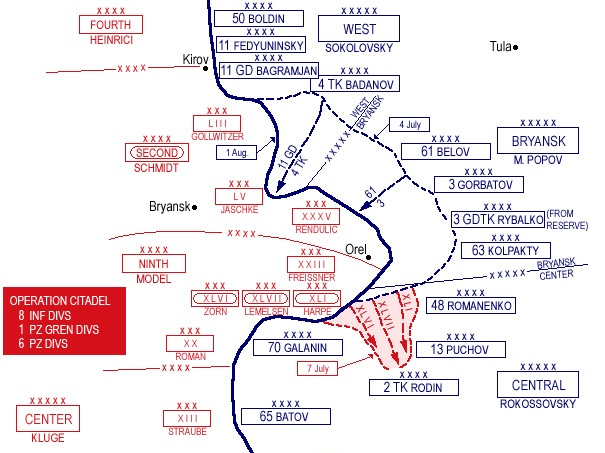
Map of Operation Kutuzov. Note position of 3rd Army.

General Urbanovich left the division on July 3. Within weeks he would be given command of the 41st Rifle Corps, which he would command into the postwar. He was replaced by Col. Nikolai Prokhorovich Yatskevich, who had been in command of the 298th Rifle Regiment.

By the start of the Soviet summer offensive the 25th Corps (186th and 362nd Rifle Divisions) was still in the Front reserve in the area of Chern–Pashutino–Speshnevo, but was intended to act as the follow-on force for 3rd Army. The Army was under command of Lt. Gen. A. V. Gorbatov. On the first day of the offensive it was to break through the German defense to a depth of 10–12 km and on the third day reach the line of the Oka River, cutting the Mtsensk–Oryol paved road and railroad.

The operation began on July 12, but during the first five days the 25th Corps remained in second echelon. During this time the Front's left wing forces had penetrated the German lines to a depth of 17–22 km on a breakthrough front of 36 km. The offensive was renewed on July 17 in order to break through the defense along the Oleshnya River. 9th Army had thrown in significant reserves, including the 2nd and 8th Panzer Divisions, plus the 36th Infantry and 12th Antiaircraft Divisions, to defend along this line. 25th Corps was tasked with attacking along the line from Panama to Aleksandrovka in the direction of Kobyakovo, height 260.0, and Kruglitsa. After piercing the Oleshnya line it was to reach the Yadrino–Dobrovody–Protasovo line by the end of the day.

25th Corps had the direct support of the 253rd and 82nd Tank and 1538th Self-Propelled Artillery Regiments (the latter equipped with SU-152s). It attacked through the positions of the 308th Rifle Division. 1st Guards Tank Corps had been concentrated overnight, ready to be committed to the expected breach. At dawn the German Air Force launched powerful raids against 25th Corps in its jumping-off positions. Despite this, the attack began at 1130 hours following a 10-minute artillery and aviation onslaught. It made initial progress, reaching the eastern outskirts of Arsenevo, the road junction 1,000m east of Kobyakovo, and height 247.4 by noon. However, through the rest of the day the Corps faced heavy counterattacks and airstrikes. Before 1400 a battalion of infantry, with tanks, and as much as a regiment of infantry from another direction, struck elements of the 186th which were forced to abandon the height and fall back 200-300m to the east. 1st Guards Tanks entered the initial breach but was attacked by a large number of panzers west of Aleksandrovka and, after taking losses, fell back on its infantry. The counterattacks continued the next day. At 0500 two battalions, supported by 20 tanks, hit the division again near height 247.4, and at 1020 another battalion attacked from the Bortnoe area, but this was scattered by artillery fire.

The commander of the Front, Col. Gen. M. M. Popov, decided to accelerate the offensive by committing his reserve 3rd Guards Tank Army. To this end, the 3rd Army was to launch a new attack on the morning of July 19 on the Arsenovo–Aleksandrovka sector. This was to be supported by the 15th and 20th Artillery Divisions, plus all the artillery of 3rd Guards Tanks. During July 18 concentrated artillery and mortar fire was brought down on the German positions facing 25th Corps, while 15th Air Army and Long-Range Aviation bombed artillery deployment areas overnight. The attack began at 0800 hours, following another 10-minute artillery onslaught, and the two panzer divisions, suffering heavy losses, fell back to the west. The 186th took the strongpoints of Novaya Zhizn and Bortnoe and then exploited toward height 260.0, bypassing Sychi from the south. 8th Panzer, in particular, attempted to halt the advance with counterattacks, but these failed. Within three hours of the start of the July 19 offensive the 25th Corps had broken the entire defense along the Oleshnya River, penetrating the German lines to a depth of 3–4 km and widening the breach to 8–10 km. This was sufficient for the commitment of 3rd Guards Tanks, which left its jumping-off areas at 1040.

At 1130 hours the leading tanks reached the 186th and 362nd along the line Arsenovo–Bortnoe while also crushing resistance in the Sychi area. 25th Corps now captured Sychi, height 260.0 and Pokrovka and continued attacking toward Protasovo. At 1400 up to 100 panzers with motorized infantry were thrown into a counterattack near Sychi, striking 12th Guards Tank Corps, but this was beaten back. By the end of the day, increasing artillery fire and air attacks, coupled with counterattacks, brought the tanks to a temporary halt. 25th Corps, turning southward in the wake of the armor, encountered stubborn resistance east of Protasovo and became involved in heavy fighting, now 8–10 km into the German lines. Following the success of 3rd Guards Tanks, the 1st Guards Tank Corps entered the breach from Bortnoe and advanced toward Protasovo, while 308th Division further widened the breach. The German Mtsensk group of forces was now threatened with encirclement.

=== Capture of Oryol ===
Overnight the German command decided to pull back its forces from the Mtsensk area and from the area between the Optukha and Oka Rivers. This was only partially successful and a significant fraction of this grouping was surrounded and destroyed through July 21–22. Meanwhile, on July 20 the German forces facing the left wing of 3rd Army were also falling back, trying to get beyond the Oka. By July 21 the 186th was deployed along the Oka from Zolotilovo to Khitrovo. General Gorbatov now assigned missions to his forces for the capture of Oryol. 25th Corps, still with the two tank regiments, was to force a crossing in the Khryki area, as well as bridgeheads over the Optukha at several points; it was to have its main forces along the line Khryki–Parakhino for the attack on Oryol from the northeast. The Oka was a major barrier, made more difficult due to the lack of preliminary preparation and a lack of crossing equipment. Several efforts to "bounce" the river on July 22 were beaten back by artillery, air attacks, and counterattacks, and Gorbatov now decided to consolidate, bring up his artillery, and prepare for a more deliberate effort.

General Popov concurred with this decision in orders issued on the night of July 23/24, in which he ordered Gorbatov and the commander of 63rd Army to complete the liberation of Oryol. 3rd Army would attack from the north while 63rd Army attacked from the south and southeast, beginning on July 25. As the 3rd Guards Tank Army and 1st Guards Tank Corps had been pulled back into Front reserve, 3rd Army received the 17th Tank Brigade. Gorbatov decided to conduct a holding defense with two divisions while 25th Corps and three other divisions launched a powerful attack along the Army's right flank in the general direction of Andrianovo, Nelbova and Raspopovskye Dvoriki, and then to the southwest and south, deeply outflanking the city. 25th Corps, along with 17th Tanks, was to concentrate in the Golovlevo area in readiness to develop any success in the zones of 342nd and 269th Rifle Divisions.

Overnight, 3rd Army units completed their preparations for the offensive, particularly engineering tasks. The infantry went over to the attack at 0800 hours. The Oka was crossed, mostly by improvised means, in 20–30 minutes. The weight of artillery fire significantly weakened the German resistance, and the 342nd and 269th Divisions both made significant gains before running into a powerful counterattack by 20th Motorized Division just before midnight. Gorbatov decided to take advantage of the 342nd's successes and ordered it to move up to a line from Apalkovo to Chupakhina on July 26, consolidate, and support the commitment of 25th Corps. The Corps was to cross the Oka that morning and attack from the line Gorka–Gorodishche toward height 234.1 and Polyana. On the same date, Colonel Yatskevich was replaced in command by Col. Grigorii Vasilevich Revunenkov, who had led the 25th Corps in early March. This officer would be promoted to the rank of major general on September 1.

Elements of the Corps, having quickly moved to the west bank at dawn under cover of heavy artillery fire and airstrikes, began to attack toward Kamenka, but immediately ran into massed German firepower. The German command, having discovered the Corps' deployment, threw some 100 Ju 87 dive bombers against the Gorka sector which continually bombed the Corps' units over a three-hour period. Under the circumstances the infantry went to ground and stayed there, despite support from tanks. By the end of the day the 186th captured Kamenka but was unable to advance further. The 283rd Rifle Division, which had also been committed from second echelon, failed to achieve its objectives. In two days of fighting the 3rd Army had barely dented the defense, and this continued on July 27. Gorbatov now ordered his divisions to dig in securely and prepare to attack on July 30. At about this time the 25th Corps was disbanded and the 186th came under direct Army command.

Having regrouped to the right flank, Gorbatov renewed the assault on July 30 in the general direction of Polozovskye Dvory, but it again achieved little success. Only the 362nd Division, in conjunction with the left flank of 61st Army, made a substantial advance. Heavy fighting continued through the next day along the line Kalugino–Razinkina, with repeated counterattacks that continued past dusk. This level of activity raised the suspicions of the commander of the 362nd, who intensified his reconnaissance; at 0200 hours his scouts reported that the German forces were withdrawing, and immediately moved to pursue. This was followed by Gorbatov's orders for a general advance. The 186th, having crushed the resistance of the German rearguards, began to advance quickly to the southwest and by the end of August 1 had reached a line from Polozovskye Dvory to Nikolskii. As a result of the pursuit the Army's units advanced 12–14 km to the south and southwest and deeply outflanked Oryol from the northwest. By noon on August 2 the division had reached the Nepolod River on a sector from Koryakina to Zhitkaya. The German forces hastily dug in along the south bank and resumed fierce resistance, repelling all efforts to force crossings off the march.

On this day, Sen. Sgt. Stepan Parfyonovich Votinov of the 227th Antitank Battalion distinguished himself in combat. He was of Chuvash nationality. As commander of one of the battalion's 45mm guns he had directed fire in July that had destroyed a German assault gun and up to 50 personnel near the village of Arsenyevo. On August 2, he and his crew knocked out another assault gun and a tank near Malaya Kruglitsa. After the rest of the crew was killed he continued to fire alone. After further tanks broke into the position Votinov destroyed one of them with a grenade, at the cost of his life. On June 4, 1944, he was posthumously made a Hero of the Soviet Union.

Gorbatov decided to lead his next effort with the 308th Division. As the 186th was reaching the Nepolod, the 308th attacked along the right bank of the Oka to break the line along the former. Following a short artillery onslaught it forced the Optukha in several places and began attacking along the railroad leading to Oryol. This advance continued on August 3, while the larger part of the Army continued engaging along the Nepolod. By the end of the day the German Oryol grouping was surrounded on three sides and its systematic destruction began. Throughout August 4 bloody fighting raged in the eastern part of the city, which continued until 1900 hours, and by dawn the next day it had been completely cleared. Gorbatov now regrouped his forces to continue the pursuit.

== Into Belarus ==
Operation Kutuzov ended on August 18 when Soviet forces reached the Hagen position at the base of the Oryol salient east of Bryansk. During the month the 186th was transferred to the 53rd Rifle Corps of 11th Army, still in Bryansk Front. Prior to the start of Operation Suvorov the 11th Army was transferred to Western Front, but the division returned to 3rd Army, where it joined General Urbanovich's 41st Corps. Bryansk Front was disbanded on October 10 and 3rd Army was transferred to Central Front, which was redesignated as Belorussian Front on October 20. The Front was under command of Army Gen. K. K. Rokossovskii and the 186th would remain under his command for the duration of the war.

=== Gomel-Rechytsa Offensive ===
Beginning on October 15, Rokossovskii launched heavy attacks across the Dniepr River in the Loyew area in an effort to reach Rechytsa. To support this effort he ordered Gorbatov to attack across the Pronia River north and south of Krasnaya Sloboda against the defenses of German 9th Army. The main mission was to distract attention from the main attack farther south, and possibly to exploit to Novy Bykhaw. The latter was unrealistic due to 3rd Army's severe ammunition shortages. 41st Corps attacked at dawn on October 25 with the 186th, 269th, and 120th Guards Rifle Divisions in first echelon, backed by the Corps' 17th Rifle Division. In two days of ever-intensifying fighting Gorbatov's force created a bridgehead 1,000m deep and 5 km wide against the defenses of the 267th Infantry Division, but could do no more. After suffering heavy losses the attacks were halted late on October 26. On November 1, Rokossovskii was forced to halt all his assaults due to the sheer fatigue of his troops.

=== Novy Bykhaw-Propoysk Offensive ===
After his forces had recovered somewhat, Rokossovskii planned a new operation with his 3rd and 50th Armies as part of his ongoing efforts to take Gomel and Rechytsa. Gorbatov was to attack across the Sozh River on November 22, with Lt. Gen. I. V. Boldin's 50th joining two days later. 3rd Army's main attack would be led by the four divisions of 80th Rifle Corps on a 5 km-wide sector between Studenets and Kastsyukowka, while other divisions would make tying-down attacks on other sectors. 41st Corps was in second echelon with the mission of "strengthening the blow and developing the offensive to the southwest and west;" the 186th was positioned in and around the villages of Krevalitska and Gatskevichy. The offensive was launched at 0900 hours after a 10-minute artillery preparation and quickly overcame the tactical defenses of the 267th and 110th Infantry Divisions and expanded the bridgehead to a depth of 8–10 km across a front of up to 20 km by nightfall. The 186th and 120th Guards, which followed and reinforced the assault force, cleared the German remnants from the forests around Lobyrevka by 2000, and most of the Army artillery crossed the Sozh during the night. Soviet sources claimed 200 prisoners taken, plus 41 artillery pieces and 50 mortars.

The next day, Gorbatov committed the entire 41st Corps to strengthen the attack and fill in the gaps in the expanding penetration front. The attack that followed continued day and night, and the 362nd Rifle Division liberated Propoysk. Soon after the attack began Col. Gen. W. Model, commander of 9th Army, asked permission from Hitler to abandon the territory between the Sozh and the Dniepr. Putting the request off for several days, Hitler finally agreed to a partial withdrawal, which turned into a race to the Dniepr after 50th and 63rd Armies joined the offensive. By the end of the month, 3rd Army had reached the Dniepr from Selets-Kholopeev to Gadilovichy, where it went over to the defense. However, 9th Army retained a sizeable bridgehead east of the river.

=== Rahachow-Zhlobin Offensive ===
At the start of February 1944 the 186th was still in 41st Corps with 120th Guards. On February 17, Rokossovskii's Front was reduced in size and redesignated as 1st Belorussian. A new offensive by 3rd and 50th Armies was launched on February 21. Gorbatov's aim was to force the Dniepr, which he had first proposed on January 13 and again on February 7; according to his information the German forces on the far side were quite thin. The first proposal was turned down by Rokossovskii due to Gorbatov's requested reinforcements being unavailable, but the second was accepted. In orders issued from Front headquarters on February 16 the 63rd Army was to be disbanded, with its forces incorporated into the 3rd. The crossing would be carried out by no fewer than seven divisions, and the 1st Guards Tank Corps would be available for support. The Army was to advance westward 40 km in three days, force both the Dniepr and the Drut Rivers, and if possible cover another 75 km to capture Babruysk. The 41st and 80th Rifle Corps would penetrate the defenses of the 31st Infantry Division on a 10 km-wide sector between Vishin and Shapchitsy.

Gorbatov's main forces, backed by the fire of about 800 guns and mortars, forced the Dniepr and established a sizeable bridgehead west of Kisteni early on February 22, aided by ice thickness of 8–12 cm and by infiltrating ski troops in the German rear. By day's end the lead elements of the two Corps also reached and crossed the Drut near Bolshaya Konoplitsa, 13 km north of Rahachow, tearing an 18 km-wide and 20 km-deep hole in the German defenses. 9th Army withdrew all its forces from the east bank of the Dniepr between Rahachow and Zhlobin while desperately trying to plug the gap with battle groups from 4th and 5th Panzer Divisions along the Drut plus reinforcing the 31st and 267th Infantry defenses north of the gap. After arriving late on February 24 and battle group of 20th Panzer Division finally stabilized the situation on the north flank of the penetration. By the time the fighting subsided two days later Gorbatov's and Boldin's Armies had taken Rahachow, established a large bridgehead on the west bank of the Dniepr, and broken the German defensive line along the Drut, despite their strenuous efforts to eliminate it. All in all, as the spring rasputitsa began to settle in, 1st Belorussian Front's forces were in an excellent to mount an offensive on Babruysk in the summer. The casualties in the operation totalled 31,277, including 7,164 killed, captured, or missing, out of a committed force of 232,000 personnel. By March 1 the 186th had been moved to 80th Corps, which was now under 50th Army's command. Later that month the Corps returned to 3rd Army.

== Operation Bagration ==
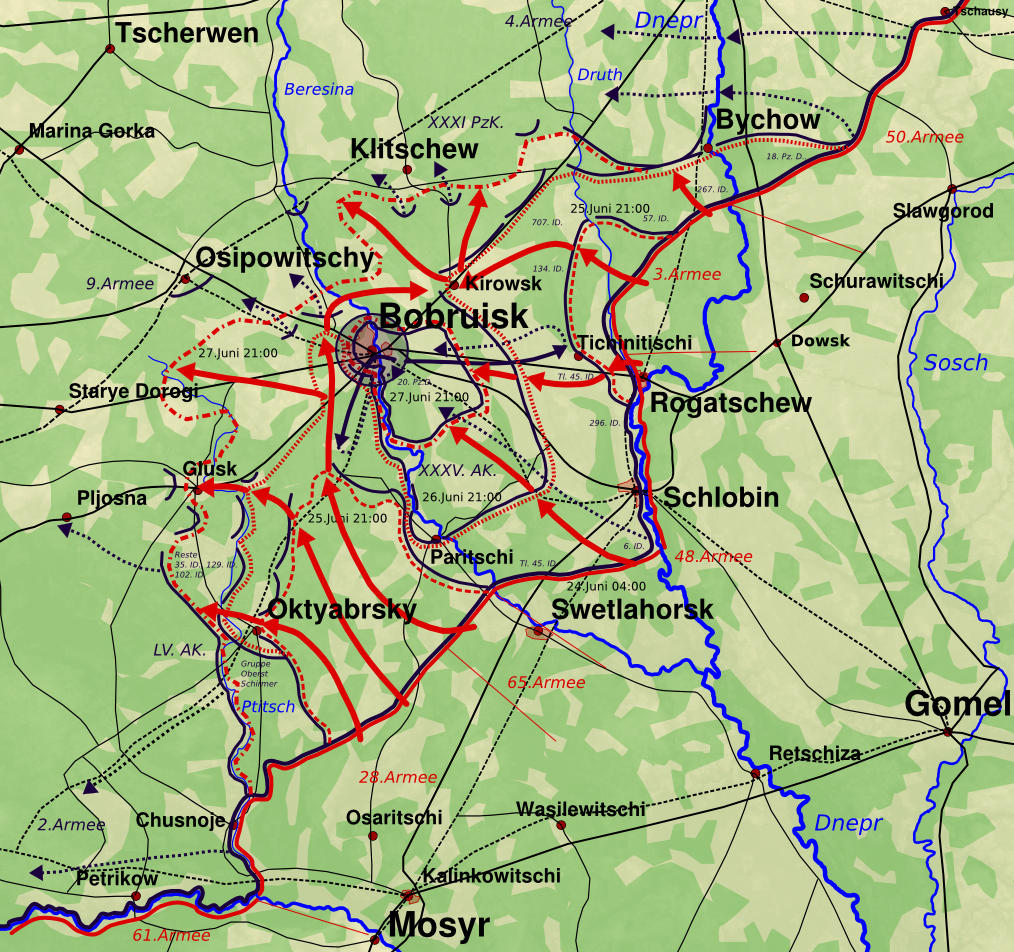
Babruysk operation. Note position of 3rd Army.

At the start of the summer offensive the 3rd Army was unusually large, with five rifle corps under command, including the 80th (186th, 5th, and 283rd Divisions). The divisions averaged about 7,200 personnel at this time. The 41st and 35th Rifle Corps were designated as the Army's main strike force from its bridgehead across the Dniepr. 80th Corps, along with 40th Rifle Corps, was in the northern sector of the Army's front, spread on a long line east of the Dniepr, essentially the line it had reached in March. It was facing the very overstretched 57th Infantry Division. This division had suffered heavy casualties in the battle of Korsun–Cherkassy and had been rebuilt from young and inexperienced men. Due to extensive marshlands no attack was expected (or, indeed, planned) on this sector.

Rokossovskii began his offensive against 9th Army, now led by Gen. der Inf. H. Jordan, with an artillery bombardment beginning at 0200 hours on June 23. While 40th Corps took full part in this, 80th Corps' front remained relatively quiet. Despite the massive attacks on this first day the defenders maintained a cohesive front. On June 24 a further massive bombardment started at 0400 and lasted two hours, directed at the XXXV Corps near Rahachow. Then a total of 11 rifle divisions of 3rd and 48th Armies fell on 14 German battalions. 3rd Army initially made little progress as rain had shut down air operations. As the weather improved both Armies made greater gains. The attack continued through the night. The arrival of part of 20th Panzer Division at 0600 promised some relief, but its counterattack was futile.

At 1000 hours on June 25, the 35th and 41st Corps attacked the 134th Infantry Division, and the 9th Tanks changed direction to strike a weak point. The 40th, 41st, and 80th Corps followed the 9th Tanks. The gap between XXXV Corps and the 57th Infantry opened to 15 km. By midnight the Corps was being pushed west of the Dniepr and the Drut by 3rd Army, backed by 9th Tanks plus two corps of 48th Army. The Soviet force was driving due west toward Babryusk and threatening to cut off six German divisions in a pocket southeast of the city. Jordan was demanding permission to withdraw, and finally the 383rd Infantry Division was ordered to begin moving by truck toward Babryusk at 0900 on June 26. On the same day, northwest of the city, 9th Tanks crossed the rear of XXXV Corps, reached Startsy, and caught up with the columns of retreating trucks, which were largely destroyed or abandoned. 3rd Army crossed the Berezina River at Titovka and continued pushing west; XXXV Corps turned and tried to break out to the north, but was stopped.

At 0815 hours the following morning, as 48th Army was driving German remnants into Babruysk, a counterattack at Titovka by the 383rd and part of 20th Panzer failed to reopen the road, at the cost of heavy casualties. Armored units of 3rd Army were working to complete the encirclement to the east, while the main body found a gap between the 57th and 707th Infantry Divisions and arrived at Lyubanichi on the Berezina. Between them the 3rd and 48th Armies eliminated the survivors of XXXV Corps that were still trying to escape northward. Meanwhile, 9th Tanks cut the rail line to Minsk at Asipovichy. Jordan ordered the 383rd to hold Babruysk to cover the remainder of 9th Army's attempt to break out to Minsk, but this was countermanded by Army Group before Hitler finally relented at 1600 hours.

On the morning of June 28, somewhere between 40,000 and 70,000 German troops were trapped in and around Babruysk. The closest organized German positions were at Asipovichy, over 50 km northeast. During the day the 3rd and 48th Armies turned to begin mopping up the trapped force and defend against breakout efforts. Hitler gave orders early in the afternoon for the entire force to abandon the city and this began overnight, with mixed results. The final push to take Babruysk started at 1000 hours on June 29, with 3rd Army attacking from the north. The city was officially cleared during the afternoon, and while tens of thousands of German troops managed to break out, all but a fraction were rounded up or killed before reaching safety. On July 2, the 186th was recognized for its part in this victory with the award of the Order of the Red Banner.

=== Lublin–Brest Offensive ===
During the afternoon of July 1 the 35th Rifle Corps, leading 3rd Army, took the town of Cherven, cutting the Minsk–Mogilev road, and the following day linked up with units of 50th Army after overcoming resistance along the Minsk road. The 80th and 41st Corps were coming up behind as part of the Army's main attack toward that city, some 50–55 km to the northeast and north. At 2300 hours, Rokossovskii ordered his 1st Guards Tanks, and then the 3rd and 48th Armies, to push through the night and capture Minsk as quickly as possible. Led by the armor, Gorbatov's right flank reached the city's southeastern outskirts by 1600, at which point further orders from Rokossovskii directed the Army to bypass it and continue to pursue in the direction of Dzyarzhynsk. During the day the Army's right flank covered 45–48 km in total. On July 4 the STAVKA transferred 3rd Army to 2nd Belorussian Front. However, 80th Corps remained under direct command of 1st Belorussian, and on July 5 was being held in reserve behind the Front's right flank.

During the subsequent advance on Baranavichy and Slonim (July 5–15) the 80th Corps remained in reserve. Later in the month the 186th was transferred to 46th Rifle Corps in 65th Army. It would remain under these commands for the duration of the war. At the start of the Brest-Siedlce operation on July 17 the 46th Corps remained in second echelon, along with 1st Guards Tank Corps and the 1st Polish Army. Near the end of this offensive the 186th took part in the liberation of the city of Brest, on the pre-war border with Poland, and received the name of that place as an honorific:

BREST... 186th Rifle Division (Maj. Gen. Revunenkov, Grigorii Vasilevich)... The troops who participated in the liberation of Brest, by the order of the Supreme High Command of 28 July 1944, and a commendation in Moscow, are given a salute of 20 artillery salvoes from 224 guns.

In early September the 186th was approaching the Narew River in Poland. Sen. Sgt. Afanasii Filippovich Petrik, a Ukrainian by nationality, was an assistant platoon commander in the 255th Sapper Battalion. During the period of September 5–8 he organized the transport of infantry, regimental guns, and supplies on rafts over the river, near the village of Łacha (north of Serock) despite being lightly wounded. On March 24, 1945, he was made a Hero of the Soviet Union. After the war he lived in Krasnoturyinsk, where he worked in metallurgy until his retirement, and died there on September 14, 2001.

== Into Poland and Germany ==
On November 17, Marshal Rokossovskii was moved to command of the 2nd Belorussian Front. In order to soften the blow of this "demotion" he was allowed to transfer 65th Army, under command of his protege, Col. Gen. P. I. Batov, to his new Front. Ten days later, General Revunenkov was hospitalized due to illness. After he recovered in April 1945 he was given command of the 86th Rifle Corps in Transbaikal Front. He would continue to serve postwar, reaching the rank of lieutenant general in May 1949. Col. Semyon Savvich Velichko, who had been serving as deputy commander of 108th Rifle Division, took over the 186th for the duration of the war.

On December 17, Rokossovskii issued his operational directive for the forthcoming Vistula-Oder offensive, which included:

7. The 65th Army... will launch its main attack on the left flank along the front Obrębek–Budy Ciepielińskie (a breakthrough front of seven kilometres) along the axis Jackowo–Nowe Miasto–Sochocin–Drobin.
The immediate objective is to break through the enemy's defense and by the close of the operation's first day reach the line Beliany–Kendzezawice–Nasielsk.

In order to develop the success of the breakthrough the Army was to be reinforced with the 3rd Guards Tank Corps.

On January 14, 1945, 65th Army broke through the German defense along a 12–13 km front and advanced in fighting from 3 to 5 km. A further advance of 3 to 4 km was made the next day following a 12-minute onslaught by all its artillery. The attack continued overnight, and during January 16 the Army gained up to 20 km, captured the German strongpoint at Nasielsk and cut the railroad from Ciechanów to Modlin. On January 18 the Mława fortified area was secured by combined forces of 5th Guards Tank, 48th and 65th Armies. The town of Płońsk was taken the next day and the 238th Rifle Regiment (Lt. Colonel Guseinov, Gusein Iosifovich) was given its name as a battle honor. On February 19 the 298th Rifle Regiment would be recognized for its part in the battles for Mława, Działdowo and Płońsk with the award of the Order of Suvorov, 3rd Degree.

=== East Pomeranian Offensive ===
By the end of January 26 the 65th Army had reached the approaches to Marienwerder and Graudenz and the east bank of the Vistula River southwest of Graudenz. The East Pomeranian offensive began on February 10. As of February 24 the 65th Army was fighting along a line roughly from Skurz to Wda to Osowo to Schwartzwasser. By March 5 elements of 2nd Belorussian Front had reached the Baltic Sea north and northwest of Köslin, cutting off the German forces in the Danzig area from Germany; however 65th Army had only managed to advance 8–10 km during this period. From March 14–30 the 8th Mechanized Corps worked with 46th Corps in the final reduction of the German Danzig-Gdynia grouping. As a result of the fighting for Danzig several of the 186th's subunits received decorations:

- 238th Rifle Regiment - Order of the Red Banner
- 327th Artillery Regiment - Order of Kutuzov, 3rd Degree
- 227th Antitank Battalion - Order of Kutuzov, 3rd Degree
- 255th Sapper Battalion - Order of the Red Star
- 244th Signal Battalion - Order of Alexander Nevsky

All of these were awarded on May 17.

=== Berlin Strategic Offensive ===
For the offensive into central Germany the 65th was one of four combined-arms armies deployed by 2nd Belorussian Front along the northern reaches of the Oder River. The Army deployed along the 17 km front from Altdamm to Ferdinandstein, and was to launch its main attack with its left wing, forcing the West Oder and breaking through along a 4 km sector from Kurow to Kolbitzow. The 186th was one of the Army's seven divisions grouped along the axis of the main attack. 46th Corps had a two-echelon formation, with the division in first echelon. The strength of the Army's rifle divisions varied from 3,600 to 4,800 men at this time.

General Batov had designated special reconnaissance groups from his forces, including a reinforced regiment from both the 186th and 108th Divisions of 46th Corps. The main area of interest was along the highway from Retzowsfelde to Kolbitzow. The forcing of the East Oder River began at dawn on April 18, using boats, pontoons and improvised means of crossing, with cover from artillery fire and smokescreens. After landing on the west bank, the German screening forces were quickly swept aside and by the end of the day the east bank of the West Oder had been reached at several places despite severe restrictions on movement due to the flooded terrain. Operations continued the next day to round up small German groupings and build up strength for the further crossings. As well, the East Oder was bridged at several points.

65th Army began forcing the West Oder at 0715 hours on April 20 simultaneously with the start of a 45-minute artillery preparation. 46th Corps' forward detachments managed to seize a bridgehead in the Niederzaden area, breaking through the German defense along the riverbank by 0800. Heavy resistance and counterattacks by infantry and tanks of the 27th SS Langemarck and 28th SS Wallonien were beaten off. By day's end the 108th and 186th had reached positions from 500m north of the Niederzaden brick works to Niederzaden to the west slopes of height 65.4. During April 21 the Corps' forward units managed to advance another 500–1,000m while fending off further counterattacks and crossing its third division, the 413th.

46th Corps continued to expand its bridgehead at 1000 hours on April 22, following a massive artillery strike, and by the end of the day had reached a line from Hohen Zaden to the eastern outskirts of Kolbitzow. As German resistance weakened, by the end of April 24 the Corps had reached a line from the outskirts of Pritzlow to Schmellentin to height 76.2. The next day it got as far as Barnimslow with its front facing northwards towards the Baltic coast. During April 25 the Army was approaching the German second defense line, which was based on the Randow River. With the support of the 1st Guards Tanks it advanced up to 10 km on its left flank. 3rd Panzer Army threw in what little it had in reserves, including the 1st Marine Division, the 389th Infantry and 549th Volksgrenadier Divisions, and an SS brigade. These launched 13 counterattacks in company to battalion strength, supported by armor, but all failed to halt the advance. 46th Corps reached a line from Karow to Hohenhof Creek, again facing north.

On April 26 the 105th Rifle Corps took Stettin by storm while the 46th and 18th Rifle Corps attacked to the northwest, forced the Randow and broke through the second German defensive zone. During this fighting the latter two corps repulsed four German counterattacks carried out by the 50th SS Police Brigade, remnants of the 610th Reserve Division and 1st Marine Division. By the end of the day, after an advance of 10–12 km, they reached a line from Saltsow to Wollschow to Battin. German resistance along the lower Oder was now effectively crushed. As a result, on the following day the Army, still with 1st Guards Tanks, covered 20–22 km, and the remainder of the campaign was a rapid advance of up to 34 km per day against small covering detachments. During May 4–5 the 186th joined forces of 2nd Shock Army's 108th Rifle Corps in clearing the island of Rügen, where it ended the war.

== Postwar ==
The division ended the war as the 186th Rifle, Brest, Order of the Red Banner Division. (Russian: 186-я стрелковая Брестская Краснознамённая дивизия.) However, further awards were to follow. On June 4, the division as a whole was presented with the Order of Suvorov, 2nd Degree, for its part in the battle for Stettin and the surrounding area, as well as the Order of Kutuzov, 2nd Degree, for seizing Rügen. For the same operation the 238th Rifle Regiment and the 327th Artillery Regiment received the Order of Suvorov, 3rd Degree, and the 255th Signal Battalion was given the Order of Kutuzov, 3rd Degree.

Under the terms of STAVKA Order No. 11097, dated May 29, 2nd Belorussian Front was to be redesignated as the Northern Group of Forces, effective June 10. 65th Army was to be part of this Group, and was to withdraw to the area of Łódź, Poznań, and Wrocław by July 3. The 186th was disbanded in this area in June 1946.
