= Tetiana Rychkova =

Ukrainian volunteer and politician

- Тетяна Ричкова
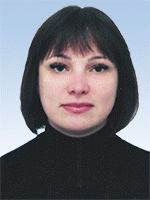
- Official portrait, 2016

People's Deputy of Ukraine
- In office 1 August 2016 – 29 August 2019
- Preceded by: Borys Filatov
- Succeeded by: Viacheslav Medianyk
- Constituency: No.27 (Dnipro)

Personal details
- Born: 7 October 1978 (age 47) Dnipropetrovsk, Ukrainian SSR, Soviet Union (now Dnipro, Ukraine)
- Party: European Solidarity
- Education: National Metallurgical Academy of Ukraine

Military service
- Allegiance: Ukraine
- Branch/service: Ministry of Defence
- Years of service: 2015–present

Tetiana Borysivna Rychkova (Ukrainian: Тетя́на Бори́сівна Ричко́ва; born 7 October 1978) is a Ukrainian volunteer and politician who served as a People's Deputy of Ukraine from Ukraine's 27th electoral district from 2016 to 2019. Previously, she volunteered to raise money for the Armed Forces of Ukraine.

== Early life and career ==
Tetiana Rychkova was born on 7 October 1978, in Dnipro. In 2000, she graduated from the National Metallurgical Academy of Ukraine with a degree in "enterprise economist-financier" and began working as a private entrepreneur. In 2013, she opened a bakery.

In 2000, she married neurophysicist Vadym Rychkov. During the Revolution of Dignity, he became a pro-Euromaidan activist, and in March 2014 he volunteered for the 25th Airborne Brigade stationed in Hvardiiske, Dnipropetrovsk Oblast. As part of his service, Rychkov fought at the battles of Sloviansk and Kramatorsk, as well as other battles in Luhansk Oblast.

== Volunteer activities ==
At the beginning of the War in Donbas, Rychkova went to the front after her husband and became involved in supporting the Ukrainian military. She sold her dacha in Dnipro and her bakery and withdrew money from deposits to buy the most necessary things for the 25th brigade, including uniforms, berets, generators. Then she engaged in fundraising and support for the Ukrainian Air Force. She founded the Dnipro branch of Phoenix Wings.

She was at the front during the battles of Sloviansk, Kramatorsk, Lyman, Yampil, Debaltseve, Vuhlehirsk, Doslidnyiy, Pisky, Avdiivka. Rychkova's last car, in which she took out the wounded, was blown up by a direct hit from a mine at Donetsk Airport.

On 17 August 2014, Rychkova's husband was killed during fighting in Nizhny Krynka-Zhdanivka region of Donetsk Oblast after being hit by a Russian BM-21 Grad missile strike. After burying her husband, Rychkova continued to support the military, actively criticizing the state of affairs in the Armed Forces.

In November 2014, at the invitation of Yurii Biriukov, Tetiana Rychkova started working at the Ministry of Defense. She became the head of a new state-owned enterprise that deals with the material supply of special operations forces and airborne troops.

On 26 January 2015, she signed a contract and became an officer in the Armed Forces of Ukraine. She was appointed Assistant Minister of Defense for Reforms. Since the spring of the same year, she has been an assistant to the Chief of the General Staff.

In March 2015, she was tasked with addressing issues of discipline and psychological support within the army. She is involved in the development of a psychological assistance program for military personnel and the creation of centers for assistance to ATO participants within regional state administrations. She was involved in the creation of the Center for the Development and Support of the Armed Forces Logistics.

In May 2015, she was included in the Commission of State Awards and Heraldry, and in November of the same year she became a member of the Organizing Committee for the preparation and implementation of measures to create a memorial to Ukrainian heroes.

== Political career ==
In the midterm elections to the Verkhovna Rada of Ukraine on 17 July 2016, Tetiana Rychkova ran as a self-nominated candidate in Ukraine's 27th electoral district, located in Dnipro. She took first place with 44.57% of the vote (15,494 votes) and was inaugurated as a People's Deputy of Ukraine on 1 August 2016.

== Recognition ==
She was awarded the Order of Princess Olga, 3rd class (August 2014) and the Order of Bohdan Khmelnytsky, 3rd class (December 2014) for her help to the army. On 25 December 2018, she was included in Russia's sanctions list.
