= Computerra =

Russian magazine and website dedicated to computer technology

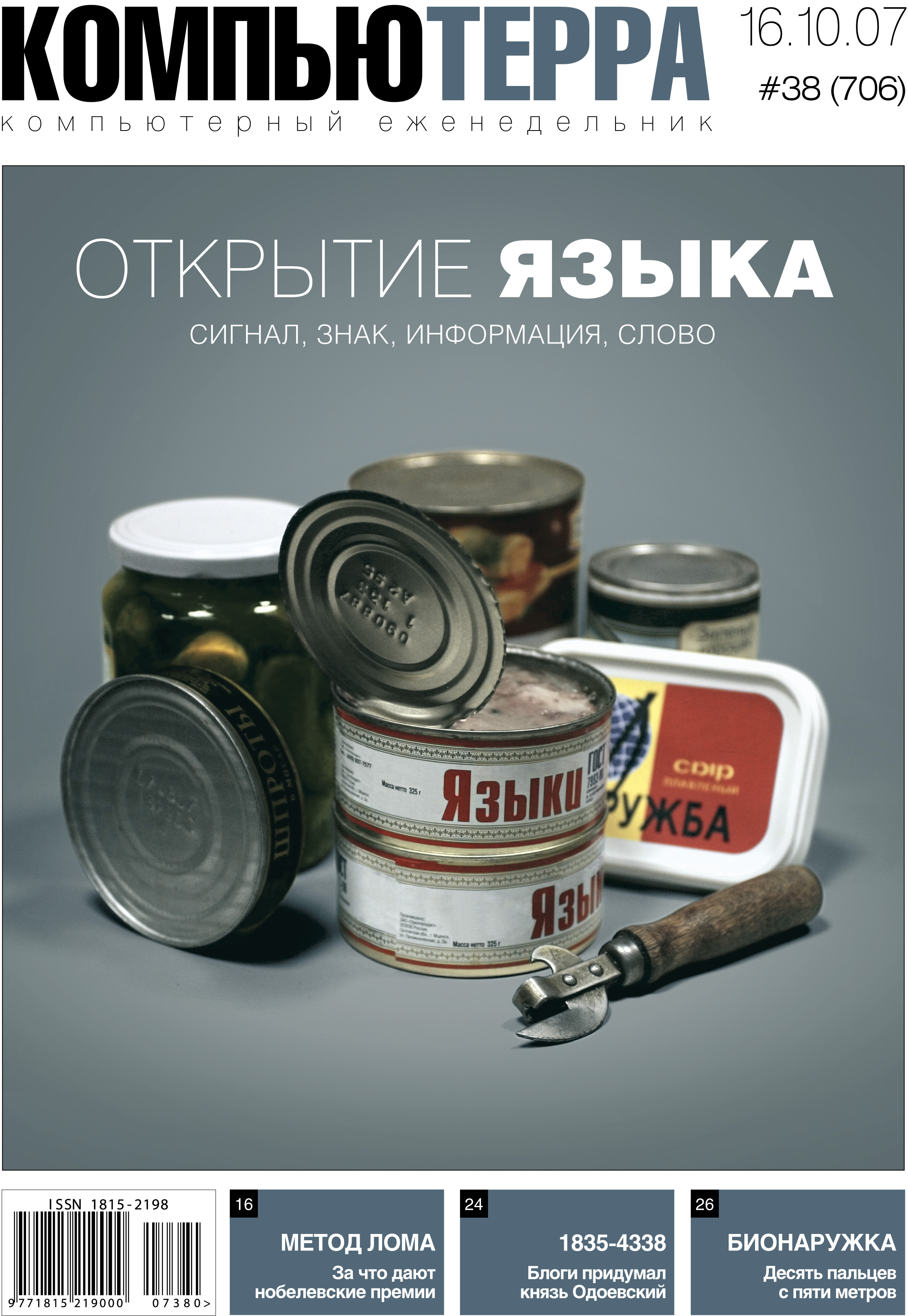
- Computerra #706 cover
- Editor-in-Chief: Vladislav Biryukov
- Categories: Computer magazine
- Frequency: Weekly and online (before December 15, 2009); online-only (after December 15, 2009)
- Circulation: 64,000 / week (December 2009)
- Publisher: C&C Computer Publishing Limited
- First issue: December 21, 1992
- Final issue Number: December 15, 2009 #47–48 (811–812)
- Company: C&C Computer Publishing Limited
- Country: Russia
- Based in: Moscow
- Language: Russian
- Website: old.computerra.ru
- ISSN: 1815-2198

Computerra (Russian: Компьюте́рра) was a Russian computer weekly publication. The first edition was released on December 21, 1992 and was published by C&C Computer Publishing Limited (Computerra Publishing House). Later, it was supplemented by a website at www.computerra.ru. Due to financial problems and lack of advertisement material, the issue 811–812 on December 15, 2009 was the last issue to be published offline, with only the online version remaining active. The last issue cover lacks a usual cover image, with only the black rectangle instead and the words roughly translatable as "It's now safe to turn off your computerra", as a pun on the shutdown image of Windows 95.

The founder was Dmitriy Mendrelyuk. The magazine was based in Moscow. There are some other magazines founded by him like Business-Journal (Russian: Би́знес-Журна́л).

The typical audience of Computerra magazine was working men aged 25–34, with high social status, high or medium income level, using computers.

The difference of Computerra from other computer magazines is that it writes not only about computer hardware and software, but includes philosophical thoughts about life, and "computer people" life above all.

Alexa.com traffic rank for Computerra.ru official website is 36,816 as of January 2016.

== History ==
Editors-in-chief:

- Georgiy Kuznetsov (1995–1998)
- Eugene Kozlovsky (1998–2004)
- Sergey Leonov (2004–2006)
- Dmitriy Mendrelyuk (temporary in 2006)
- Vladimir Guriev 2007–2008
- Vladislav Biryukov
