= Vladimir Guriyev =

Russian writer and journalist (born 1976)

Vladimir Vladimirovich Guriyev (Russian: Влади́мир Влади́мирович Гури́ев; born 1976) is a Russian technology journalist best known for works at Computerra magazine.

== Biography ==
- 1976 — was born
- since 1998 — prints in Computerra
- 2001—2003 — editor-in-chief of Computerra Plus
- 2003—2007 — senior editor of Computerra
- 2007—2008 — editor-in-chief of Computerra
- since 2008 — senior editor of Computerra

== Works ==
Vladimir Guriyev has written several hundred articles, published in: Computerra, Home Computer, Infobusiness, CIO, Business-magazine. For two years, he was an editor-in-chief of Computerra.

He is also the author of a book of satiric writings.

Preceded by Dmitriy Mendrelyuk	Editor-in-chief of Computerra; 2007—2008	Succeeded by Vladislav Biryukov
