= Viacheslav Medianyk =

Ukrainian politician

- В'ячеслав Медяник
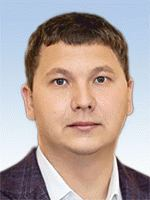

People's Deputy of Ukraine
- Incumbent
- Assumed office 29 August 2019
- Preceded by: Tetiana Rychkova
- Constituency: Dnipropetrovsk Oblast, No. 27

Personal details
- Born: 3 August 1987 (age 39) Snizhne, Ukrainian SSR, Soviet Union (now Ukraine)
- Party: Servant of the People
- Education: Dnipropetrovsk State University of Internal Affairs

Viacheslav Anatoliiovych Medianyk (Ukrainian: В'ячеслав Анатолійович Медяник; born 3 August 1987) is a Ukrainian lawyer, entrepreneur, politician, and member of the Verkhovna Rada of Ukraine of the 9th convocation, a member of the Committee on Law Enforcement Issues and the head of the subcommittee on legislation regarding administrative offenses and security and detective activities.

== Early life and career ==
Medianyk was born on 3 August 1987, in the city of Snizhne, Donetsk Oblast.

He graduated from the Faculty of Law of the Dnipropetrovsk State University of Internal Affairs and holds a Ph.D. in political science. He defended his dissertation on the topic "Political Representation in the Functioning of the State Mechanism in Transitional Societies".

Medianyk began his entrepreneurial career in 2002, when he was a teenager and created a company with an investment of US$100,000.

He was engaged in the construction business, but shortly before receiving his parliamentary mandate, he sold his shares. He served as the coordinator of the legal department in the National Defense Headquarters of Dnipropetrovsk Oblast.

== Political career ==
Medianyk began his political career as an assistant to the member of the Dnipropetrovsk City Council, Yevheniy Zhadan, during the 6th convocation.

He later worked as an assistant to Andriy Denysenko, a member of the 8th convocation of the Verkhovna Rada, and Mykola Palamarchuk, a member of the 7th convocation of the Verkhovna Rada, on a public basis.

In 2019, Medianyk was elected as a People's Deputy of Ukraine for Ukraine's 27th electoral district in Dnipro (Soborniy district, part of Samarskyi district, part of Tsentralnyi District of Dnipro) representing the Servant of the People party. At the time of the election, he was a private entrepreneur and non-partisan. He resides in Dnipro.

He is a deputy member of the Permanent Delegation to the Parliamentary Assembly of the Council of Europe, Chairman of the Subcommittee on Legislation on Administrative Offenses and Security and Detective Activities, He participated in the development of a draft law on private detective activities. Deputy Co-chair of the Inter-Parliamentary Relations Group with the Republic of Korea, and a member of several inter-parliamentary relations groups with the United Arab Emirates, the Republic of Singapore, the Republic of Austria, Japan, and Canada.

He is a member of the following inter-factional associations: Ukrainians in the World, ODESHCHYNA, Slobozhan Ukraine, DNIPRO!

He is active in legislative activities (in 2019, he submitted 19 draft laws and 3 amendments). He was one of the initiators of the draft law 2695, which provides for increased responsibility for drunk driving and significant expansion of police powers.

As of 18 December 2019, the voting results for Medianyk were as follows: For – 1,008; Did not vote – 207; Against – 21; Abstained – 297.

In October 2019, the Specialized Anti-Corruption Prosecutor's Office (SAPO) launched an investigation into Medianyk's correspondence in which he discussed how to resolve issues with prosecutors.

During the local elections in 2020, he declared a gift worth more than 1 million hryvnias.

== Personal life ==
Medianyk is married, and has four daughters and one son. The family is considered leaders in terms of the number of properties among Dnipro deputies.

His father was Anatoliy Medianyk (who died in 2017), a former chief of the special unit for combating corruption and organized crime of the Security Service of Ukraine in Dnipropetrovsk Oblast.

His business partner is Yuriy Bereza, commander of the Dnipro-1 Regiment and a former People's Deputy of Ukraine.
