= 62nd Rifle Corps =

- Allegiance: Soviet Union
- Branch: Soviet Red Army
- Engagements: Eastern Front (World War II); Operation Barbarossa

The 62nd Rifle Corps was a corps of the Soviet Red Army. A component of the 22nd Army, it took part in the Great Patriotic War.

== Organization ==
- 170th Rifle Division
- 174th Rifle Division
- 186th Rifle Division

== Commanders ==
First Formation

- General-mayor Ivan Karmanov (1939-1941)
