= Phoenix Wings =

- Крила Фенікса
- Type: NGO
- Location: Kyiv, Ukraine
- Key people: Yury Biryukov
- Website: http://wings-phoenix.org.ua/en

The Phoenix Wings (Ukrainian: Крила Фенікса) are a volunteer organization that financially assists the Ukrainian Army and collects donations to support it. It was established by the Ukrainian activist Yury Biryukov on March 27, 2014. Tetiana Rychkova took a significant role in organization development.

== Activity ==
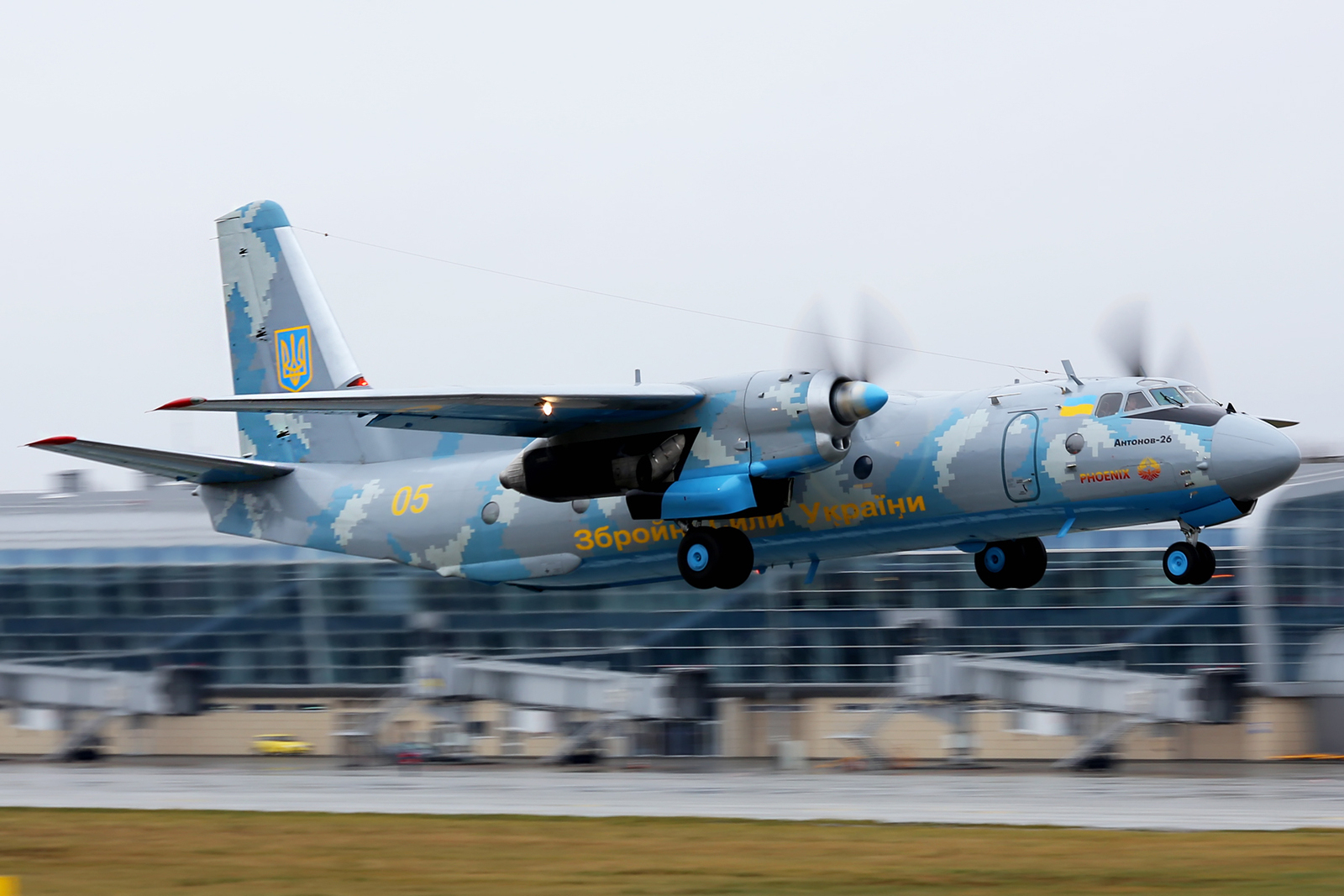
One of the restored An-26s. The Phoenix Wings logo is visible behind the nose cone

Phoenix Wings arose as an attempt to provide support to the Armed Forces of Ukraine following heavy losses suffered during the early stages of the Russo-Ukrainian War. Phoenix Wings mainly deals with technical support of the Armed Forces of Ukraine, but also delivers medicine to the wounded during the fighting, carries out restoration of Ukrainian military buildings, and so on.

The organization is also involved in the restoration of aircraft belonging to the Armed Forces of Ukraine. They helped to repair the aircraft AN-26, so the plane returned to the ranks of the Ukrainian army. The need for it has become particularly acute after the separatists in the Donbas destroyed an IL-76 aircraft, resulting in the deaths of 49 people who were on board.

During the entire period of the foundation, Phoenix Wings collected over 60 million hryvnias in donations. The organization purchased more than 1,000 articles of body armor. The fund also bought for the Armed Forces of Ukraine and continues to buy bulletproof helmets and portable radios, special materials for fortification, spaced armour for infantry fighting vehicles, armored cars, and other materials.

Members of Phoenix Wings also built a special facility in Mykolaiv for the 10th Naval Aviation Brigade, which moved from occupied Crimea. The building housed the engineering and technical staff of the team.

According to the website "Prestupnosty.net" (2014), there are 20 permanent members in Phoenix Wings, and the number of participants is growing.
