= Mikhail Biryukov =

Mikhail Biryukov may refer to:

- Mikhail Biryukov (footballer, born 1958) (born 1958), retired Soviet and Russian football player
- Mikhail Biryukov (tennis) (1992–2019), junior Russian tennis player
- Mikhail Biryukov (ice hockey) (born 1985), Russian ice hockey goaltender
- Mikhail Biryukov (footballer, born 1987) (born 1987), Russian football player
