= Nikolai Biryukov =

Soviet general, Hero of the Soviet Union (1901–1980)

Nikolai Ivanovich Biryukov (Russian: Николай Иванович Бирюков; 6 December 1901 Knyazhaya Baygora, Tambov Governorate – 30 June 1980) was a Soviet Army soldier and officer. He fought in the Russian Civil War and in World War II, where he attained the rank of lieutenant general, and was decorated Hero of the Soviet Union.

He joined the Red Army in March 1920, and shortly thereafter he participated in the suppression of the Tambov Rebellion. He steadily progressed through the ranks during the interwar years, and in February 1939 he was given command of the 186th Rifle Division of the Ural Military District. At the beginning of the Nazi invasion of the Soviet Union, Biryukov's division was attached to the 22nd Army and sent to the Western front. Biryukov was wounded in the Battle of Smolensk. After his recovery, he was given command of the 214th Rifle Division, with which he participated in the Battle of Stalingrad. In June 1943, Biryukov was given command of the 20th Guards Rifle Corps, part of the 4th Guards Army, a position he held until the end of the war. In 1945, Biryukov's corps fought with distinction against the German counteroffensive at Lake Balaton, for which Biryukov was awarded the title of Hero of the Soviet Union in April 1945.

Biryukov's memoirs were published in 1968 in 100,000 copies. His son, Anatoly Biryukov, became infamous as a serial killer.
