= Ivanova Gora =

Rural locality in Tver Oblast, Russia

Coordinates: 57°4′9″N 33°3′6″E

Ivanora Gora (Russian: Ива́нова Гора́) is a village in Ostashkovsky District of Tver Oblast, Russia.
