= Kastsyukowka =

Kastsyukowka Касцюкоўка (Belarusian)
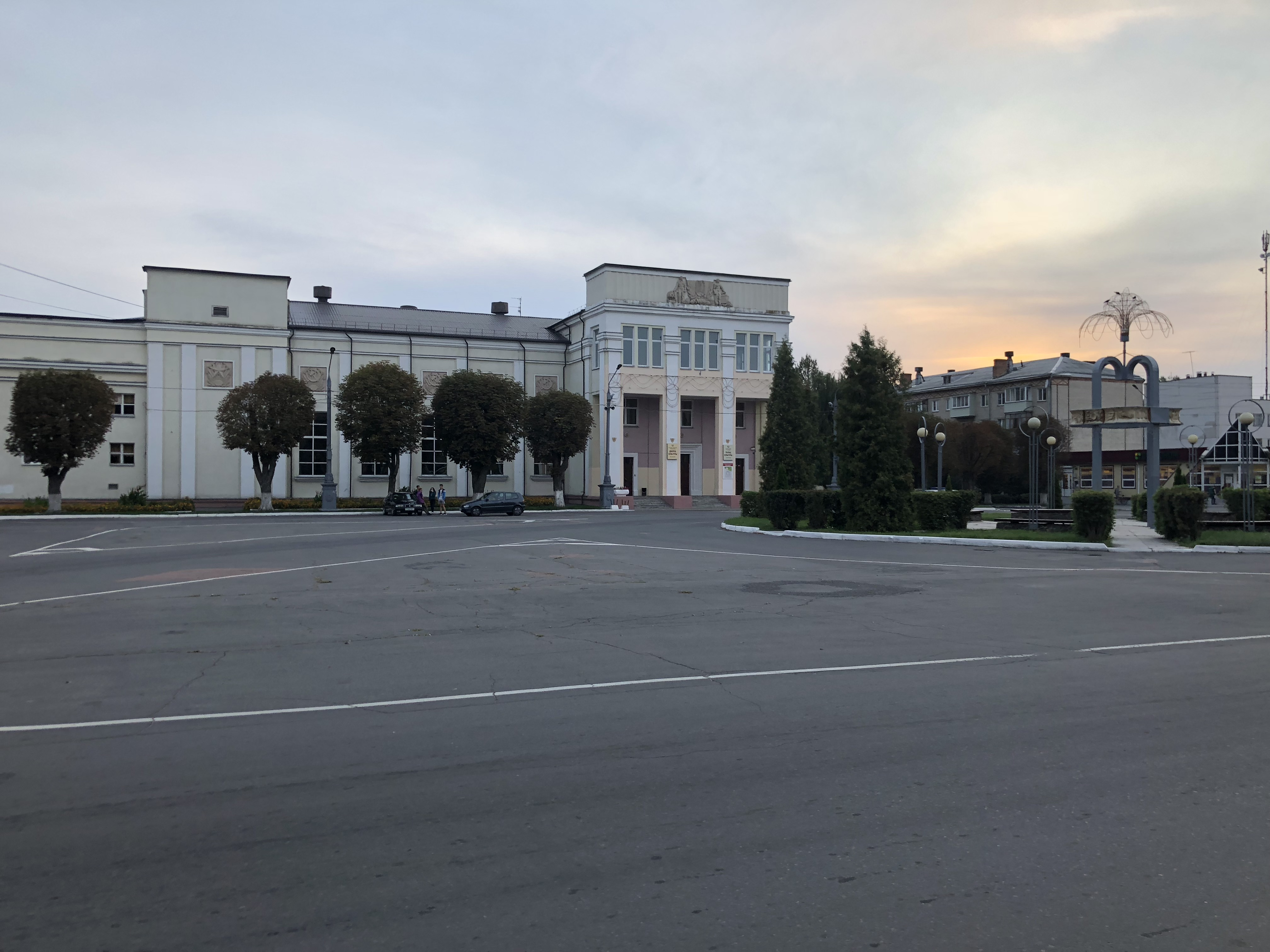
- Interactive map of Kastsyukowka
- Country: Belarus
- Municipality: Gomel

Population (2022)
  - Total: 10,397

Kastsyukowka (Belarusian: Касцюкоўка, romanized: Kasciukoŭka; Russian: Костюковка, romanized: Kostyukovka) is a microdistrict of the city of Gomel, Belarus. It is located in Čyhunačny district. Until 2016, it was an urban-type settlement.

== Architecture ==
The layout is quarterly, the buildings are predominantly brick, multi-storey.

== History ==
It was founded in the 19th century as a railway station of the Libavo-Romenskaya railway, which began operating in 1873. The settlement grew rapidly, a school was opened, a mill worked in the Pokolyubichsky volost of the Gomel district of the Mogilev province. Since 1879 there was a grain crusher. Every year, more than 400,000 poods of grain and timber cargo were taken out of the station.

In 1918, during the German occupation, the inhabitants stubbornly resisted the German Army. Released 30 November 1918. From 8 December 1926 to 3 March 1935, the center of the Kostyukovsky village council of the Gomel Region. Since 3 March 1935, within the borders of Gomel, since 14 August 1937, under the administrative subordination of the Gomel City Council. On 3 May 1931, a pig fattening station began to work. On 10 November 1933, the 1st mechanized glass factory in Belarus was put into operation. Since 27 September 1938 – a working settlement. During the Great Patriotic War, the plant's equipment and part of the workers were evacuated to Bashkiria. In August 1941, near the village of the Red Army, along with the Gomel militia on 18 August 1941, they fought heavy defensive battles. 15 Soviet soldiers were killed (buried in a mass grave). From 18 August 1941 to 26 November 1943, it was occupied by German invaders. 79 workers and employees died at the fronts.

From 1986 to 1996, it had the status of an urban settlement.

Since September 1996, the status of a working settlement has been returned.

On 14 February 2016, the settlement was included in the city limits of the city of Gomel and was deregistered as an independent settlement.

Since 12 May 2016, it has been included in the city of Gomel as the Kasciukoŭka microdistrict.

== Infrastructure ==
In Kasciukoŭka works JSC "Gomelsteklo", EE "Gomel State Agrarian and Industrial College" (previously called the Kostyukovsky State Agrarian and Technical Professional Lyceum), 2 secondary and music schools, a post office, 4 kindergartens, a Palace of Culture, a library, a hospital, a sports complex. The newspaper "Gomel glassmaker" is published here(since 1 May 1934).

== See also ==
- List of urban-type settlements in Belarus
