= Anatoly Biryukov =

Soviet serial killer

Anatoly Biryukov Анатолий Бирюков
- Born: Anatoly Nikolaevich Biryukov; 18 February 1939; Lopasnya, Moscow Oblast, RSFSR (present-day Chekhov, Moscow Oblast, Russia)
- Died: 24 February 1979 (aged 40); Moscow, RSFSR
- Cause of death: Execution by shooting
- Other name: "The Baby Hunter"
- Conviction: Murder with aggravating circumstances
- Penalty: Death

Details
- Victims: 5
- Span of crimes: 16 September – 19 October 1977
- Country: Soviet Union
- State: Moscow
- Date apprehended: 24 October 1977

Anatoly Nikolaevich Biryukov (Russian: Анатолий Николаевич Бирюков, 18 February 1939 – 24 February 1979), known as The Baby Hunter (Russian: Охотник за младенцами), was a Soviet serial killer convicted for the killing of five babies in the Moscow area between September and October 1977.

== Background ==
Anatoly Nikolaevich Biryukov was born on 18 February 1939 in Lopasnya, Moscow Oblast, RSFSR (present-day Chekhov, Moscow Oblast, Russia). His father, Nikolai Biryukov, had been decorated a Hero of the Soviet Union during World War II, and served as a General of the Soviet Army. Biryukov was married with children.

== Murders ==
Biryukov kidnapped and murdered his first victim on 16 September 1977, when he stole a stroller that had been left briefly unattended in front of an infant formula store on Marshal Biryuzov Street in Moscow. Later that day, the missing stroller was found empty and the baby was found dead in the hallway of an apartment building on the same street. Three days later Biryukov kidnapped his second victim, a three-month-old girl, when he seized a stroller in front of the Children's World store on Prospekt Mira. The authorities began to suspect that they had a possible serial perpetrator, and launched one of the largest operations in Moscow police history looking for the missing baby. On October 17, the body of Biryukov's second victim was found in a landfill near Mamyrov, a village on the outskirts of Moscow. She showed signs of having suffered sexual assault before death.

== Arrest and conviction ==
On 24 October 1977, Biryukov attempted a kidnapping in Chekhov, a city south of Moscow city in Moscow Oblast. In the aftermath of the attempt, he was chased after by citizens who later described him to the investigators, leading to Biryukov's arrest. Three additional infant victims are attributed to Biryukov, believed to have been committed before his arrest.

In 1978, Biryukov was sentenced to death for the five murders. Later while in detention, he attempted to commit suicide. The sentence was appealed to the Supreme Soviet of the RSFSR, but Biryukov was executed by firing squad on 24 February 1979.

The murders were the subject of episode 206, titled "Empty Stroller" (Russian: "пустая коляска"), of the NTV show "Следствие вели...". Participants included two eyewitnesses, the mother of one of the victims, two state investigators and Biryukov's defence attorney. According to the presenter of the NTV show, Leonid Kanevsky, the Soviet authorities avoided publicizing the Biryukov case in part because of the status of Biryukov's father, Nikolai Biryukov, a decorated army general and war hero.

== See also ==
- List of Russian serial killers
