= Vladislav Biryukov =

Russian journalist

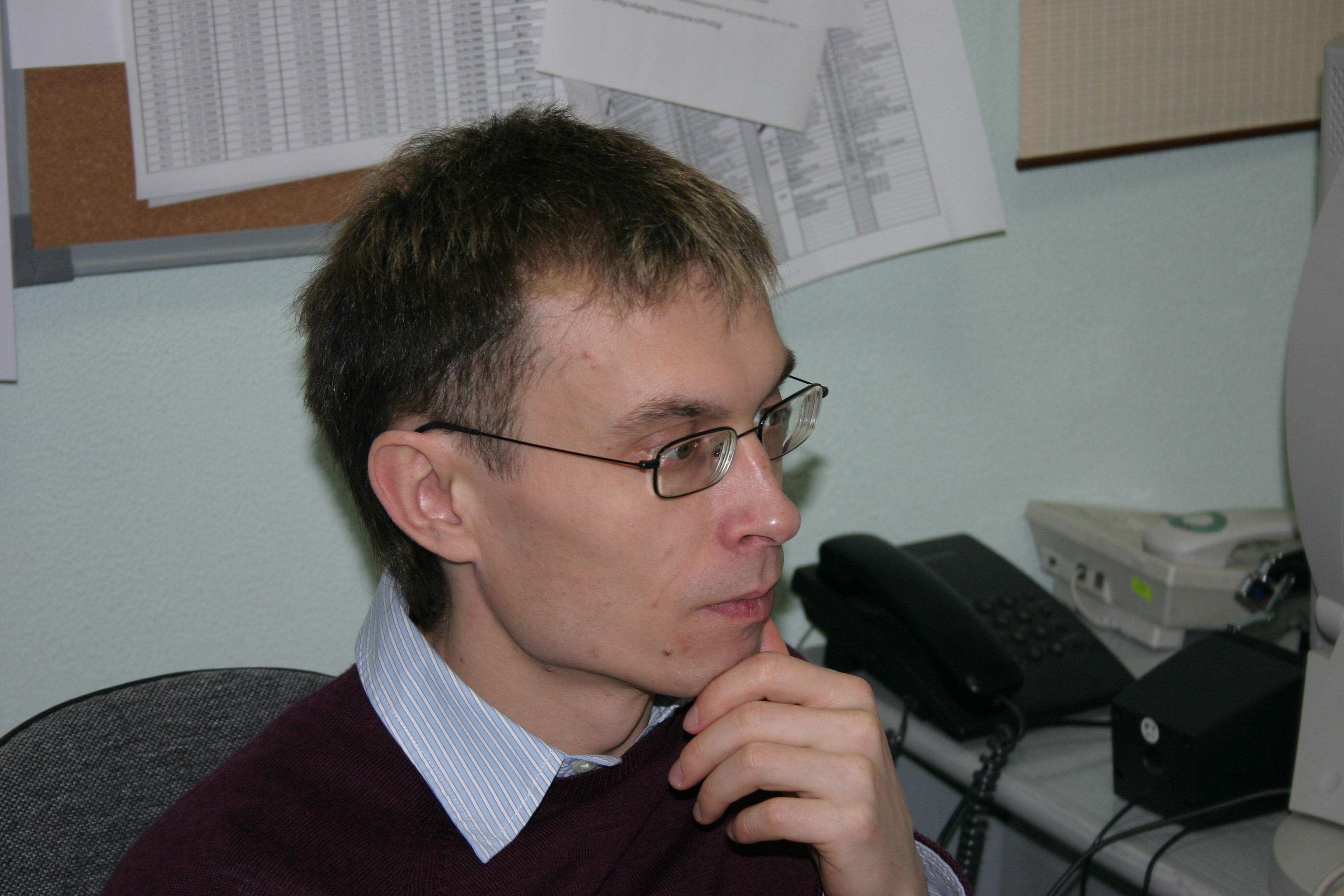
Vladislav Biryukov

Vladislav Vasilievich Biryukov (Russian: Владислав Васильевич Бирюков, born 15 September 1972), Russian mineralogist and journalist, editor-in-chief and an author of Computerra weekly.

== Biography ==
- 1989—1994 — studied at geologic facultet of Moscow State University
- since 1998 — prints in Computerra
- 1999—2008 — the head of news department in Computerra
- since 2008 — editor-in-chief of Computerra

Preceded by Vladimir Guriev	Editor-in-chief of Computerra; 2008—now	Succeeded by —
