= Training Center for Junior Specialists =

Kazakh Army training center

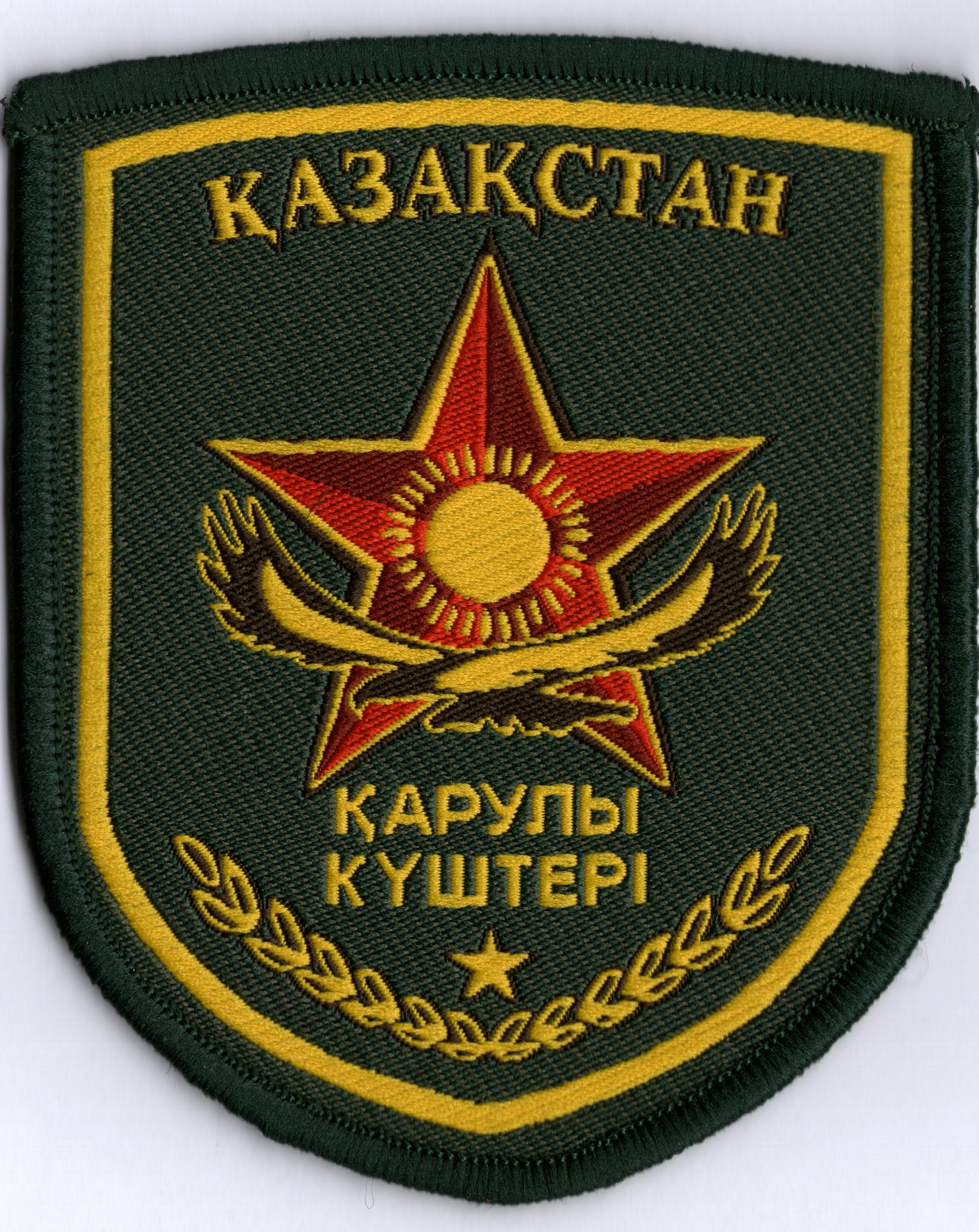
Patch of the Kazakh Ground Forces.

The Training Center for Junior Specialists of the Kazakh Ground Forces named after Karasai Batyr (Military Unit Number 30212) is a Ground Forces formation of the Armed Forces of the Republic of Kazakhstan.

During the Cold War it was a training formation of the Soviet Ground Forces. It was originally formed as the 80th Guards Rifle Division on 1 March 1943 from the second formation of the 298th Rifle Division after the Battle of Stalingrad. After which it remained in reserve until August, when it joined the 4th Guards Army, taking part in the Battle of the Dnieper, Korsun-Shevchenkovsky Offensive, and the Uman–Botoșani Offensive.

The division became part of the Central Group of Forces after the end of the war. On 1 November 1945, it was converted into the 16th Guards Mechanized Division, before relocating to Samarkand in the Turkestan Military District. On 11 January 1965, the division was renumbered as the 80th Guards, restoring its World War II designation. In May 1970, after the Central Asian Military District was formed, the 80th Guards Training Motor Rifle Division (Russian: 80-я гвардейская учебная мотострелковая дивизия) transferred to Otar-2 (renamed Gvardeysky) near Alma-Ata in Kazakhstan and became part of the new district. In 1987, the division was renamed the 210th Guards District Center when all training divisions became training centers. After the Dissolution of the Soviet Union, the center became part of the Kazakh Ground Forces in 1992.

== History ==
=== World War II ===
It was originally formed as the 80th Guards Rifle Division on 1 March 1943 from the second formation of the 298th Rifle Division in honor of the "exemplary fulfillment of combat missions" of the latter during the Battle of Stalingrad. The 886th, 888th, and 892nd Rifle Regiments became the 217th Guards, the 230th Guards, and the 232nd Guards, respectively; the 828th Artillery Regiment became the 171st Guards, and the rest of the division's units also became Guards units. The division remained in reserve, receiving reinforcements and reequipping, until early August, when it joined the 4th Guards Army, concentrated in the forests southwest of Stary Oskol. Between 8 and 13 August the 80th Guards moved forward to the front line at Grayvoron. In a period of two and a half months, the division marched around 1,000 kilometers (620 mi) at night. Joining the Voronezh Front, the 4th Guards Army was concentrated 20 kilometers (12 mi) east of Akhtyrka. During the Battle of the Dnieper, the troops of the front broke through the German lines at Akhtyrka and crossed the Vorskla River at Kuzmino. The army's 68th Guards Rifle Division captured Mikhailovka. After being pushed back, the German troops held positions on the line of Bilsk on the Kotelevka River, but began retreating on 22 September. In two days, the 80th Guards advanced 50 kilometers (31 mi) against the German rear guard, reaching positions west of Poltava.

In early October, the division, along with the rest of 21st Guards Rifle Corps, began crossing the Dnieper. The 80th Guards, under the command of Colonel A.E. Yakovlev, were tasked with the main crossing on the night of 5–6 October. The first to cross the river were soldiers of Colonel Pyotr Kamishnikov's 230th Guards Rifle Regiment's 3rd Battalion, under the command of Captain Nikolay Zaryanov. At 20:00 hours on 5 October, a submachine gun company led by Lieutenant Alexey Priglebov launched its boats from Koldovoy Island. The crossing was met by a hail of German fire, but the battalion managed to establish a bridgehead on the opposite bank. The bridgehead was reinforced and expanded despite multiple German counterattacks by the rest of the division; Zaryanov and Priglebov were made Heroes of the Soviet Union for their actions. By the morning of 6 October, the entire 230th Regiment was across the river, and the division continued its westward advance.

The division fought in the Korsun-Shevchenkovsky Offensive, encircling a German pocket, in January and February 1944. In the spring it helped capture Zvenigorodka, and on 5 March attacked at Olkhovets during the Uman–Botoșani Offensive, advancing through the mud of the spring rasputitsa. The division, alongside the rest of the army, opened a 35-kilometer (22 mi) penetration in the Axis line, and advanced west.

=== Postwar ===
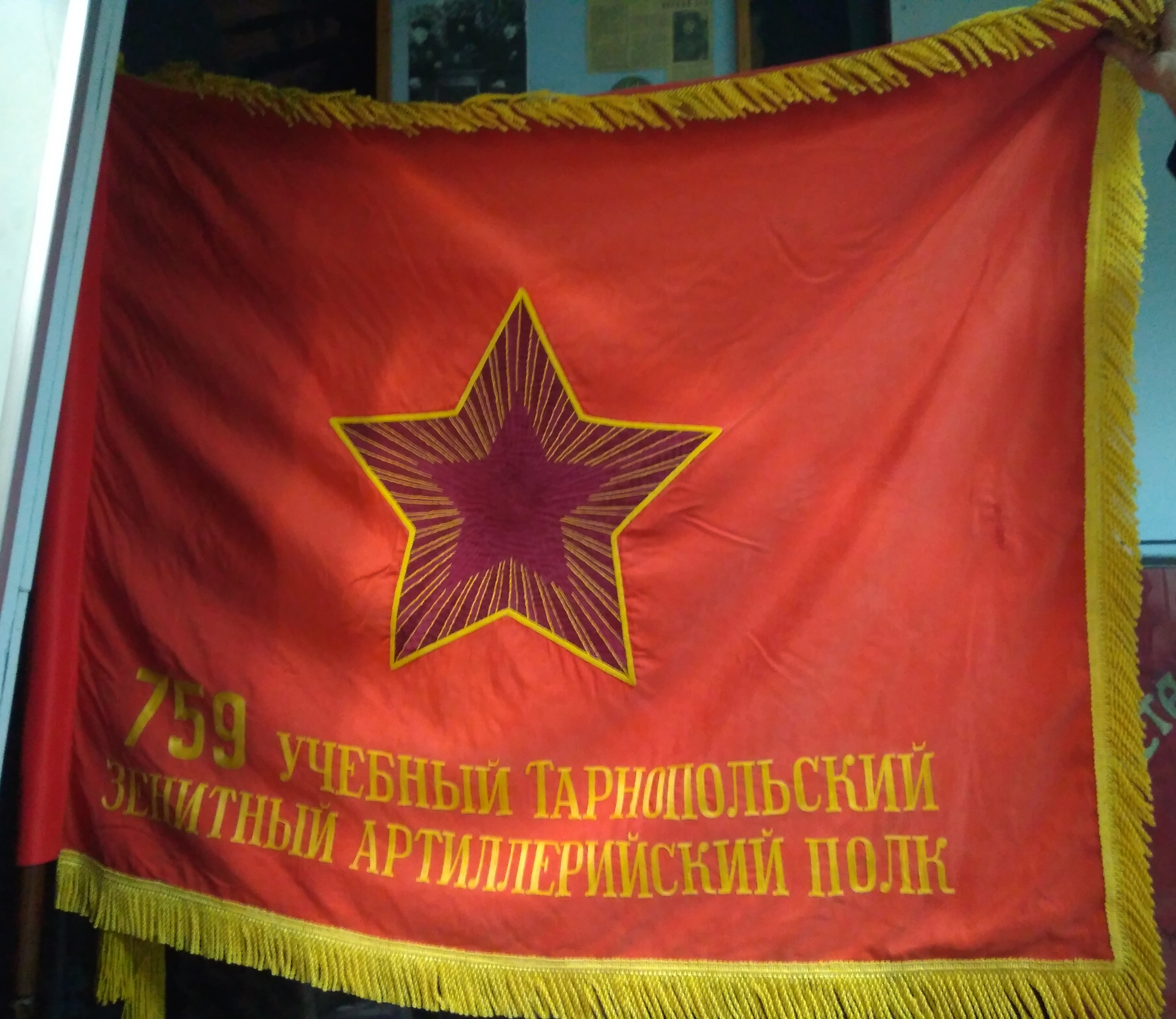
Battle flag of the 759th Training Anti-Aircraft Artillery Regiment of the 80th Guards Training Motor Rifle Division from its time serving in the Central Asian Military District.

The division, with the army's 20th Guards Rifle Corps, became part of the Central Group of Forces after the end of the war. On 1 November 1945, it was converted into the 16th Guards Mechanized Division, before relocating to Samarkand in the Turkestan Military District and becoming part of the 119th Rifle Corps. The 16th Guards included the 53rd, 54th, and 55th Guards Mechanized Regiments, as well as the 127th Guards and 13th Tank Regiments, the latter of which was disbanded. The 127th Guards were redesignated from the 98th Separate Tank Regiment on 29 June 1945 and joined the division on 1 November. After the division left for Samarkand, the regiment became separate again, but rejoined the 16th Guards in August 1949, replacing the 96th Tank Regiment. The 96th Tank Regiment was formed from the 96th Tank Brigade on 1 November, and briefly was part of the division, but later transferred to the 10th Mechanized Army before it was disbanded on 1 June 1946. The 13th Self-Propelled Heavy Tank Regiment was formed from the 27th Separate Tank Regiment on 1 November, disbanding in the spring of 1957.

The 53rd Guards were formed from the 217th Guards Rifle Regiment, the 54th Guards from the 230th, and the 55th Guards from the 232nd. Each mechanized regiment included a separate tank battalion: the 53rd Guards had the 127th Guards, the 54th Guards the 135th Guards, and the 55th Guards the 136th Guards. These battalions were converted into regular numbered battalions of the regiments in the fall of 1953. In September 1949, after the 119th became a mountain rifle corps, the division transferred to the newly formed 17th Rifle Corps. On 25 June 1957, it became the 90th Guards Motor Rifle Division. Around the same time, the corps became the 17th Army Corps. Its mechanized regiments became the 372nd, 54th, and 55th Guards Motor Rifle Regiments, respectively. The 90th Guards became the 90th Guards Training Motor Rifle Division on 24 May 1962, directly subordinated to the district headquarters. On 11 January 1965, the division was renumbered as the 80th Guards, restoring its World War II designation.

In May 1970, after the Central Asian Military District was formed, the 80th Guards transferred to Otar-2 (renamed Gvardeysky) near Alma-Ata in Kazakhstan and became part of the new district. Gvardeysky became a military townlet, housing the families of the division's personnel. In 1987, the division was renamed the 210th Guards District Center when all training divisions became training centers. The training center included the 55th Guards and 372nd Guards Training Motor Rifle Regiments, the 127th Guards Training Tank Regiment, the 171st Guards Training Artillery Regiment, and the 1289th Training Anti-Aircraft Artillery Regiment, all stationed at Gvardeysky. The center's 66th Training Motor Rifle Regiment was at Arys.

== Service in independent Kazakhstan ==
After the Dissolution of the Soviet Union, the center became part of the Kazakh Ground Forces in 1992. It was renamed the 210th Guards Training Center for Junior Specialists, and on 6 October 1998 received the honorific named for Karasai Batyr. It was eventually renamed the Training Center for Junior Specialists of the Kazakh Ground Forces named for Karasai Batyr (Military Unit Number 30212).
