= Yurii Biriukov =

Ukrainian businessman, politician, and military volunteer

Yurii Serhiiovych Biriukov
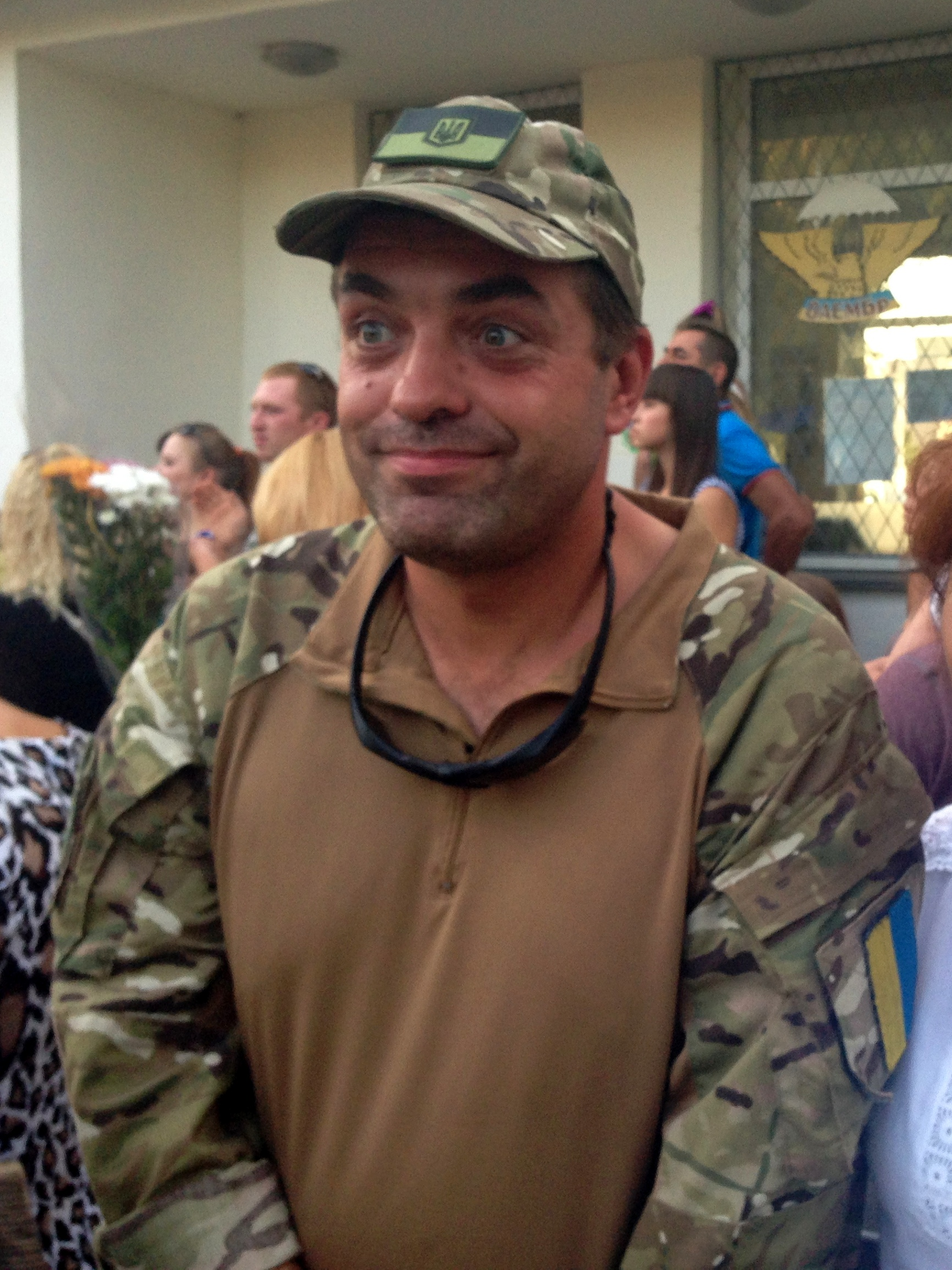
- Born: 24 October 1974 (age 51); Mykolaiv, Ukrainian SSR, Soviet Union
- Other name: Phoenix
- Citizenship: Ukraine
- Occupations: businessman, volunteer, presidential adviser, defense minister assistant
- Political party: European Solidarity
- Spouse: Tetiana Biriukova

Yurii Serhiiovych Biriukov also known as Phoenix (Ukrainian: Юрій Сергійович Бірюков; born 23 October 1974) is a Ukrainian businessman and politician who, through a group of Phoenix Wings volunteers, provided support to Ukrainian troops during the war in Donbas. He was an advisor to former President Petro Poroshenko (August 2014 to May 2019), and the Minister of Defense (October 2014 to 2019). He is a member of the Central Council and a member of the Presidium of the Central Council of the European Solidarity political party.

== Biography ==
From 1981 to 1991 he studied at the Mykolaiv school No. 22. He studied at the Dnipro Medical Institute, but did not graduate from it. In 1993, he passed the exams for admission to the National University of Kyiv-Mohyla Academy, but did not pass the entrance competition.

He lives in Kyiv since 1994. In 1996, he founded the company «Computer Zone», in 1999 he worked in the company «RIM2000». He worked in intensive care for many years. From 2012 to February 2014 he worked as a development director at the travel agency «Kuda Uhodno» and the director of its head office. He owns an IT business in the United States and an agricultural project in the Mykolaiv region.

From December 1, 2013, he took part in Euromaidan, was a volunteer doctor. In March 2014, he formed a group of Phoenix Wings volunteers to support the Ukrainian army after the 2014 Russian annexation of Crimea and continued to work with the start of the War in Donbas (in eastern Ukraine). On August 13, 2014, President of Ukraine Petro Poroshenko appointed Biryukov his advisor. On October 5, Biryukov was appointed Minister of Defense Valeriy Heletey Assistant for material support of the Armed Forces of Ukraine.

After his resignation, Heletey continued his work under the leadership of the new Minister Stepan Poltorak.

He is currently reforming the logistics of the armed forces and the procedure for mobilizing conscripts.

In February 2016, Biryukov headed the Mykolaiv regional organization of Petro Poroshenko Bloc.

On February 11, 2017, he was introduced to the Commission on State Awards and Heraldry.

On May 17, 2019, he was dismissed from the post of Adviser to the President of Ukraine at his own request.

Candidate for People's Deputies from the European Solidarity Party in the 2019 Ukrainian parliamentary election, No. 32 on the list. In this election European Solidarity won 23 seats on the nationwide party list and 2 constituency seats.

On May 31, 2019, he was elected to the presidium and central political council of European Solidarity.

On June 26, 2019, officers of the State Bureau of Investigation conducted a search of Yurii Biriukov's apartment related to the supply of supplies to the Ministry of Defense. European Solidarity considers these searches «cynical political pressure and undisguised political persecution». However, in July the director of the DBR, Roman Truba, stated that there were no complaints about the quality of the material support.

== Volunteering ==
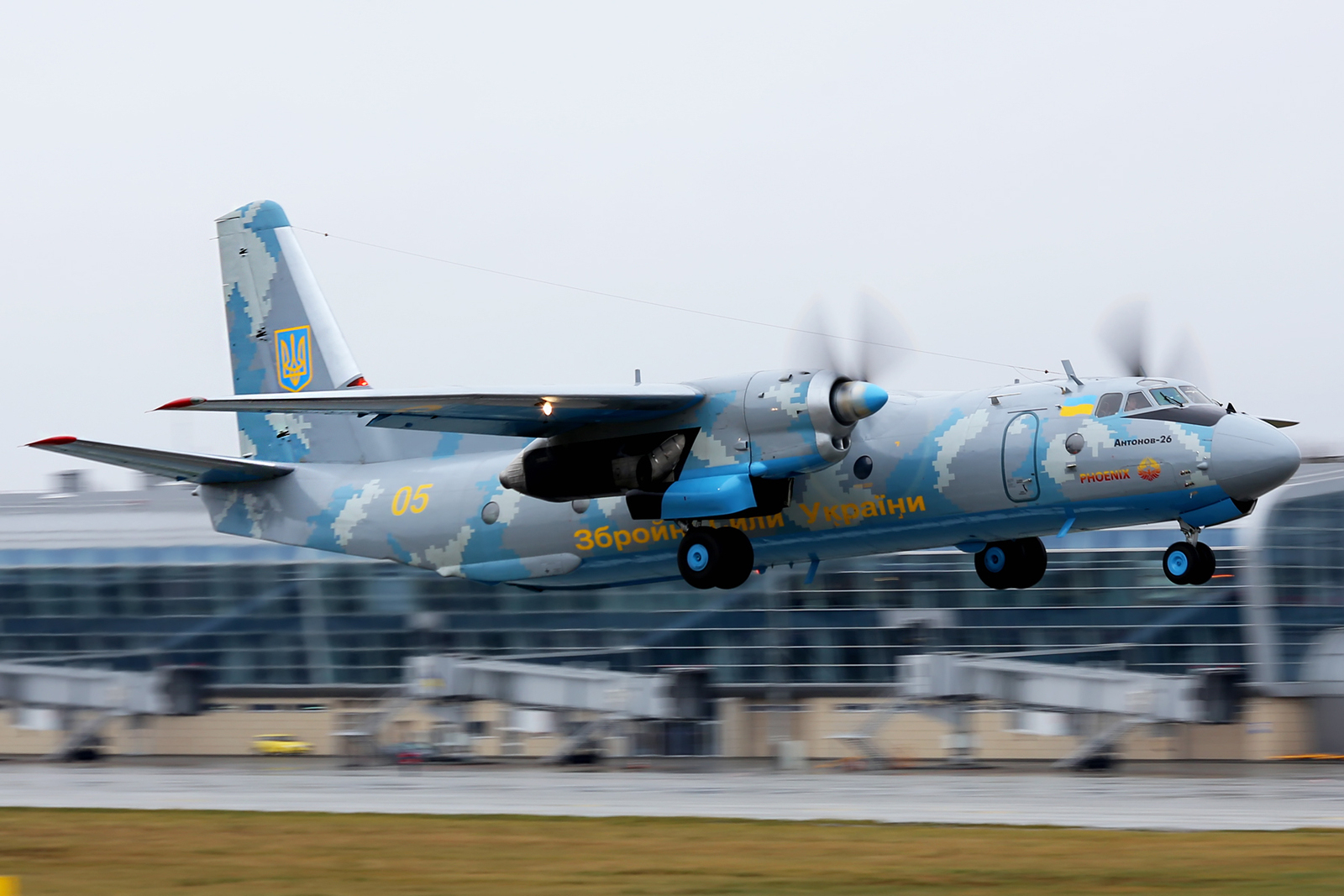
One of the An-26s restored using volunteer funds. The Phoenix Wings logo is visible behind the nose cone

After the Russian intervention in the Crimea and the beginning of the War in Donbas, Yurii Biriukov began to help the Ukrainian army. The group of Phoenix Wings volunteers he created purchased walkie-talkies, sleeping bags, bulletproof vests, and protective helmets. Biriukov organized the production of bulletproof vests, delivering more than two thousand bulletproof vests to the anti-terrorist operation zone in a month and a half. Also the Antonov An-26 plane was repaired with the means collected by group and the staff for engineering and technical personnel of crew near Mykolaiv was constructed.

Volunteers took care of the 72nd Mechanized Brigade, the 26th Artillery Brigade, the 25th Airborne Brigade, the 15th Transport Aviation Brigade, the 10th Saki Marine Aviation Brigade and the 79th Mykolaiv Airborne Brigade. Biriukov personally supervises the care of the latter. In August 2014, with the support of Biriukov, the 3rd Phoenix Volunteer Battalion was created at the 79th Airborne Brigade.

As of the beginning of July, Phoenix Wings had collected more than ₴10 million in donations. On average, the group received ₴250-300 thousand a day. Thanks to the help of Yurii Biriukov, on July 21, 2014, it was possible to remove 80 seriously wounded soldiers of the 79th separate airmobile brigade from the environment of terrorists in the Luhansk region. Also, he took part in the organization of return on August 8, 2014, of paratroopers of the 79th Airborne Brigade to Mykolaiv.

== Critique ==
In August 2016, Yurii Biriukov on his Facebook page spoke about the unreliability of 811 KRAZ cars of the General Ministry of Defense in the period from 2014 to 2015, which have already gained thousands of kilometers during the war, paying with the new Belarusian MAZ-Bogdan, which creates business partner of Petro Poroshenko, currently Oleh Gladkovsky is the First Deputy Secretary of the National Security and Defense Council of Ukraine. Prior to that, MAZ was established only in July 2016 and has no mileage in military conditions.

In addition, Yurii Biriukov falsely informed the public about the alleged constant delay in the delivery of KrAZ cars to the Ukrainian army.

Some journalists believe that Yurii Biriukov, by creating the Center for Development and Support of Logistics of the Armed Forces, headed by Dmytro Marchenko, monopolized the logistics of servicemen and destroyed the old system of security of the Armed Forces.

Secretary of the Verkhovna Rada Committee on National Security and Defense Ivan Vinnyk (European Solidarity deputy) accused Yurii Biriukov and a «volunteer landing party» of the Ministry of Defense of Ukraine of abusing the purchase of Arctic diesel fuel for the needs of the Ministry of Defense of Ukraine in March–April 2015. After considering the situation with public procurement of fuel in the Verkhovna Rada Committee on National Security and Defense, it became clear that officials from the «volunteer landing» facilitated the purchase of 30 thousand tons of diesel fuel at a price higher than 1.92 UAH/liter at retail prices. Traders themselves. On September 18, 2015, the Pechersk District Court opened a criminal case on this fact. According to Tetiana Chornovol, a member of the Verkhovna Rada Committee on National Security and Defense, only «Talanlegprom» won the tender during the purchase of boots (ankle boots) for the army, the sole design of which met exactly the stated technical conditions, and the price of each pair was 300 UAH above market.

== Private life ==
He is married to Tatiana Biriukova and has two children.

== Awards ==
- Order "For Merits" III degree (August 23, 2014) - for significant personal contribution to state building, socio-economic, scientific and technical, cultural and educational development of Ukraine, significant achievements and high professionalism
- Order of Bohdan Khmelnytskyi III degree (December 4, 2014) - for civic courage, significant personal contribution to the development of the volunteer movement, strengthening the defense and security of the Ukrainian state
