= List of rural localities in Volgograd Oblast =

Map of Russia with Volgograd Oblast highlighted

This is a list of rural localities in Volgograd Oblast. Volgograd Oblast (Russian: Волгогра́дская о́бласть, Volgogradskaya oblast) is a federal subject (an oblast) of Russia, located in the Volga region of Southern Russia. Its administrative center is Volgograd. The population of the oblast was 2,610,161 in the 2010 Census.

== Alexeyevsky District ==
Rural localities in Alexeyevsky District:

- Alexeyevskaya
- Andreyanovka
- Arepyev
- Arzhanovskaya
- Barminsky
- Bolshaya Tavolzhanka
- Bolshoy Babinsky
- Checherovsky
- Gushchinsky
- Isakiyevsky
- Kochkarinsky
- Krasinsky
- Krasny Oktyabr
- Kudinovsky
- Larinsky
- Lunyakinsky
- Mitkin
- Nesterovsky
- Olkhovsky
- Pimkinsky
- Plyos
- Podpesochny
- Poklonovsky
- Polyanovsky
- Pomalinsky
- Popov
- Rechensky
- Reshetovsky
- Ryabovsky
- Samolshinsky
- Serebryansky
- Sharashensky
- Sidorovka
- Skulyabinsky
- Solontsovsky
- Stanovsky
- Stezhensky
- Sukhovsky
- Titovsky
- Tryokhlozhinsky
- Ugolsky
- Ust-Buzulukskaya
- Yaminsky
- Yaminsky
- Yendovsky
- Yezhovka
- Zakharovsky
- Zotovskaya

== Bykovsky District ==
Rural localities in Bykovsky District:

- Alexandrovka
- Demidov
- Katrichev
- Krasnye Zori
- Lugovaya Proleyka
- Molodyozhny
- Nizhny Balykley
- Primorsk
- Sadovoye
- Verkhny Balykley
- Zavolzhsky
- Zelyony

== Chernyshkovsky District ==
Rural localities in Chernyshkovsky District:

- Akolzin
- Alyoshkin
- Aseyev
- Basakin
- Baznoy
- Biryukov
- Bogomazovka
- Bolsheternovoy
- Cherkomasyev
- Filatov
- Firsovka
- Gladkov
- Komarov
- Krasnoyarsky
- Krasny Bogdan
- Krasny
- Lagutin
- Loznoy
- Makarovsky
- Maloternovoy
- Minayev
- Morskoy
- Nizhnegnutov
- Nizhnyaya Verbovka
- Nizyanka
- Parshino
- Popov
- Pristenovsky
- Razdolny
- Rossoshansky
- Sizov
- Sokolov
- Tormosin
- Verkhnegnutov
- Verlhnetsimlyansky
- Vodyanovsky
- Volotsky
- Vorobyov
- Yarskoy
- Yolkino
- Zakharov
- Zhuravka

== Danilovsky District ==
Rural localities in Danilovsky District:

- Atamanovka
- Belye Prudy
- Beryozovskaya
- Bobry
- Chernorechensky
- Dorozhkin
- Filin
- Gonchary
- Gorin
- Gryaznukha
- Kamennochernovsky
- Kamenny
- Kiyevsky
- Krasny
- Kuvshinov
- Loboykovo
- Lovyagin
- Medvedevo
- Miusovo
- Orekhovo
- Ostrovskaya
- Petrushi
- Plotnikov 1-y
- Popov
- Profsoyuznik
- Prydki
- Rogachi
- Semibratovsky
- Sergiyevskaya
- Tarasov
- Velichkin
- Zaplavka
- Zapolyansky

== Dubovsky District ==
Rural localities in Dubovsky District:

- Boykiye Dvoriki
- Chelyuskinets
- Davydovka
- Gornaya Proleyka
- Gornovodyanoye
- Gorny Balykley
- Karavayinka
- Loznoye
- Malaya Ivanovka
- Olenye
- Peskovatka
- Petropavlovka
- Pichuga
- Pochta
- Polunino
- Pryamaya Balka
- Rasstrigin
- Rodniki
- Sadki
- Semyonovka
- Spartak
- Strelnoshirokoye
- Suvodskaya
- Ust-Pogozhye
- Varkino

== Frolovsky District ==
Rural localities in Frolovsky District:

- Archedino-Chernushinsky
- Banny
- Blagodatny
- Dudachensky
- Kolobrodov
- Kudinovsky
- Lychak
- Malodelskaya
- Mansky
- Muravli
- Nizhniye Lipki
- Parizhskaya Kommuna
- Prigorodny
- Rubyozhny
- Russko-Osinovsky
- Shkolny
- Shlyakhovsky
- Zimovsky

== Gorodishchensky District ==
Rural localities in Gorodishchensky District:

- Borodino
- Donskoy
- Grachi
- Kamenny
- Karpovka
- Konny
- Kotluban
- Krasny Pakhar
- Kuzmichi
- Novaya Nadezhda
- Orlovka
- Panshino
- Peskovatka
- Posyolok Oblastnoy selskokhozyaystvennoy opytnoy stantsii
- Rossoshka
- Sady Pridonya
- Sakarka
- Samofalovka
- Stepnoy
- Studyono-Yablonovka
- Tsaritsyn
- Varlamov
- Vertyachy
- Vinovka
- Zapadnovka

== Ilovlinsky District ==
Rural localities in Ilovlinsky District:

- Alexandrovka
- Alikovka
- Avilov
- Baybayev
- Beluzhino-Koldairov
- Berdiya
- Bolshaya Ivanovka
- Borovki
- Chernozubovka
- Fastov
- Golensky
- Kachalino
- Kachalinskaya
- Kamensky
- Kamyshinsky
- Khmelevskoy
- Kolotsky
- Kondrashi
- Krasnodonsky
- Krasnoyarsky
- Kuznetsov
- Log
- Medvedev
- Nizhnegerasimovsky
- Novogrigoryevskaya
- Obilny
- Ozerki
- Peschanka
- Pisaryovka
- Rassvet
- Shirokov
- Shiryayevsky
- Shokhinsky
- Sirotinskaya
- Solodcha
- Starodonskoy
- Starogrigoryevskaya
- Tary
- Traktirsky
- Tryokhostrovskaya
- Viltov
- Yablochny
- Yablonsky
- Yeretsky
- Zavarygin
- Zheltukhin
- Zheltukhino-Shiryaysky
- Zimoveysky

== Kalachyovsky District ==
Rural localities in Kalachyovsky District:

- Beloglinsky
- Bereslavka
- Bolshenabatovsky
- Bratsky
- Buzinovka
- Dalny
- Dom otdykha
- Donskoy
- Golubinskaya
- Golubinsky 2-y
- Gremyachy
- Ilyevka
- Kamyshi
- Kolpachki
- Komsomolsky
- Krepinsky
- Kumovka
- Logovsky
- Lozhki
- Lyapichev
- Malogolubinsky
- Marinovka
- Morskoy
- Novolyapichev
- Novopetrovsky
- Oktyabrsky
- Osinovsky
- Ovrazhny
- Parkhomenko
- Patiizbyansky
- Pervomaysky
- Posyolok otdeleniya 2 sovkhoza Volgo-Don
- Prikanalny
- Primorsky
- Prudboy
- Pyatimorsk
- Ryumino-Krasnoyarsky
- Stepanevka
- Stepnoy
- Svetly Log
- Tikhonovka
- Verbovsky
- Volgodonskoy
- Yarki-Rubezhny
- Zarya

== Kamyshinsky District ==
Rural localities in Kamyshinsky District:

- Alexandrovka
- Antipovka
- Avilovsky
- Baranovka
- Belogorki
- Butkovka
- Chukhonastovka
- Dubovka
- Dvoryanskoye
- Galka
- Gosselekstantsiya
- Gryaznukha
- Guselka
- Ionov
- Kalinovka
- Karpunin
- Kostarevo
- Lebyazhye
- Michurinsky
- Nagorny
- Nizhnyaya Dobrinka
- Nizhnyaya Lipovka
- Panovka
- Petrunino
- Popovka
- Posyolok fermy 3 sovkhoza Dobrinsky
- Salomatino
- Semyonovka
- Shcherbakovka
- Shcherbatovka
- Srednyaya Kamyshinka
- Talovka
- Ternovka
- Tikhomirovka
- Torpovka
- Umet
- Ust-Gryaznukha
- Verkhnyaya Dobrinka
- Verkhnyaya Gryaznukha
- Verkhnyaya Kulaninka
- Verkhnyaya Lipovka
- Veselovo
- Vikhlyantsevo
- Vodnobuyerachnoye
- Yelshanka

== Kikvidzensky District ==
Rural localities in Kikvidzensky District:

- Alexandrovka
- Alontsevo
- Astakhov
- Besov
- Bezrechny
- Budyonny
- Chernolagutinsky
- Chistopol
- Dalnestepnoy
- Dubrovsky
- Gordeyevsky
- Grishin
- Kalachevsky
- Kalinovsky
- Kazarino
- Krutoy Log
- Kuzkin
- Lapin
- Lestyukhin
- Machekha
- Marchukovsky
- Mikhaylovka
- Mordvintsevo
- Mozgly
- Ozerki
- Peschanovka
- Preobrazhenskaya
- Rasstrigin
- Semyonovka
- Shiryayevsky
- Strakhov
- Uvarovka
- Yezhovka
- Zavyazka

== Kletsky District ==
Rural localities in Kletsky District:

- Bolshaya Doshchinka
- Bolshaya Osinovka
- Borisov
- Gvardeysky
- Ivanushensky
- Kalmykovsky
- Karazhensky
- Kazachy
- Kletskaya
- Koponya
- Kremenskaya
- Kurganny
- Lipovsky
- Logovsky
- Maksari
- Malaya Donshchinka
- Malaya Osinovka
- Manoylin
- Mayorovsky
- Melokletsky
- Mukovnin
- Nizhnyaya Buzinovka
- Novotsaritsynsky
- Orekhov
- Perekopka
- Perekopskaya
- Perelazovsky
- Platonov
- Podnizhny
- Raspopinskaya
- Saushkin
- Selivanov
- Ternovoy
- Ventsy
- Verkhnecherensky
- Verkhnyaya Buzinovka
- Yerik
- Yevstratovsky
- Zakharov
- Zhirkovsky
- Zotovsky

== Kotelnikovsky District ==
Rural localities in Kotelnikovsky District:

- Budarka
- Chiganaki
- Chilekovo
- Darganov
- Dorofeyevsky
- Generalovsky
- Gremyachaya
- Karayichev
- Kotelnikov
- Krasnoyarsky
- Lenina
- Mayorovsky
- Nagavskaya
- Nagolny
- Nebykov
- Nizhneyablochny
- Nizhniye Cherni
- Pimeno-Cherni
- Pokhlyobin
- Poperechny
- Primorsky
- Pugachyovskaya
- Rassvet
- Ravninny
- Safronov
- Sazonov
- Semichny
- Ternovoy
- Vasilyevsky
- Verkhneyablochny
- Vesyoly
- Vypasnoy
- Zakharov

== Kotovsky District ==
Rural localities in Kotovsky District:

- Avilovo
- Burluk
- Doroshevo
- Gordiyenki
- Korostino
- Kryachki
- Kuptsovo
- Lapshinskaya
- Lobynets
- Miroshniki
- Moiseyevo
- Mokraya Olkhovka
- Netkachevo
- Nizhniye Korobki
- Novoalexeyevka
- Novonikolayevka
- Pereshchepnoye
- Plemkhoz
- Popki
- Romanov
- Slyusarevo
- Smorodino
- Sosnovka
- Tarasovo
- Yefimovka

== Kumylzhensky District ==
Rural localities in Kumylzhensky District:

- Andreyanovsky
- Belenky
- Belogorsky
- Blinkovsky
- Blizhny
- Bukanovskaya
- Bukanovskoye Zagotzerno
- Chiganaki 1-ye
- Chiganaki 2-ye
- Chunosovsky
- Dubovsky
- Fedoseyevskaya
- Filin
- Filyaty
- Galkin
- Glushitsa
- Golovsky
- Grishinsky
- Ilmenevsky
- Kalinin
- Klyuchi
- Kosoklyuchansky
- Kozlov
- Kraptsovsky
- Krasnoarmeysky
- Krasnopolov
- Krasnyansky
- Krutoy
- Kuchurovsky
- Kumylzhenskaya
- Kuznechinsky
- Lisinsky
- Lyalinsky
- Lyubishensky
- Mitkin
- Nikitinsky
- Oblivsky
- Olkhovsky
- Ostroukhov
- Podkovsky
- Pokruchinsky
- Popov
- Potapovsky
- Pustovsky
- Rodionovsky
- Samoylovsky
- Sarychevsky
- Sedov
- Shakin
- Sigayevsky
- Siskovsky
- Skurishenskaya
- Slashchyovskaya
- Sulyayevsky
- Tochilkin
- Tyurinsky
- Yarskoy 1-y
- Yarskoy 2-y
- Yelansky
- Yendovsky
- Zaolkhovsky
- Zatalovsky
- Zhukovsky
- Zhukovsky

== Leninsky District ==
Rural localities in Leninsky District:

- Bakhtiyarovka
- Bulgakov
- Dolgy
- Glukhoy
- Gornaya Polyana
- Karshevitoye
- Kolobovka
- Kommunar
- Konovalov
- Kovylny
- Leshchev
- Leskhoz 5-y
- Malyayevka
- Mayak Oktyabrya
- Nadezhdin
- Novostroyka
- Pokrovka
- Put Ilyicha
- Rassvet
- Saray
- Solodovka
- Stepana Razina
- Stepnoy
- Traktorostroy
- Tsarev
- Vosmoye Marta
- Zaplavnoye
- Zarya
- Zubarevka

== Mikhaylovka Urban Okrug ==
Rural localities in Mikhaylovka Urban Okrug:

- Abramov
- Archedinskaya
- Bezymyanka
- Bolshaya Glushitsa
- Bolshemedvedevsky
- Bolshoy Oreshkin
- Bolshoy
- Burov
- Cheremukhov
- Demochkin
- Frolov
- Glinishche
- Grishin
- Gurovo
- Ilmensky 1-y
- Ilmensky 2-y
- Karagichevsky
- Katasonov
- Knyazhensky 1-y
- Knyazhensky 2-y
- Krutinsky
- Kukushkino
- Kurin
- Malomedvedevsky
- Maly Oreshkin
- Mishin
- Mokhovsky
- Orly
- Otradnoye
- Otruba
- Plotnikov 2-y
- Poddubny
- Prudki
- Razdory
- Rekonstruktsiya
- Rogozhin
- Sekachi
- Semenovod
- Senichkin
- Sennoy
- Sidory
- Starorechensky
- Staroselye
- Stoylovsky
- Strakhovsky
- Subbotin
- Sukhov 1-y
- Sukhov 2-y
- Tishanka
- Troitsky
- Vesyoly
- Yeterevskaya
- Zapolosny
- Zinovyev

== Nekhayevsky District ==
Rural localities in Nekhayevsky District:

- Artanovsky
- Avraamovsky
- Buratsky
- Denisovsky
- Dinamo
- Dryaglovsky
- Dyakonovsky
- Kamensky
- Karaichevsky
- Khoroshensky
- Krasnopolye
- Krasnovsky
- Kruglovka
- Kulichki
- Kuzminka
- Lobachevsky
- Lukovskaya
- Makhiny
- Markovsky
- Mazinsky
- Melovsky
- Mirny
- Nekhayevskaya
- Nizhnedolgovsky
- Nizhnerechensky
- Olkhovsky
- Ostryakovsky
- Pankinsky
- Pavlovsky
- Pervomaysky
- Potaynoy
- Rodnichki
- Sokolovsky
- Solonka
- Sukhovsky 1-y
- Sychevsky
- Tishanskaya
- Tushkanovsky
- Upornikovskaya
- Uspenka
- Verkhnerechensky
- Zakhopyorsky

== Nikolayevsky District ==
Rural localities in Nikolayevsky District:

- Baranovka
- Berezhnovka
- Brigady 2
- Brigady 3
- Chkalov
- Dobrinka
- Iskra
- Komsomolets
- Krasnaya Znamya
- Krasny Meliorator
- Kumysolechebnitsa
- Leninets
- Leninskoye
- Levchunovka
- Libknekhta
- Novy Byt
- Ochkurovka
- Oroshayemy
- Peski
- Pioner
- Piramidalny
- Politotdelskoye
- Put Ilyicha
- Razdolnoye
- Rulevoy
- Solodushino
- Stepnovsky
- Talovka
- Torgunsky
- Tselinny
- Zavolzhsky

== Novoanninsky District ==
Rural localities in Novoanninsky District:

- Alimov-Lyubimovsky
- Alsyapinsky
- Amochayevsky
- Atamanovsky
- Beryozovka 1-ya
- Beryozovka 2-ya
- Bocharovsky
- Bolshoy Dubovsky
- Bolshoy Golovsky
- Borisovsky
- Budennovsky
- Burnatsky
- Chelyshevsky
- Cherkesovsky
- Deminsky
- Drobyazkin
- Durnovsky
- Filonovskaya
- Galushkinsky
- Goslesopitomnik
- Gulyayevsky
- Ivanovsky
- Karpovsky
- Kirpichyovsky
- Kleymenovsky
- Kosovsky
- Kozlinovsky
- Krasnaya Zarya
- Krasnogorsky
- Krasnokorotkovsky
- Kuznetsovsky
- Makhinovsky
- Maly Dubovsky
- Martynovsky
- Novokiyevka
- Novoselsky
- Panfilovo
- Pereshchepnovsky
- Polevoy
- Poltavsky
- Popov
- Popovsky
- Posyolok Uchkhoza Novoanninskogo Selkhoztekhnikuma
- Posyolok otdeleniya 1 sovkhoza AMO
- Posyolok otdeleniya 2 sovkhoza AMO
- Posyolok sovkhoza AMO
- Pyshkinsky
- Rodnikovsky
- Rog-Izmaylovsky
- Rogachev
- Rozhnovsky
- Salomatin
- Satarovsky
- Staroanninskaya
- Strakhovsky
- Talovsky
- Tavolzhansky
- Trostyansky
- Troyetsky
- Trud-Rassvet
- Udodovsky
- Verbochny
- Vesyoly
- Vikhlyayevsky
- Vostochny
- Yaryzhensky
- Yastrebovsky
- Zaprudny
- Zvyozdka

== Novonikolayevsky District ==
Rural localities in Novonikolayevsky District:

- Aksenov
- Aleksikovsky
- Andreyevsky
- Andrianovsky
- Baklanovsky
- Belorechensky
- Chigari
- Chulinsky
- Duplyatsky
- Dvoynovsky
- Fominsky
- Gosplodopitomnik
- Grachi
- Grudne-Yermaki
- Kamenka
- Khopyorsky
- Kikvidze
- Kirkhinsky
- Kleyevsky
- Komsomolsky
- Korolevsky
- Krasnoarmeysky
- Krasnoluchensky
- Krasnostanovsky
- Kulikovsky
- Kupava
- Kuznetsovsky
- Lashchenovsky
- Lazorevsky
- Mirny
- Mironovsky
- Nikolayevsky
- Nizhnekardailsky
- Nizhnezubrilovsky
- Novoberezovsky
- Novokardailsky
- Orlovsky
- Priovrazhny
- Prutskovsky
- Ruzheynikovsky
- Sapozhok
- Serp i Molot
- Skvorsovsky
- Stepnoy
- Verkhnekardailsky
- Verkhnezubrilovsky

== Oktyabrsky District ==
Rural localities in Oktyabrsky District:

- Abganerovo
- Aksay
- Antonov
- Chernomorovsky
- Chikov
- Goncharovka
- Gromoslavka
- Ilmen-Suvorovsky
- Ivanovka
- Kamenka
- Kapkinka
- Kovalyovka
- Molokanovsky
- Nizhnekumsky
- Novoaksaysky
- Novoromashkin
- Peregruznoye
- Samokhino
- Shebalino
- Shelestovo
- Sovetsky
- Tikhy
- Vasilyevka
- Verkhnekumsky
- Verkhnerubezhny
- Vodino
- Vodyansky
- Zalivsky
- Zhutovo 1-ye
- Zhutovo 2-ye

== Olkhovsky District ==
Rural localities in Olkhovsky District:

- Dmitriyevka
- Goskonyushnya
- Gurovo
- Gusyovka
- Kamenny Brod
- Kireyevo
- Klinovka
- Lipovka
- Mikhaylovka
- Nezhinsky
- Novoolkhovka
- Novorossiyskoye
- Oktyabrsky
- Olkhovka
- Peskovatsky
- Pogozhya Balka
- Razuvayev
- Romanovka
- Rybinka
- Shchepkin
- Solodcha
- Stefanidovka
- Studyonovka
- Tishinka
- Yagodnoye
- Zaburunny
- Zakharovka
- Zanzevatka

== Pallasovsky District ==
Rural localities in Pallasovsky District:

- Bolshoy Simkin
- Chernyshev
- Elton
- Gonchary
- Gormaki
- Kalashniki
- Kalinina
- Kamyshovka
- Karabidayevka
- Karpov
- Kaysatskoye
- Khudushny
- Kobzev
- Komsomolsky
- Korolyovka
- Krasny Oktyabr
- Kulikov
- Kumysolechebnitsa
- Limanny
- Lisunovo
- Maximovka
- Novaya Ivantsovka
- Novostroyka
- Novy
- Otgonny
- Prigarino
- Priozerny
- Prudentov
- Put Ilyicha
- Romanenko
- Romashki
- Sadchikov
- Sakharovka
- Sapunkov
- Savinka
- Segorodsky
- Selyanka
- Smychka
- Staraya Balka
- Staraya Ivantsovka
- Vengelovka
- Vishnevka
- Yershov
- Yesin
- Zalivnoy
- Zavolzhsky
- Zheleznodorozhny razyezd 299
- Zheleznodorozhny razyezd 324
- Zheleznodorozhny razyezd 332
- Zholobov
- Zolotari
- Zyoleny

== Rudnyansky District ==
Rural localities in Rudnyansky District:

- Barannikovo
- Berezovka
- Bolshoye Sudachye
- Borodayevka
- Gromki
- Ilmen
- Kozlovka
- Krutoye
- Lemeshkino
- Lopukhovka
- Maloye Matyshevo
- Matyshevo
- Matyshevo
- Mityakino
- Novokrasino
- Novy Kondal
- Osichki
- Podkuykovo
- Razlivka
- Russkaya Bundevka
- Sadovy
- Sosnovka
- Stary Kondal
- Tersinka
- Ushinka
- Yagodny
- Yegorovka-na-Medveditse

== Serafimovichsky District ==
Rural localities in Serafimovichsky District:

- Bazki
- Beryozki
- Blinovsky
- Bobrovsky 1-y
- Bobrovsky 2-y
- Bolshoy
- Buyerak-Popovsky
- Buyerak-Senyutkin
- Chebotarevsky
- Chernopolyansky
- Chumakov
- Druzhilinsky
- Fomikhinsky
- Glubokovsky
- Gorbatovsky
- Grushin
- Gryazinovsky
- Gryaznushkin
- Ignatov
- Izbushensky
- Karagichev
- Kepinsky
- Khokhlachev
- Khovansky
- Kireyevsky
- Kletsko-Pochtovsky
- Korotovsky
- Kotovsky
- Kozinovsky
- Krutovsky
- Kundryuchkin
- Lastushinsky
- Lebyazhy
- Malakhov
- Minayevsky
- Mostovsky
- Nikulichev
- Nizhnyanka
- Novoalexandrovsky
- Novopavlovsky
- Orlinovsky
- Otrozhki
- Perepolsky
- Peschany
- Pichugin
- Pimkin
- Podgorny
- Podolkhovsky
- Podpeshinsky
- Poselsky
- Posyolok otdeleniya 2 sovkhoza Ust-Medveditsky
- Posyolok otdeleniya 3 sovkhoza Ust-Medveditsky
- Prilipkinsky
- Pronin
- Rubashkin
- Rybny
- Sebryakov
- Srednetsaritsynsky
- Starosenyutkin
- Terkin
- Tryasinovsky
- Tyukovnoy
- Ugolsky
- Ust-Khopyorskaya
- Varlamov
- Yagodny
- Yendovsky
- Zatonsky
- Zimnyatsky
- Zimovnoy

== Sredneakhtubinsky District ==
Rural localities in Sredneakhtubinsky District:

- Bulgakov
- Burkovsky
- Chapayevets
- Gospitomnik
- Kalinina
- Kashirin
- Kilyakovka
- Kirovets
- Kletsky
- Kochetkovo
- Kolkhoznaya Akhtuba
- Krasny Buksir
- Krasny Oktyabr
- Krasny Partizan
- Krasny Sad
- Krasny
- Krivusha
- Kuybyshev
- Lebyazhya Polyana
- Maksima Gorkogo
- Maksima Gorkogo
- Maslovo
- Nevidimka
- Novenky
- Pervomaysky
- Peschanka
- Plamenka
- Prikanalny
- Pryshchevka
- Rakhinka
- Repino
- Rybachy
- Rybovodny
- Sakharny
- Shchuchy
- Shumrovaty
- Stakhanovets
- Standartny
- Starenky
- Sukhodol
- Talovy
- Trety Reshayushchy
- Tretya Karta
- Tumak
- Tutov
- Tyrly
- Veliky Oktyabr
- Verkhnepogromnoye
- Volzhanka
- Vondo
- Vosmoye Marta
- Vtoraya Pyatiletka
- Vyazovka
- Yamy
- Zakutsky
- Zayar
- Zonalny
- Zvyozdny

== Staropoltavsky District ==
Rural localities in Staropoltavsky District:

- Belokamenka
- Belyayevka
- Bolshiye Prudy
- Cherebayevo
- Fermy 2 plemzavoda Parizhskaya Kommuna
- Fermy 2 sovkhoza Vodyanovsky
- Gmelinka
- Ilovatka
- Kalinino
- Kano
- Kharkovka
- Kolyshkino
- Korshunovka
- Kozhushkino
- Krasny Yar
- Kurnayevka
- Lyatoshinka
- Melovoy
- Nizhnyaya Vodyanka
- Novaya Kvasnikovka
- Novaya Poltavka
- Novy Tikhonov
- Orlinoye
- Pervomaysky
- Peschanka
- Posevnoy
- Posyolok Valuyevskoy Opytno-Meliorativnoy Stantsii
- Saltovo
- Shpaki
- Staraya Poltavka
- Suyetinovka
- Torgun
- Tsvetochnoye
- Valuyevka
- Verbny
- Verkhny Yeruslan
- Verkhnyaya Vodyanka
- Zheleznodorozhny razyezd 1062

== Surovikinsky District ==
Rural localities in Surovikinsky District:

- Blizhnemelnichny
- Blizhneosinovsky
- Blizhnepodgorsky
- Buratsky
- Chuvilevsky
- Dobrinka
- Dom Otdykha 40 let Oktyabrya
- Kachalin
- Kiselev
- Lobakin
- Lysov
- Mayorovsky
- Nizhneosinovsky
- Nizhnesolonovsky
- Nizhny Chir
- Novoderbenovsky
- Novomaximovsky
- Ostrov
- Ostrovskoy
- Peshcherovsky
- Plesistovsky
- Pogodin
- Popov 1-y
- Popov 2-y
- Posyolok otdeleniya 2 sovkhoza Krasnaya Zvezda
- Posyolok otdeleniya 3 sovkhoza Krasnaya Zvezda
- Rychkovsky
- Savinsky
- Sinyapkinsky
- Skvorin
- Starikovsky
- Staroderbenovsky
- Sukhanovsky
- Suvorovskaya
- Sviridovsky
- Sysoyevsky
- Verkhneaksyonovsky
- Verkhnechirsky
- Verkhneosinovsky
- Verkhnesolonovsky
- Yablonevy
- Zhirkovsky
- Zryanin

== Svetloyarsky District ==
Rural localities in Svetloyarsky District:

- Abganerovo
- Barbashi
- Bolshiye Chapurniki
- Chapurniki
- Chervlyonoye
- Dubovoye
- Dubovy Ovrag
- Gromki
- Ivanovka
- Kanalnaya
- Kirova
- Krasnoflotsky
- Krasnopartizansky
- Lugovoy
- Malye Chapurniki
- Nariman
- Novosad
- Privolny
- Privolzhsky
- Prudovy
- Raygorod
- Sadovy
- Severny
- Solyanka
- Tinguta
- Trudolyubiye
- Tsatsa

== Uryupinsky District ==
Rural localities in Uryupinsky District:

- Abroskinsky
- Akchernsky
- Akishin
- Astakhovsky
- Baltinovsky
- Belogorsky
- Bespalovsky
- Besplemyanovsky
- Bolshinsky
- Bryansky
- Bubnovsky
- Bugrovsky
- Bulekovsky
- Cherkassky
- Chumakovsky
- Dobrinka
- Dolgovsky
- Dolgy
- Dubovsky
- Dubrovsky
- Dyakonovsky 1-y
- Dyakonovsky 2-y
- Fedotovsky
- Firsovsky
- Glinkovsky
- Golovsky
- Gorsko-Popovsky
- Gorsky
- Grigoryevsky
- Gromlenovsky
- Iskra
- Kamenka
- Kolesniki
- Kotovsky
- Krasny
- Krasnyansky
- Krepovsky
- Kriushinsky
- Krivovsky
- Kudryashyovsky
- Kukhtinsky
- Loshchinovsky
- Luchnovsky
- Lysogorsky
- Makarovsky
- Mikhaylovskaya
- Mokhovskoy
- Nizhneantoshinsky
- Nizhnebezymyansky
- Nizhnekrasnyansky
- Nizhnesoinsky
- Nizhnetseplyayevsky
- Okladnensky
- Olkhovsky
- Olkhovsky
- Olshanka
- Osipovsky
- Pervomaysky
- Petrovsky
- Podgorinsky
- Podsosensky
- Popov
- Provotorovsky
- Rossoshinsky
- Rozovsky
- Rzhavsky
- Sadkovsky
- Safonovsky
- Saltynsky
- Santyrsky
- Sazonovsky
- Serkovsky
- Serkovsky
- Shemyakinsky
- Skabelinsky
- Stepnoy
- Studyonovsky
- Sychevsky
- Tepikinskaya
- Topolyovsky
- Uchkhoz
- Ukrainsky
- Uvarovsky
- Vdovolsky
- Verkhneantoshinsky
- Verkhnebezymyansky
- Verkhnesoinsky
- Verkhnetseplyayevsky
- Vikhlyantsevsky
- Vishnyakovsky
- Yegorovsky
- Zaburdyayevsky
- Zakhopyorsky
- Zelyony
- Zotov

== Yelansky District ==
Rural localities in Yelansky District:

- Alyavy
- Babinkino
- Berezovka
- Berezovka
- Bolshevik
- Bolshoy Morets
- Bulgurino
- Dubovoye
- Ivanovka
- Kalachiki
- Khoshchininsky
- Khvoshchinka
- Kiyevka
- Krasnotalovsky
- Krasny
- Krayishevo
- Marinsky
- Morets
- Nabat
- Nikolayevka
- Nosovsky
- Novobuzuluksky
- Novodobrinka
- Novopetrovsky
- Pervokamensky
- Poruchikovsky
- Rodinskoye
- Rovinsky
- Shchelokovka
- Talovka
- Ternovoye
- Tersa
- Toryanoye
- Trostyanka
- Vodopyanovo
- Volkovo
- Vyazovka
- Yereshkovo
- Zelyony
- Zhuravka

== Zhirnovsky District ==
Rural localities in Zhirnovsky District:

- Aleshniki
- Alexandrovka
- Andreyevka
- Bolshaya Knyazevka
- Borodachi
- Butyrka
- Chizhi
- Fomyonkovo
- Fyodorovka
- Grechikhino
- Klyonovka
- Makarovka
- Medveditsa
- Melovatka
- Melzavod
- Mirny
- Morozovo
- Nedostupov
- Nizhnyaya Dobrinka
- Novaya Bakhmetyevka
- Novinka
- Peskovka
- Podchinny
- Pogranichnoye
- Romanovka
- Serpokrylovo
- Tarapatino
- Teterevyatka
- Verkhnyaya Dobrinka
- Vishnyovoye
- Yershovka
- Zhuravka

== See also ==
- Lists of rural localities in Russia
