= Zakutsky =

Zakutsky Закутский
- Khutor
- Location within Volgograd Oblast Location within Russia
- Coordinates: 48°40′N 44°40′E
- Country: Russia
- Region: Volgograd Oblast
- District: Sredneakhtubinsky District
- Time zone: UTC+4:00

Zakutsky (Russian: Закутский) is a rural locality (a khutor) and the administrative center of Frunzenskoye Rural Settlement, Sredneakhtubinsky District, Volgograd Oblast, Russia. The population was 1,446 as of 2010. There are 27 streets.

== Geography ==
Zakutsky is located 18 km southwest of Srednyaya Akhtuba (the district's administrative centre) by road. Burkovsky is the nearest rural locality.
