= Knyazhensky 2-y =

Knyazhensky 2-y Княженский 2-й
- Khutor
- Location within Volgograd Oblast Location within Russia
- Coordinates: 49°57′N 42°56′E
- Country: Russia
- Region: Volgograd Oblast
- District: Mikhaylovka Urban Okrug
- Time zone: UTC+4:00

Knyazhensky 2-y (Russian: Княженский 2-й) is a rural locality (a khutor) in Mikhaylovka Urban Okrug, Volgograd Oblast, Russia. The population was 45 as of 2010. There are 7 streets.

== Geography ==
Knyazhensky 2-y is located 30 km southwest of Mikhaylovka. Knyazhensky 1-y is the nearest rural locality.
