= Alimov-Lyubimovsky =

Alimov-Lyubimovsky Алимов-Любимовский
- Khutor
- Location within Volgograd Oblast Location within Russia
- Coordinates: 50°15′N 42°45′E
- Country: Russia
- Region: Volgograd Oblast
- District: Novoanninsky District
- Time zone: UTC+4:00

Alimov-Lyubimovsky (Russian: Алимов-Любимовский) is a rural locality (a khutor) in Panfilovskoye Rural Settlement, Novoanninsky District, Volgograd Oblast, Russia. The population was 150 as of 2010. There are 2 streets.

== Geography ==
Alimov-Lyubimovsky is located in forest steppe on the Khopyorsko-Buzulukskaya Plain, on the bank of the Kumylga River, 39 km south of Novoanninsky (the district's administrative centre) by road. Sharashensky is the nearest rural locality.
