= Gurovo =

Gurovo Гурово
- Passing loop
- Location within Volgograd Oblast Location within Russia
- Coordinates: 49°57′N 43°12′E
- Country: Russia
- Region: Volgograd Oblast
- District: Mikhaylovka Urban Okrug
- Time zone: UTC+4:00

Gurovo (Russian: Гурово) is a rural locality (a passing loop) in Mikhaylovka Urban Okrug, Volgograd Oblast, Russia. The population was 4 as of 2010.
