= Novopetrovsky, Kalachyovsky District, Volgograd Oblast =

Novopetrovsky Новопетровский
- Khutor
- Location within Volgograd Oblast Location within Russia
- Coordinates: 48°28′N 43°34′E
- Country: Russia
- Region: Volgograd Oblast
- District: Kalachyovsky District
- Time zone: UTC+4:00

Novopetrovsky (Russian: Новопетровский) is a rural locality (a khutor) in Lyapichevskoye Rural Settlement, Kalachyovsky District, Volgograd Oblast, Russia. The population was 202 as of 2010. There are 6 streets.

== Geography ==
Novopetrovsky is located 56 km south of Kalach-na-Donu (the district's administrative centre) by road. Novolyapichev is the nearest rural locality.
