= Frolov, Volgograd Oblast =

Frolov Фролов
- Khutor
- Location within Volgograd Oblast Location within Russia
- Coordinates: 50°07′N 42°40′E
- Country: Russia
- Region: Volgograd Oblast
- District: Mikhaylovka Urban Okrug
- Time zone: UTC+4:00

Frolov (Russian: Фролов) is a rural locality (a khutor) in Mikhaylovka Urban Okrug, Volgograd Oblast, Russia. The population was 67 as of 2010. There are 4 streets.

== Geography ==
Frolov is located 10 km north of Mikhaylovka. Sebrovo is the nearest rural locality.
