= Senichkin =

Senichkin Сеничкин
- Khutor
- Location within Volgograd Oblast Location within Russia
- Coordinates: 50°02′N 42°53′E
- Country: Russia
- Region: Volgograd Oblast
- District: Mikhaylovka Urban Okrug
- Time zone: UTC+4:00

Senichkin (Russian: Сеничкин) is a rural locality (a khutor) in Mikhaylovka Urban Okrug, Volgograd Oblast, Russia. The population was 265 as of 2010. There are 9 streets.

== Geography ==
Senichkin is located 28 km west of Mikhaylovka. Zinovyev is the nearest rural locality.
