= Lysov, Volgograd Oblast =

Lysov Лысов
- Khutor
- Location within Volgograd Oblast Location within Russia
- Coordinates: 48°39′N 43°10′E
- Country: Russia
- Region: Volgograd Oblast
- District: Surovikinsky District
- Time zone: UTC+4:00

Lysov (Russian: Лысов) is a rural locality (a khutor) and the administrative center of Lysovskoye Rural Settlement, Surovikinsky District, Volgograd Oblast, Russia. The population was 371 as of 2010. There are 8 streets.

== Geography ==
Lysov is located on the left bank of the Liska River, 31 km ENE of Surovikino (the district's administrative centre) by road. Zryanin is the nearest rural locality.
