= Loznoy =

Loznoy Лозной
- Khutor
- Location within Volgograd Oblast Location within Russia
- Coordinates: 48°03′N 42°25′E
- Country: Russia
- Region: Volgograd Oblast
- District: Chernyshkovsky District
- Time zone: UTC+4:00

Loznoy (Russian: Лозной) is a rural locality (a khutor) in Nizhnegnutovskoye Rural Settlement, Chernyshkovsky District, Volgograd Oblast, Russia. The population was 313 as of 2010. There are 9 streets.

== Geography ==
Loznoy is located on Don Plain, 54 km southeast of Chernyshkovsky (the district's administrative centre) by road. Nizhnegnutov is the nearest rural locality.
