= Verkhnetseplyayevsky =

Verkhnetseplyayevsky Верхнецепляевский
- Khutor
- Location within Volgograd Oblast Location within Russia
- Coordinates: 50°59′N 42°06′E
- Country: Russia
- Region: Volgograd Oblast
- District: Uryupinsky District
- Time zone: UTC+4:00

Verkhnetseplyayevsky (Russian: Верхнецепляевский) is a rural locality (a khutor) in Vishnyakovskoye Rural Settlement, Uryupinsky District, Volgograd Oblast, Russia. The population was 66 as of 2010. There are 5 streets.

== Geography ==
Verkhnetseplyayevsky is located in forest steppe, 25 km northeast of Uryupinsk (the district's administrative centre) by road. Serkovsky is the nearest rural locality.
