= Gorsko-Popovsky =

Gorsko-Popovsky Горско-Поповский
- Khutor
- Location within Volgograd Oblast Location within Russia
- Coordinates: 50°48′N 41°54′E
- Country: Russia
- Region: Volgograd Oblast
- District: Uryupinsky District
- Time zone: UTC+4:00

Gorsko-Popovsky (Russian: Горско-Поповский) is a rural locality (a khutor) in Dobrinskoye Rural Settlement, Uryupinsky District, Volgograd Oblast, Russia. The population was 8 as of 2010.

== Geography ==
Gorsko-Popovsky is located in forest steppe, 12 km northwest of Uryupinsk (the district's administrative centre) by road. Gorsky is the nearest rural locality.
