= Podnizhny =

Podnizhny Поднижний
- Khutor
- Location within Volgograd Oblast Location within Russia
- Coordinates: 49°19′N 43°02′E
- Country: Russia
- Region: Volgograd Oblast
- District: Kletsky District
- Time zone: UTC+4:00

Podnizhny (Russian: Поднижний) is a rural locality (a khutor) in Kletskoye Rural Settlement, Kletsky District, Volgograd Oblast, Russia. The population was 264 as of 2010. There are 3 streets.

== Geography ==
Podnizhny is located on the Don River, 2 km northwest of Kletskaya (the district's administrative centre) by road. Karazhensky is the nearest rural locality.
