= Andreyanovka =

Andreyanovka Юрково
- Khutor
- Location within Volgograd Oblast Location within Russia
- Coordinates: 50°01′N 41°43′E
- Country: Russia
- Region: Volgograd Oblast
- District: Alexeyevsky District
- Time zone: UTC+4:00

Andreyanovka (Russian: Андреяновка) is a rural locality (a khutor) in Ryabovskoye Rural Settlement, Alexeyevsky District, Volgograd Oblast, Russia. The population was 102 as of 2010.

== Geography ==
Andreyanovka is located on the Malaya Peskovatka River, 73 km southwest of Alexeyevskaya (the district's administrative centre) by road. Ryabovsky is the nearest rural locality.
