= Minayevsky =

Minayevsky Минаевский
- Khutor
- Location within Volgograd Oblast Location within Russia
- Coordinates: 49°46′N 42°57′E
- Country: Russia
- Region: Volgograd Oblast
- District: Serafimovichsky District
- Time zone: UTC+4:00

Minayevsky (Russian: Минаевский) is a rural locality (a khutor) in Tryasinovskoye Rural Settlement, Serafimovichsky District, Volgograd Oblast, Russia. The population was 7 as of 2010.

== Geography ==
Minayevsky is located 31 km northeast of Serafimovich (the district's administrative centre) by road. Tryasinovsky is the nearest rural locality.
