= Krasny Sad =

Krasny Sad Красный Сад
- Khutor
- Location within Volgograd Oblast Location within Russia
- Coordinates: 48°40′N 44°53′E
- Country: Russia
- Region: Volgograd Oblast
- District: Sredneakhtubinsky District
- Time zone: UTC+4:00

Krasny Sad (Russian: Красный Сад) is a rural locality (a khutor) and the administrative center of Krasnoye Rural Settlement, Sredneakhtubinsky District, Volgograd Oblast, Russia. The population was 869 in 2010. There are 18 streets.

== Geography ==
Krasny Sad is located 12 km southeast of Srednyaya Akhtuba (the district's administrative centre) by road. Pervomaysky is the nearest rural locality.
