= Novaya Kvasnikovka =

Novaya Kvasnikovka Новая Квасниковка
- Selo
- Location within Volgograd Oblast Location within Russia
- Coordinates: 50°34′N 46°27′E
- Country: Russia
- Region: Volgograd Oblast
- District: Staropoltavsky District
- Time zone: UTC+4:00

Novaya Kvasnikovka (Russian: Новая Квасниковка) is a rural locality (a selo) and the administrative center of Novokvasnikovskoye Rural Settlement, Staropoltavsky District, Volgograd Oblast, Russia. The population was 603 as of 2010. There are 4 streets.

== Geography ==
Novaya Kvasnikovka is located on the left bank of the Yeruslan River, 13 km north of Staraya Poltavka (the district's administrative centre) by road. Mirnoye is the nearest rural locality.
