= Zimovsky, Volgograd Oblast =

Zimovsky Зимовский
- Khutor
- Location within Volgograd Oblast Location within Russia
- Coordinates: 49°31′N 43°34′E
- Country: Russia
- Region: Volgograd Oblast
- District: Frolovsky District
- Time zone: UTC+4:00

Zimovsky (Russian: Зимовский) is a rural locality (a khutor) in Krasnolipovskoye Rural Settlement, Frolovsky District, Volgograd Oblast, Russia. The population was 30 as of 2010.

== Geography ==
Zimovsky is located on south of Frolovsky District, 32 km southwest of Prigorodny (the district's administrative centre) by road. Vyezdinsky is the nearest rural locality.
