= Chebotarevsky =

Chebotarevsky Чеботаревский
- Khutor
- Location within Volgograd Oblast Location within Russia
- Coordinates: 49°29′N 42°17′E
- Country: Russia
- Region: Volgograd Oblast
- District: Serafimovichsky District
- Time zone: UTC+4:00

Chebotarevsky (Russian: Чеботаревский) is a rural locality (a khutor) in Bolshovskoye Rural Settlement, Serafimovichsky District, Volgograd Oblast, Russia. The population was 109 as of 2010. There are 5 streets.

== Geography ==
Chebotarevsky is located on the Tsutskan River, 45 km southwest of Serafimovich (the district's administrative centre) by road. Kotovsky is the nearest rural locality.
