= Buyerak-Senyutkin =

Buyerak-Senyutkin Буерак-Сенюткин
- Khutor
- Location within Volgograd Oblast Location within Russia
- Coordinates: 49°33′N 42°35′E
- Country: Russia
- Region: Volgograd Oblast
- District: Serafimovichsky District
- Time zone: UTC+4:00

Buyerak-Senyutkin (Russian: Буерак-Сенюткин) is a rural locality (a khutor) in Buyerak-Popovskoye Rural Settlement, Serafimovichsky District, Volgograd Oblast, Russia. The population was 134 as of 2010. There are 3 streets.

== Geography ==
Buyerak-Senyutkin is located 16 km southwest of Serafimovich (the district's administrative centre) by road. Buyerak-Popovsky is the nearest rural locality.
