= Udodovsky =

Udodovsky Удодовский
- Khutor
- Location within Volgograd Oblast Location within Russia
- Coordinates: 50°29′N 43°12′E
- Country: Russia
- Region: Volgograd Oblast
- District: Novoanninsky District
- Time zone: UTC+4:00

Udodovsky (Russian: Удодовский) is a rural locality (a khutor) in Trostyanskoye Rural Settlement, Novoanninsky District, Volgograd Oblast, Russia. The population was 182 as of 2010. There are 4 streets.

== Geography ==
Udodovsky is located in forest steppe on the Khopyorsko-Buzulukskaya Plain, 59 km southeast of Novoanninsky (the district's administrative centre) by road. Trostyansky is the nearest rural locality.
