= Yaminsky (Yaminskoye Rural Settlement), Alexeyevsky District, Volgograd Oblast =

Yaminsky Яминский
- Khutor
- Location within Volgograd Oblast Location within Russia
- Coordinates: 50°19′N 42°13′E
- Country: Russia
- Region: Volgograd Oblast
- District: Alexeyevsky District
- Time zone: UTC+4:00

Yaminsky (Russian: Яминский) is a rural locality (a khutor) and the administrative center of Yaminskoye Rural Settlement, Alexeyevsky District, Volgograd Oblast, Russia. The population was 1,529 as of 2013.

== Geography ==
The village is located 5 km north-east from Alexeyevskaya, on the left bank of the Buzuluk River.
