= Tishanka, Volgograd Oblast =

Tishanka Тишанка
- Selo
- Location within Volgograd Oblast Location within Russia
- Coordinates: 49°45′N 44°15′E
- Country: Russia
- Region: Volgograd Oblast
- District: Olkhovsky District
- Time zone: UTC+4:00

Tishanka (Russian: Тишанка) is a rural locality (a selo) in Solodchinskoye Rural Settlement, Olkhovsky District, Volgograd Oblast, Russia. The population was 13 as of 2010.

== Geography ==
Tishanka is located in steppe, on the bank of the Tishanka River, 37 km southwest of Olkhovka (the district's administrative centre) by road. Zakharovka is the nearest rural locality.
