= Lagutin =

Lagutin Лагутин
- Khutor
- Location within Volgograd Oblast Location within Russia
- Coordinates: 48°29′N 42°24′E
- Country: Russia
- Region: Volgograd Oblast
- District: Chernyshkovsky District
- Time zone: UTC+4:00

Lagutin (Russian: Лагутин) is a rural locality (a khutor) in Bolsheternovskoye Rural Settlement, Chernyshkovsky District, Volgograd Oblast, Russia. The population was 35 as of 2010.

== Geography ==
Lagutin is located on the Don plain, 25 km northeast of Chernyshkovsky (the district's administrative centre) by road. Bolsheternovoy is the nearest rural locality.
