= Bolshoy Golovsky =

Bolshoy Golovsky Большой Головский
- Khutor
- Location within Volgograd Oblast Location within Russia
- Coordinates: 50°35′N 42°11′E
- Country: Russia
- Region: Volgograd Oblast
- District: Novoanninsky District
- Time zone: UTC+4:00

Bolshoy Golovsky (Russian: Большой Головский) is a rural locality (a khutor) in Deminskoye Rural Settlement, Novoanninsky District, Volgograd Oblast, Russia. The population was 208 as of 2010. There are 2 streets.

== Geography ==
Bolshoy Golovsky is located in forest steppe on the Khopyorsko-Buzulukskaya Plain, 46 km northwest of Novoanninsky (the district's administrative centre) by road. Maly Dubovsky is the nearest rural locality.
