= Nabat, Volgograd Oblast =

Nabat Набат
- Settlement
- Location within Volgograd Oblast Location within Russia
- Coordinates: 50°58′N 43°44′E
- Country: Russia
- Region: Volgograd Oblast
- District: Yelansky District
- Time zone: UTC+4:00

Nabat (Russian: Набат) is a rural locality (a settlement) in Yelanskoye Urban Settlement, Yelansky District, Volgograd Oblast, Russia. The population was 385 as of 2010. There are 5 streets.

== Geography ==
Nabat is located on Khopyorsko-Buzulukskaya Plain, on the bank of the Yelan River, 3 km northeast of Yelan (the district's administrative centre) by road. Yelan is the nearest rural locality.
