= Loshchinovsky =

Loshchinovsky Лощиновский
- Khutor
- Location within Volgograd Oblast Location within Russia
- Coordinates: 50°45′N 41°23′E
- Country: Russia
- Region: Volgograd Oblast
- District: Uryupinsky District
- Time zone: UTC+4:00

Loshchinovsky (Russian: Лощиновский) is a rural locality (a khutor) in Iskrinskoye Rural Settlement, Uryupinsky District, Volgograd Oblast, Russia. The population was 432 as of 2010. There are 9 streets.

== Geography ==
Loshchinovsky is located in steppe, 53 km west of Uryupinsk (the district's administrative centre) by road. Rozovsky is the nearest rural locality.
