= Novy Tikhonov =

Novy Tikhonov Новый Тихонов
- Khutor
- Location within Volgograd Oblast Location within Russia
- Coordinates: 50°18′N 46°26′E
- Country: Russia
- Region: Volgograd Oblast
- District: Staropoltavsky District
- Time zone: UTC+4:00

Novy Tikhonov (Russian: Новый Тихонов) is a rural locality (a khutor) and the administrative center of Novotikhonovskoye Rural Settlement, Staropoltavsky District, Volgograd Oblast, Russia. The population was 354 as of 2010. There are 11 streets.

== Geography ==
Novy Tikhonov is located in steppe, 44 km south of Staraya Poltavka (the district's administrative centre) by road. Posevnoy is the nearest rural locality.
