= Nizhniye Cherni =

Nizhniye Cherni Нижние Черни
- Khutor
- Location within Volgograd Oblast Location within Russia
- Coordinates: 47°41′N 43°25′E
- Country: Russia
- Region: Volgograd Oblast
- District: Kotelnikovsky District
- Time zone: UTC+4:00

Nizhniye Cherni (Russian: Нижние Черни) is a rural locality (a khutor) in Pimeno-Chernyanskoye Rural Settlement, Kotelnikovsky District, Volgograd Oblast, Russia. The population was 379 as of 2010. There are 17 streets.

== Geography ==
Nizhniye Cherni is located on the right bank of the Aksay Kurmoyarsky River, 33 km northeast of Kotelnikovo (the district's administrative centre) by road. Pimeno-Cherni is the nearest rural locality.
