= Staraya Balka =

Staraya Balka Старая Балка
- Khutor
- Location within Volgograd Oblast Location within Russia
- Coordinates: 49°59′N 46°41′E
- Country: Russia
- Region: Volgograd Oblast
- District: Pallasovsky District
- Time zone: UTC+4:00

Staraya Balka (Russian: Старая Балка) is a rural locality (a khutor) in Krasnooktyabrskoye Rural Settlement, Pallasovsky District, Volgograd Oblast, Russia. The population was 346 as of 2010. There are 4 streets.

== Geography ==
Staraya Balka is located 17 km southwest of Pallasovka (the district's administrative centre) by road. Staraya Ivantsovka is the nearest rural locality.
