= Verkhnesolonovsky =

Verkhnesolonovsky Верхнесолоновский
- Khutor
- Location within Volgograd Oblast Location within Russia
- Coordinates: 48°22′N 42°50′E
- Country: Russia
- Region: Volgograd Oblast
- District: Surovikinsky District
- Time zone: UTC+4:00

Verkhnesolonovsky (Russian: Верхнесолоновский) is a rural locality (a khutor) and the administrative center of Verkhnesolonovskoye Rural Settlement, Surovikinsky District, Volgograd Oblast, Russia. The population was 770 as of 2010. There are 16 streets.

== Geography ==
Verkhnesolonovsky is located 33 km south of Surovikino (the district's administrative centre) by road. Nizhnesolonovsky is the nearest rural locality.
