= Rossoshinsky =

Rossoshinsky Россошинский
- Khutor
- Location within Volgograd Oblast Location within Russia
- Coordinates: 50°40′N 41°47′E
- Country: Russia
- Region: Volgograd Oblast
- District: Uryupinsky District
- Time zone: UTC+4:00

Rossoshinsky (Russian: Россошинский) is a rural locality (a khutor) and the administrative center of Rossoshinskoye Rural Settlement, Uryupinsky District, Volgograd Oblast, Russia. The population was 611 as of 2010. There are 7 streets.

== Geography ==
Rossoshinsky is located in steppe, 32 km southwest of Uryupinsk (the district's administrative centre) by road. Safonovsky is the nearest rural locality.
