= Volzhanka =

Volzhanka Волжанка
- Settlement
- Location within Volgograd Oblast Location within Russia
- Coordinates: 48°58′N 44°55′E
- Country: Russia
- Region: Volgograd Oblast
- District: Sredneakhtubinsky District
- Time zone: UTC+4:00

Volzhanka (Russian: Волжанка) is a rural locality (a settlement) in Verkhnepogromenskoye Rural Settlement, Sredneakhtubinsky District, Volgograd Oblast, Russia. The population was 166 as of 2010. There are 8 streets.

== Geography ==
Volzhanka is located near the left bank of the Volga River, 41 km NNE of Srednyaya Akhtuba (the district's administrative centre) by road. Rakhinka is the nearest rural locality.
