= Otgonny =

Otgonny Отгонный
- Khutor
- Location within Volgograd Oblast Location within Russia
- Coordinates: 49°00′N 46°30′E
- Country: Russia
- Region: Volgograd Oblast
- District: Pallasovsky District
- Time zone: UTC+4:00

Otgonny (Russian: Отгонный) is a rural locality (a khutor) in Eltonskoye Rural Settlement, Pallasovsky District, Volgograd Oblast, Russia. The population was 39 as of 2010. There are 2 streets.

== Geography ==
Otgonny is located 143 km southwest of Pallasovka (the district's administrative centre) by road. Priozerny is the nearest rural locality.
