= Beryozovskaya, Volgograd Oblast =

Beryozovskaya Берёзовская
- Stanitsa
- Location within Volgograd Oblast Location within Russia
- Coordinates: 50°15′N 43°58′E
- Country: Russia
- Region: Volgograd Oblast
- District: Danilovsky District
- Time zone: UTC+4:00

Beryozovskaya (Russian: Берёзовская) is a rural locality (a stanitsa) and the administrative center of Beryozovskoye Rural Settlement, Danilovsky District, Volgograd Oblast, Russia. The population was 1,769 as of 2010. There are 22 streets.

== Geography ==
Beryozovskaya is located in forest steppe, on the left bank of the Medveditsa River, 31 km southwest of Danilovka (the district's administrative centre) by road. 1-y Plotnikov is the nearest rural locality.
