= Pokruchinsky =

Pokruchinsky Покручинский
- Khutor
- Location within Volgograd Oblast Location within Russia
- Coordinates: 50°03′N 42°27′E
- Country: Russia
- Region: Volgograd Oblast
- District: Kumylzhensky District
- Time zone: UTC+4:00

Pokruchinsky (Russian: Покручинский) is a rural locality (a khutor) Sulyayevskoye Rural Settlement, Kumylzhensky District, Volgograd Oblast, Russia. The population was 429 as of 2010. There are 6 streets.

== Geography ==
Pokruchinsky is located in forest steppe, on Khopyorsko-Buzulukskaya Plain, on the bank of the Khopyor River, 36 km northwest of Kumylzhenskaya (the district's administrative centre) by road. Sidorovka is the nearest rural locality.
