= Dom Otdykha 40 let Oktyabrya =

Dom Otdykha 40 let Oktyabrya Дом Отдыха «40 лет Октября»
- Settlement
- Location within Volgograd Oblast Location within Russia
- Coordinates: 48°16′N 43°04′E
- Country: Russia
- Region: Volgograd Oblast
- District: Surovikinsky District
- Time zone: UTC+4:00

Dom Otdykha 40 let Oktyabrya (Russian: Дом Отдыха «40 лет Октября») is a rural locality (a settlement) in Nizhnechirskoye Rural Settlement, Surovikinsky District, Volgograd Oblast, Russia. The population was 10 as of 2010.

== Geography ==
The settlement is located 57 km southeast of Surovikino (the district's administrative centre) by road. Suvorovskaya is the nearest rural locality.
