= Verkhnesoinsky =

Verkhnesoinsky Верхнесоинский
- Khutor
- Location within Volgograd Oblast Location within Russia
- Coordinates: 50°43′N 41°41′E
- Country: Russia
- Region: Volgograd Oblast
- District: Uryupinsky District
- Time zone: UTC+4:00

Verkhnesoinsky (Russian: Верхнесоинский) is a rural locality (a khutor) in Rossoshinskoye Rural Settlement, Uryupinsky District, Volgograd Oblast, Russia. The population was 351 as of 2010. There are 4 streets.

== Geography ==
Verkhnesoinsky is located in forest steppe, 31 km southwest of Uryupinsk (the district's administrative centre) by road. Nizhnesoinsky is the nearest rural locality.
