= Davydovka, Volgograd Oblast =

Davydovka Давыдовка
- Selo
- Location within Volgograd Oblast Location within Russia
- Coordinates: 49°17′N 44°38′E
- Country: Russia
- Region: Volgograd Oblast
- District: Dubovsky District
- Time zone: UTC+4:00

Davydovka (Russian: Давыдовка) is a rural locality (a selo) and the administrative center of Davydovskoye Rural Settlement, Dubovsky District, Volgograd Oblast, Russia. The population was 732 as of 2010. There are 14 streets.

== Geography ==
Davydovka is located in steppe, 37 km northwest of Dubovka (the district's administrative centre) by road. Pryamaya Balka is the nearest rural locality.
