= Ilmen, Volgograd Oblast =

Ilmen Ильмень
- Selo
- Location within Volgograd Oblast Location within Russia
- Coordinates: 50°50′N 44°23′E
- Country: Russia
- Region: Volgograd Oblast
- District: Rudnyansky District
- Time zone: UTC+4:00 (MSK Moscow Standard Time)

Ilmen (Russian: Ильмень) is a rural locality (a selo) and the administrative center of Ilmenskoye Rural Settlement, Rudnyansky District, Volgograd Oblast, Russia. The population was 1,156 as of 2010. There are 13 streets.

== Geography ==
Ilmen is located in steppe, on the Khopyorsko-Buzulukskaya Plain, 17 km northwest of Rudnya (the district's administrative centre) by road. Rudnya is the nearest rural locality.
