= Rasstrigin, Kikvidzensky District, Volgograd Oblast =

Rasstrigin Расстригин
- Khutor
- Location within Volgograd Oblast Location within Russia
- Coordinates: 50°42′N 42°52′E
- Country: Russia
- Region: Volgograd Oblast
- District: Kikvidzensky District
- Time zone: UTC+4:00

Rasstrigin (Russian: Расстригин) is a rural locality (a khutor) in Dubrovskoye Rural Settlement, Kikvidzensky District, Volgograd Oblast, Russia. The population was 127 as of 2010. There are 6 streets.

== Geography ==
Rasstrigin is located on Khopyorsko-Buzulukskaya plain, on the left bank of the Buzuluk River, 17 km southwest of Preobrazhenskaya (the district's administrative centre) by road. Dubrovsky is the nearest rural locality.
