= Rogozhin, Volgograd Oblast =

Rogozhin Рогожин
- Khutor
- Location within Volgograd Oblast Location within Russia
- Coordinates: 50°10′N 43°00′E
- Country: Russia
- Region: Volgograd Oblast
- District: Mikhaylovka Urban Okrug
- Time zone: UTC+4:00

Rogozhin (Russian: Рогожин) is a rural locality (a khutor) in Mikhaylovka Urban Okrug, Volgograd Oblast, Russia. The population was 417 as of 2010. There are 15 streets.

== Geography ==
Rogozhin is located 25 km northwest of Mikhaylovka. Troitsky is the nearest rural locality.
