= Banny, Volgograd Oblast =

Banny Банный
- Khutor
- Location within Volgograd Oblast Location within Russia
- Coordinates: 49°55′N 43°50′E
- Country: Russia
- Region: Volgograd Oblast
- District: Frolovsky District
- Time zone: UTC+4:00

Banny (Russian: Банный) is a rural locality (a khutor) in Lychakskoye Rural Settlement, Frolovsky District, Volgograd Oblast, Russia. The population was 68 as of 2010.

== Geography ==
Banny is located in center of Frolovsky District, 23 km northeast of Prigorodny (the district's administrative centre) by road. Blagodatny is the nearest rural locality.
