= Veliky Oktyabr =

Veliky Oktyabr Великий Октябрь
- Settlement
- Location within Volgograd Oblast Location within Russia
- Coordinates: 48°39′N 44°43′E
- Country: Russia
- Region: Volgograd Oblast
- District: Sredneakhtubinsky District
- Time zone: UTC+4:00

Veliky Oktyabr (Russian: Великий Октябрь) is a rural locality (a settlement) in Kuybyshevskoye Rural Settlement, Sredneakhtubinsky District, Volgograd Oblast, Russia. The population was 550 as of 2010. There are 13 streets.

== Geography ==
Veliky Oktyabr is located 15 km southwest of Srednyaya Akhtuba (the district's administrative centre) by road. Vyazovka is the nearest rural locality.
