= Rodionovsky =

Rodionovsky Родионовский
- Khutor
- Location within Volgograd Oblast Location within Russia
- Coordinates: 49°56′N 42°34′E
- Country: Russia
- Region: Volgograd Oblast
- District: Kumylzhensky District
- Time zone: UTC+4:00

Rodionovsky (Russian: Родионовский) is a rural locality (a khutor) in Kumylzhenskoye Rural Settlement, Kumylzhensky District, Volgograd Oblast, Russia. The population was 235 as of 2010. There are 6 streets.

== Geography ==
Rodionovsky is located between Lyalinsky and Chunosovsky, on the bank of the Kumylga River, 10 km north of Kumylzhenskaya (the district's administrative centre) by road. Lyalinsky is the nearest rural locality.
