= Krasny Oktyabr, Sredneakhtubinsky District, Volgograd Oblast =

Krasny Oktyabr Красный Октябрь
- Settlement
- Location within Volgograd Oblast Location within Russia
- Coordinates: 49°04′N 45°18′E
- Country: Russia
- Region: Volgograd Oblast
- District: Sredneakhtubinsky District
- Time zone: UTC+4:00

Krasny Oktyabr (Russian: Красный Октябрь) is a rural locality (a settlement) and the administrative center of Krasnooktyabrskoye Rural Settlement, Sredneakhtubinsky District, Volgograd Oblast, Russia. The population was 1,246 as of 2010. There are 22 streets.

== Geography ==
Krasny Oktyabr is located 75 km northeast of Srednyaya Akhtuba (the district's administrative centre) by road. Rassvet is the nearest rural locality.
