= Kilyakovka =

Kilyakovka Киляковка
- Settlement
- Location within Volgograd Oblast Location within Russia
- Coordinates: 48°44′N 44°47′E
- Country: Russia
- Region: Volgograd Oblast
- District: Sredneakhtubinsky District
- Time zone: UTC+4:00

Kilyakovka (Russian: Киляковка) is a rural locality (a settlement) in Akhtubinskoye Rural Settlement, Sredneakhtubinsky District, Volgograd Oblast, Russia. The population was 280 as of 2010. There are 42 streets.

== Geography ==
Kilyakovka is located 10 km northwest of Srednyaya Akhtuba (the district's administrative centre) by road. Lesnaya Usadba is the nearest rural locality.
