= Darganov =

Darganov Дарганов
- Khutor
- Location within Volgograd Oblast Location within Russia
- Coordinates: 47°41′N 43°39′E
- Country: Russia
- Region: Volgograd Oblast
- District: Kotelnikovsky District
- Time zone: UTC+4:00

Darganov (Russian: Дарганов) is a rural locality (a khutor) in Vypasnovskoye Rural Settlement, Kotelnikovsky District, Volgograd Oblast, Russia. The population was 151 as of 2010. There are 3 streets.

== Geography ==
Darganov is located 115 km east of Kotelnikovo (the district's administrative centre) by road. Sharnut is the nearest rural locality.
