= Peskovka, Volgograd Oblast =

Peskovka Песковка
- Selo
- Location within Volgograd Oblast Location within Russia
- Coordinates: 51°04′06″N 44°57′32″E
- Country: Russia
- Region: Volgograd Oblast
- District: Zhirnovsky District
- Time zone: UTC+4:00

Peskovka (Russian: Песковка) is a rural locality (a selo) in the Medveditskoe rural settlement, Zhirnovsky District, Volgograd Oblast, Russia.

It was formerly a Volga German colony in Russia, named Peskovatka, established in 1767, 90 km south-west of the regional center of Saratov. While the Russian administration named the colony Peskovatka (after the nearby stream), the German people residing there called their colony Kolb, after the first "Vorsteher" (administrative leader) of the colony, Andreas Kolb, who was from Hessenberg.

On August 28, 1941, the Decree of the Presidium of the USSR Supreme Soviet on the resettlement of Germans living in the Volga region was issued and the German population was deported to Siberia. The village of Peskovatka was later renamed Peskovka.
