= Ternovoy, Kotelnikovsky District, Volgograd Oblast =

Ternovoy Терновой
- Settlement
- Location within Volgograd Oblast Location within Russia
- Coordinates: 47°50′N 43°39′E
- Country: Russia
- Region: Volgograd Oblast
- District: Kotelnikovsky District
- Time zone: UTC+4:00

Ternovoy (Russian: Терновой) is a rural locality (a settlement) in Chilekovskoye Rural Settlement, Kotelnikovsky District, Volgograd Oblast, Russia. The population was 221 as of 2010. There are 4 streets.

== Geography ==
Ternovoy is located 53 km northeast of Kotelnikovo (the district's administrative centre) by road. Samokhino is the nearest rural locality.
