= Morskoy, Chernyshkovsky District, Volgograd Oblast =

Morskoy Морской
- Khutor
- Location within Volgograd Oblast Location within Russia
- Coordinates: 48°05′N 42°35′E
- Country: Russia
- Region: Volgograd Oblast
- District: Chernyshkovsky District
- Time zone: UTC+4:00

Morskoy (Russian: Морской) is a rural locality (a khutor) in Tormosinovskoye Rural Settlement, Chernyshkovsky District, Volgograd Oblast, Russia. The population was 287 as of 2010.

== Geography ==
Morskoy is located in southwest of Vologda Oblast, 68 km southeast of Chernyshkovsky (the district's administrative centre) by road. Loznoy is the nearest rural locality.
