= Kletsko-Pochtovsky =

Kletsko-Pochtovsky Клетско-Почтовский
- Khutor
- Location within Volgograd Oblast Location within Russia
- Coordinates: 49°35′N 43°03′E
- Country: Russia
- Region: Volgograd Oblast
- District: Serafimovichsky District
- Time zone: UTC+4:00

Kletsko-Pochtovsky (Russian: Клетско-Почтовский) is a rural locality (a khutor) and the administrative center of Kletsko-Pochtovskoye Rural Settlement, Serafimovichsky District, Volgograd Oblast, Russia. The population was 1,065 as of 2010. There are 25 streets.

== Geography ==
Kletsko-Pochtovsky is located 69 km east of Serafimovich (the district's administrative centre) by road. Otrozhki is the nearest rural locality.
