= Fomikhinsky =

Fomikhinsky Фомихинский
- Khutor
- Location within Volgograd Oblast Location within Russia
- Coordinates: 49°24′N 42°33′E
- Country: Russia
- Region: Volgograd Oblast
- District: Serafimovichsky District
- Time zone: UTC+4:00

Fomikhinsky (Russian: Фомихинский) is a rural locality (a khutor) in Srednetsaritsynskoye Rural Settlement, Serafimovichsky District, Volgograd Oblast, Russia. The population was 91 as of 2010. There are 8 streets.

== Geography ==
Fomikhinsky is located 31 km southwest of Serafimovich (the district's administrative centre) by road. Karagichev is the nearest rural locality.
