= Verkhneaksyonovsky =

Verkhneaksyonovsky Верхнеаксёновский
- Khutor
- Location within Volgograd Oblast Location within Russia
- Coordinates: 48°20′N 42°37′E
- Country: Russia
- Region: Volgograd Oblast
- District: Surovikinsky District
- Time zone: UTC+4:00

Verkhneaksyonovsky (Russian: Верхнеаксёновский) is a rural locality (a khutor) in Verkhnesolonovskoye Rural Settlement, Surovikinsky District, Volgograd Oblast, Russia. The population was 145 as of 2010. There are 4 streets.

== Geography ==
Verkhneaksyonovsky is located on the right bank of the Aksenets River, 82 km southwest of Surovikino (the district's administrative centre) by road. Posyolok otdeleniya 3 sovkhoza Krasnaya Zvezda is the nearest rural locality.
