= Lapshinskaya =

Lapshinskaya Лапшинская
- Settlement
- Location within Volgograd Oblast Location within Russia
- Coordinates: 50°21′N 44°59′E
- Country: Russia
- Region: Volgograd Oblast
- District: Kotovsky District
- Time zone: UTC+4:00

Lapshinskaya (Russian: Лапшинская) is a rural locality (a settlement) and the administrative center of Lapshinskoye Rural Settlement, Kotovsky District, Volgograd Oblast, Russia. The population was 790 as of 2010. There are 18 streets.

== Geography ==
The village is located in forest steppe, on Volga Upland, on the left bank of the Mokraya Olkhovka River, 240 km from Volgograd, 22 km from Kotovo.
