= Krasnotalovsky =

Krasnotalovsky Красноталовский
- Khutor
- Location within Volgograd Oblast Location within Russia
- Coordinates: 50°47′N 43°30′E
- Country: Russia
- Region: Volgograd Oblast
- District: Yelansky District
- Time zone: UTC+4:00

Krasnotalovsky (Russian: Красноталовский) is a rural locality (a khutor) in Trostyanskoye Rural Settlement, Yelansky District, Volgograd Oblast, Russia. The population was 456 as of 2010. There are 4 streets.

== Geography ==
Krasnotalovsky is located on Khopyorsko-Buzulukskaya Plain, on the bank of the Buzuluk River, 36 km southwest of Yelan (the district's administrative centre) by road. Trostyanka is the nearest rural locality.
