= Verkhnetsimlyansky =

Verkhnetsimlyansky Верхнецимлянский
- Khutor
- Location within Volgograd Oblast Location within Russia
- Coordinates: 48°27′N 42°33′E
- Country: Russia
- Region: Volgograd Oblast
- District: Chernyshkovsky District
- Time zone: UTC+4:00

Verkhnetsimlyansky (Russian: Верхнецимлянский) is a rural locality (a khutor) in Krasnoyarskoye Rural Settlement, Chernyshkovsky District, Volgograd Oblast, Russia. The population was 19 as of 2010.

== Geography ==
Verkhnetsimlyansky is located 31 km northeast of Chernyshkovsky (the district's administrative centre) by road. Maloternovoy is the nearest rural locality.
