= Ilmensky 2-y =

Ilmensky 2-y Ильменский 2-й
- Khutor
- Location within Volgograd Oblast Location within Russia
- Coordinates: 50°13′N 43°33′E
- Country: Russia
- Region: Volgograd Oblast
- District: Mikhaylovka Urban Okrug
- Time zone: UTC+4:00

Ilmensky 2-y (Russian: Ильменский 2-й) is a rural locality (a khutor) in Mikhaylovka Urban Okrug, Volgograd Oblast, Russia. The population was 294 as of 2010. There are 6 streets.

== Geography ==
Ilmensky 2-y is located 35 km northeast of Mikhaylovka. Bolshaya Glushitsa is the nearest rural locality.
