= Leninskoye, Volgograd Oblast =

Leninskoye Ленинское
- Selo
- Location within Volgograd Oblast Location within Russia
- Coordinates: 50°02′N 45°32′E
- Country: Russia
- Region: Volgograd Oblast
- District: Nikolayevsky District
- Time zone: UTC+4:00

Leninskoye (Russian: Ленинское) is a rural locality (a selo) and the administrative center of Leninskoye Rural Settlement, Nikolayevsky District, Volgograd Oblast, Russia. The population was 1,414 as of 2010. There are 28 streets.
