= Serebryansky =

Serebryansky Серебрянский
- Khutor
- Location within Volgograd Oblast Location within Russia
- Coordinates: 50°16′N 42°25′E
- Country: Russia
- Region: Volgograd Oblast
- District: Alexeyevsky District
- Time zone: UTC+4:00

Serebryansky (Russian: Серебрянский) is a rural locality (a khutor) in Krasnooktyabrskoye Rural Settlement, Alexeyevsky District, Volgograd Oblast, Russia. The population was 77 as of 2010.

== Geography ==
Serebryansky is located 23 km east of stanitsa Alexeyevskaya (the district's administrative centre) by road. Krasny Oktyabr (lit. Red October) is the nearest rural locality.
