= Amochayevsky =

Amochayevsky Амочаевский
- Khutor
- Location within Volgograd Oblast Location within Russia
- Coordinates: 50°42′N 42°25′E
- Country: Russia
- Region: Volgograd Oblast
- District: Novoanninsky District
- Time zone: UTC+4:00

Amochayevsky (Russian: Амочаевский) is a rural locality (a khutor) in Cherkesovskoye Rural Settlement, Novoanninsky District, Volgograd Oblast, Russia. The population was 30 as of 2010.

== Geography ==
Amochayevsky is located in forest steppe on the Khopyorsko-Buzulukskaya Plain, on the bank of the Panika River, 36 km northwest of Novoanninsky (the district's administrative centre) by road. Cherkesovsky is the nearest rural locality.
