= Razlivka =

Razlivka Разливка
- Selo
- Location within Volgograd Oblast Location within Russia
- Coordinates: 50°47′N 44°24′E
- Country: Russia
- Region: Volgograd Oblast
- District: Rudnyansky District
- Time zone: UTC+4:00

Razlivka (Russian: Разливка) is a rural locality (a selo) in Rudnyanskoye Urban Settlement, Rudnyansky District, Volgograd Oblast, Russia. The population was 14 as of 2010.

== Geography ==
Razlivka is located in forest steppe, on the right bank of the Tersa River, 15 km west of Rudnya (the district's administrative centre) by road. Ilmen is the nearest rural locality.
