= Verkhneyablochny =

Verkhneyablochny Верхнеяблочный
- Khutor
- Location within Volgograd Oblast Location within Russia
- Coordinates: 47°49′N 43°11′E
- Country: Russia
- Region: Volgograd Oblast
- District: Kotelnikovsky District
- Time zone: UTC+4:00

Verkhneyablochny (Russian: Верхнеяблочный) is a rural locality (a khutor) in Nizhneyablochnoye Rural Settlement, Kotelnikovsky District, Volgograd Oblast, Russia. The population was 336 as of 2010. There are 5 streets.

== Geography ==
Verkhneyablochny is located in steppe, 24 km north of Kotelnikovo (the district's administrative centre) by road. Nizhneyablochny is the nearest rural locality.
