= Prutskovsky =

Prutskovsky Пруцковский
- Khutor
- Location within Volgograd Oblast Location within Russia
- Coordinates: 51°05′N 42°18′E
- Country: Russia
- Region: Volgograd Oblast
- District: Novonikolayevsky District
- Time zone: UTC+4:00

Prutskovsky (Russian: Пруцковский) is a rural locality (a khutor) in Duplaytskoye Rural Settlement, Novonikolayevsky District, Volgograd Oblast, Russia. The population was 148 as of 2010. There are 6 streets.

== Geography ==
Prutskovsky is located in steppe, on the Khopyorsko-Buzulukskaya Plain, 25 km northwest of Novonikolayevsky (the district's administrative centre) by road. Kosarka is the nearest rural locality.
