= Plamenka =

Plamenka Пламенка
- Khutor
- Location within Volgograd Oblast Location within Russia
- Coordinates: 48°34′N 44°42′E
- Country: Russia
- Region: Volgograd Oblast
- District: Sredneakhtubinsky District
- Time zone: UTC+4:00

Plamenka (Russian: Пламенка) is a rural locality (a khutor) in Kletskoye Rural Settlement, Sredneakhtubinsky District, Volgograd Oblast, Russia. The population was 340 as of 2010. There are 8 streets.

== Geography ==
Plamenka is located 31 km southwest of Srednyaya Akhtuba (the district's administrative centre) by road. Shchuchy is the nearest rural locality.
