= Chulinsky =

Chulinsky Чулинский
- Khutor
- Location within Volgograd Oblast Location within Russia
- Coordinates: 50°55′N 42°25′E
- Country: Russia
- Region: Volgograd Oblast
- District: Novonikolayevsky District
- Time zone: UTC+4:00

Chulinsky (Russian: Чулинский) is a rural locality (a khutor) in Novonikolayevskoye Rural Settlement, Novonikolayevsky District, Volgograd Oblast, Russia. The population was 55 as of 2010. There are 6 streets.

== Geography ==
Chulinsky is located in steppe, on the Khopyorsko-Buzulukskaya Plain, 8 km southeast of Novonikolayevsky (the district's administrative centre) by road. Novonikolayevsky is the nearest rural locality.
