= Kanalnaya =

Kanalnaya Канальная
- Station
- Location within Volgograd Oblast Location within Russia
- Coordinates: 48°25′N 44°23′E
- Country: Russia
- Region: Volgograd Oblast
- District: Svetloyarsky District
- Time zone: UTC+4:00

Kanalnaya (Russian: Канальная) is a rural locality (a station) in Svetloyarsky District, Volgograd Oblast, Russia. The population was 377 as of 2010. There are 5 streets.
