= Topolyovsky =

Topolyovsky Тополёвский
- Khutor
- Location within Volgograd Oblast Location within Russia
- Coordinates: 50°51′N 41°49′E
- Country: Russia
- Region: Volgograd Oblast
- District: Uryupinsky District
- Time zone: UTC+4:00

Topolyovsky (Russian: Тополёвский) is a rural locality (a khutor) in Dobrinskoye Rural Settlement, Uryupinsky District, Volgograd Oblast, Russia. The population was 10 as of 2010.

== Geography ==
Topolyovsky is located in steppe, 24 km northwest of Uryupinsk (the district's administrative centre) by road. Zaburdyayevsky is the nearest rural locality.
