= Bogomazovka =

Bogomazovka Богомазовка
- Khutor
- Location within Volgograd Oblast Location within Russia
- Coordinates: 48°23′N 42°18′E
- Country: Russia
- Region: Volgograd Oblast
- District: Chernyshkovsky District
- Time zone: UTC+4:00

Bogomazovka (Russian: Богомазовка) is a rural locality (a khutor) in Krasnoyarskoye Rural Settlement, Chernyshkovsky District, Volgograd Oblast, Russia. The population was 202 as of 2010. There are 4 streets.

== Geography ==
Bogomazovka is located on the left bank of the Tsimla River, 9 km southeast of Chernyshkovsky (the district's administrative centre) by road. Krasnoyarsky is the nearest rural locality.
