= Krasnoluchensky =

Krasnoluchensky Краснолученский
- Settlement
- Location within Volgograd Oblast Location within Russia
- Coordinates: 50°48′N 42°27′E
- Country: Russia
- Region: Volgograd Oblast
- District: Novonikolayevsky District
- Time zone: UTC+4:00

Krasnoluchensky (Russian: Краснолученский) is a rural locality (a settlement) in Serpo-Molotskoye Rural Settlement, Novonikolayevsky District, Volgograd Oblast, Russia. The population was 91 as of 2010. There are 4 streets.

== Geography ==
Krasnoluchensky is located in steppe, on the Khopyorsko-Buzulukskaya Plain, 25 km southeast of Novonikolayevsky (the district's administrative centre) by road. Kulikovsky is the nearest rural locality.
