= Bolshaya Osinovka =

Bolshaya Osinovka Большая Осиновка
- Khutor
- Location within Volgograd Oblast Location within Russia
- Coordinates: 49°11′N 42°39′E
- Country: Russia
- Region: Volgograd Oblast
- District: Kletsky District
- Time zone: UTC+4:00

Bolshaya Osinovka (Russian: Большая Осиновка) is a rural locality (a khutor) in Verkhnecherenskoye Rural Settlement, Kletsky District, Volgograd Oblast, Russia. The population was 226 as of 2010. There are 9 streets.

== Geography ==
Bolshaya Osinovka is located on the bank of the Kurtlak River, 35 km southwest of Kletskaya (the district's administrative centre) by road. Verkhnecherensky is the nearest rural locality.
