= Vyazovka, Sredneakhtubinsky District, Volgograd Oblast =

Vyazovka Вязовка
- Khutor
- Location within Volgograd Oblast Location within Russia
- Coordinates: 48°38′N 44°45′E
- Country: Russia
- Region: Volgograd Oblast
- District: Sredneakhtubinsky District
- Time zone: UTC+4:00

Vyazovka (Russian: Вязовка) is a rural locality (a khutor) in Kuybyshevskoye Rural Settlement, Sredneakhtubinsky District, Volgograd Oblast, Russia. The population was 167 as of 2010. There are 6 streets.

== Geography ==
Vyazovka is located 64 km northeast of Srednyaya Akhtuba (the district's administrative centre) by road. Rakhinka is the nearest rural locality.
