= Bolshoy Simkin =

Bolshoy Simkin Большой Симкин
- Khutor
- Location within Volgograd Oblast Location within Russia
- Coordinates: 48°53′N 46°39′E
- Country: Russia
- Region: Volgograd Oblast
- District: Pallasovsky District
- Time zone: UTC+4:00

Bolshoy Simkin (Russian: Большой Симкин) is a rural locality (a khutor) in Eltonskoye Rural Settlement, Pallasovsky District, Volgograd Oblast, Russia. The population was 295 as of 2010. There are 3 streets.

== Geography ==
Bolshoy Simkin is located 151 km south of Pallasovka (the district's administrative centre) by road. Saykhin is the nearest rural locality.
