= Mordvintsevo =

Mordvintsevo Мордвинцево
- Khutor
- Location within Volgograd Oblast Location within Russia
- Coordinates: 50°32′N 43°15′E
- Country: Russia
- Region: Volgograd Oblast
- District: Kikvidzensky District
- Time zone: UTC+4:00

Mordvintsevo (Russian: Мордвинцево) is a rural locality (a khutor) in Grishinskoye Rural Settlement, Kikvidzensky District, Volgograd Oblast, Russia. The population was 168 as of 2010. There are 2 streets.

== Geography ==
Mordvintsevo is located in steppe on Khopyorsko-Buzulukskaya plain, 27 km southeast of Preobrazhenskaya (the district's administrative centre) by road. Chistopol is the nearest rural locality.
