= Zheleznodorozhny razyezd 1062 =

Zheleznodorozhny razyezd 1062 Железнодорожный разъезд 1062
- Passing loop
- Location within Volgograd Oblast Location within Russia
- Coordinates: 50°25′N 46°54′E
- Country: Russia
- Region: Volgograd Oblast
- District: Staropoltavsky District
- Time zone: UTC+4:00

Zheleznodorozhny Razyezd 1062 (Russian: Железнодорожный разъезд 1062) is a rural locality (passing loop) in Gmelinskoye Rural Settlement, Staropoltavsky District, Volgograd Oblast, Russia. As of 2010, its population was 7.
