= Novokardailsky =

Novokardailsky Новокардаильский
- Khutor
- Location within Volgograd Oblast Location within Russia
- Coordinates: 50°58′N 42°38′E
- Country: Russia
- Region: Volgograd Oblast
- District: Novonikolayevsky District
- Time zone: UTC+4:00

Novokardailsky (Russian: Новокардаильский) is a rural locality (a khutor) in Komsomolskoye Rural Settlement, Novonikolayevsky District, Volgograd Oblast, Russia. The population was 266 as of 2010. There are 6 streets.

== Geography ==
Novokardailsky is located in the steppe, on the Khopyorsko-Buzulukskaya Plain, on the right bank of the Kardail River, 24 km east of Novonikolayevsky (the district's administrative centre) by road. Kleyevsky is the nearest rural locality.
