= Posyolok Uchkhoza Novoanninskogo Selkhoztekhnikuma =

Posyolok Uchkhoza Novoanninskogo Selkhoztekhnikuma Посёлок Учхоза Новоаннинского Сельхозтехникума
- Khutor
- Location within Volgograd Oblast Location within Russia
- Coordinates: 50°28′N 42°47′E
- Country: Russia
- Region: Volgograd Oblast
- District: Novoanninsky District
- Time zone: UTC+4:00

Posyolok Uchkhoza Novoanninskogo Selkhoztekhnikuma (Russian: Посёлок Учхоза Новоаннинского Сельхозтехникума) is a rural locality (a khutor) in Novoanninsky Urban Settlement, Novoanninsky District, Volgograd Oblast, Russia. The population was 8 as of 2010.

== Geography ==
The village is located in steppe on the Khopyorsko-Buzulukskaya Plain, 270 km from Volgograd, 16 km from Novoanninsky.
