= Nariman, Volgograd Oblast =

Nariman Нариман
- Settlement
- Location within Volgograd Oblast Location within Russia
- Coordinates: 48°28′N 44°12′E
- Country: Russia
- Region: Volgograd Oblast
- District: Svetloyarsky District
- Time zone: UTC+3:00

Nariman (Russian: Нариман) is a rural locality (a settlement) in Svetloyarsky District, Volgograd Oblast, Russia. The population was 1,426 as of 2010. There are 32 streets.

== Geography ==
Nariman is located 57 km west of Svetly Yar (the district's administrative centre) by road. Zarya is the nearest rural locality.
