= Zheltukhin =

Zheltukhin Желтухин
- Khutor
- Location within Volgograd Oblast Location within Russia
- Coordinates: 49°19′N 43°57′E
- Country: Russia
- Region: Volgograd Oblast
- District: Ilovlinsky District
- Time zone: UTC+4:00

Zheltukhin (Russian: Желтухин) is a rural locality (a khutor) in Avilovskoye Rural Settlement, Ilovlinsky District, Volgograd Oblast, Russia. The population was 463 as of 2010. There are 12 streets.

== Geography ==
Zheltukhin is located in steppe, on the right bank of the Ilovlya River, 4 km northwest of Ilovlya (the district's administrative centre) by road. Tary is the nearest rural locality.
