= Chapurniki =

Chapurniki Чапурники
- Station
- Location within Volgograd Oblast Location within Russia
- Coordinates: 48°27′N 44°30′E
- Country: Russia
- Region: Volgograd Oblast
- District: Svetloyarsky District
- Time zone: UTC+4:00

Chapurniki (Russian: Чапурники) is a rural locality (a station) in Svetloyarsky District, Volgograd Oblast, Russia. The population was 1,514 as of 2010. There are 44 streets.
