= Barminsky =

Barminsky Барминский
- Khutor
- Location within Volgograd Oblast Location within Russia
- Coordinates: 50°09′N 42°16′E
- Country: Russia
- Region: Volgograd Oblast
- District: Alexeyevsky District
- Time zone: UTC+4:00

Barminsky (Russian: Барминский) is a rural locality (a khutor) in Ust-Buzulukskoye Rural Settlement, Alexeyevsky District, Volgograd Oblast, Russia. The population was 211 as of 2010.

== Geography ==
Barminsky is located on the right bank of the Khopyor River, 20 km southeast of Alexeyevskaya (the district's administrative centre) by road. Titovsky is the nearest rural locality.
