= Troitsky, Mikhaylovka Urban Okrug, Volgograd Oblast =

Troitsky Троицкий
- Khutor
- Location within Volgograd Oblast Location within Russia
- Coordinates: 50°14′N 43°03′E
- Country: Russia
- Region: Volgograd Oblast
- District: Mikhaylovka Urban Okrug
- Time zone: UTC+4:00

Troitsky (Russian: Троицкий) is a rural locality (a khutor) in Mikhaylovka Urban Okrug, Volgograd Oblast, Russia. The population was 1,659 as of 2010. There are 28 streets.

== Geography ==
Troitsky is located 33 km northwest of Mikhaylovka. Rekonstruktsiya is the nearest rural locality.
