= Strakhovsky, Novoanninsky District, Volgograd Oblast =

Strakhovsky Страховский
- Khutor
- Location within Volgograd Oblast Location within Russia
- Coordinates: 50°27′N 43°01′E
- Country: Russia
- Region: Volgograd Oblast
- District: Novoanninsky District
- Time zone: UTC+4:00

Strakhovsky (Russian: Страховский) is a rural locality (a khutor) in Novokiyevskoye Rural Settlement, Novoanninsky District, Volgograd Oblast, Russia. The population was 31 as of 2010. There are 3 streets.

== Geography ==
Strakhovsky is located on the Khopyorsko-Buzulukskaya Plain, on the left bank of the Karman River, 46 km southeast of Novoanninsky (the district's administrative centre) by road. Burnatsky is the nearest rural locality.
