= Korostino =

Korostino Коростино
- Selo
- Location within Volgograd Oblast Location within Russia
- Coordinates: 50°10′N 44°56′E
- Country: Russia
- Region: Volgograd Oblast
- District: Kotovsky District
- Time zone: UTC+4:00

Korostino (Russian: Коростино) is a rural locality (a selo) and the administrative center of Korostinskoye Rural Settlement, Kotovsky District, Volgograd Oblast, Russia. The population was 1,133 as of 2010. There are 19 streets.

== Geography ==
Korostino is located 19 km southeast of Kotovo (the district's administrative centre) by road. Plemkhoz is the nearest rural locality.
