= Gonchary, Pallasovsky District, Volgograd Oblast =

Gonchary Гончары
- Khutor
- Location within Volgograd Oblast Location within Russia
- Coordinates: 49°46′N 46°34′E
- Country: Russia
- Region: Volgograd Oblast
- District: Pallasovsky District
- Time zone: UTC+4:00

Gonchary (Russian: Гончары) is a rural locality (a khutor) in Goncharovskoye Rural Settlement, Pallasovsky District, Volgograd Oblast, Russia. The population was 129 as of 2010. There are 2 streets.

== Geography ==
Gonchary is located 60 km southwest of Pallasovka (the district's administrative centre) by road. Zolotari is the nearest rural locality.
