= Rybovodny =

Rybovodny Рыбоводный
- Settlement
- Location within Volgograd Oblast Location within Russia
- Coordinates: 48°45′N 44°38′E
- Country: Russia
- Region: Volgograd Oblast
- District: Sredneakhtubinsky District
- Time zone: UTC+4:00

Rybovodny (Russian: Рыбоводный) is a rural locality (a settlement) in Kirovskoye Rural Settlement, Sredneakhtubinsky District, Volgograd Oblast, Russia. The population was 162 as of 2010. There are 4 streets.

== Geography ==
Rybovodny is located west of the Gniloy Erik, south from Zelyony Island, 25 km northwest of Srednyaya Akhtuba (the district's administrative centre) by road. Prikanalny is the nearest rural locality.
