= Cherkomasyev =

Cherkomasyev Чекомасьев
- Khutor
- Location within Volgograd Oblast Location within Russia
- Coordinates: 48°01′N 42°06′E
- Country: Russia
- Region: Volgograd Oblast
- District: Chernyshkovsky District
- Time zone: UTC+4:00

Cherkomasyev (Russian: Чекомасьев) is a rural locality (a khutor) in Basakinskoye Rural Settlement, Chernyshkovsky District, Volgograd Oblast, Russia. The population was 68 as of 2010. There are 2 streets.

== Geography ==
Cherkomasyev is located on the left bank of the Rossosh River, 59 km southwest of Chernyshkovsky (the district's administrative centre) by road. Basakin is the nearest rural locality.
