= Minayev, Volgograd Oblast =

Minayev Минаев
- Khutor
- Location within Volgograd Oblast Location within Russia
- Coordinates: 47°55′N 42°44′E
- Country: Russia
- Region: Volgograd Oblast
- District: Chernyshkovsky District
- Time zone: UTC+4:00

Minayev (Russian: Минаев) is a rural locality (a khutor) in Tormosinovskoye Rural Settlement, Chernyshkovsky District, Volgograd Oblast, Russia. The population was 4 as of 2010.

== Geography ==
Minayev is located in southwest of Vologda Oblast, 78 km southeast of the Chernyshkovsky (the district's administrative centre) by road. Komarov is the nearest rural locality.
