= Novaya Bakhmetyevka =

Novaya Bakhmetyevka Новая Бахметьевка
- Selo
- Location within Volgograd Oblast Location within Russia
- Coordinates: 51°05′N 44°45′E
- Country: Russia
- Region: Volgograd Oblast
- District: Zhirnovsky District
- Time zone: UTC+4:00

Novaya Bakhmetyevka (Russian: Новая Бахметьевка) is a rural locality (a selo) in Alexandrovskoye Rural Settlement, Zhirnovsky District, Volgograd Oblast, Russia. The population was 92 as of 2010.

== Geography ==
Novaya Bakhmetyevka is located on the right bank of the Medveditsa River, 17 km north of Zhirnovsk (the district's administrative centre) by road. Bolshaya Knyazevka is the nearest rural locality. A vacant church building sits near the east border.
