= Bespalovsky, Volgograd Oblast =

Bespalovsky Беспаловский
- Khutor
- Location within Volgograd Oblast Location within Russia
- Coordinates: 50°52′N 41°31′E
- Country: Russia
- Region: Volgograd Oblast
- District: Uryupinsky District
- Time zone: UTC+4:00

Bespalovsky (Russian: Беспаловский) is a rural locality (a khutor) and the administrative center of Bespalovskoye Rural Settlement, Uryupinsky District, Volgograd Oblast, Russia. The population was 528 as of 2010. There are 5 streets.

== Geography ==
Bespalovsky is located in steppe, 46 km northwest of Uryupinsk (the district's administrative centre) by road. Baltinovsky is the nearest rural locality.
