= Bolshoy, Serafimovichsky District, Volgograd Oblast =

Bolshoy Большой
- Khutor
- Location within Volgograd Oblast Location within Russia
- Coordinates: 49°22′N 42°19′E
- Country: Russia
- Region: Volgograd Oblast
- District: Serafimovichsky District
- Time zone: UTC+4:00

Bolshoy (Russian: Большой) is a rural locality (a khutor) and the administrative center of Bolshovskoye Rural Settlement, Serafimovichsky District, Volgograd Oblast, Russia. The population was 1,322 as of 2010. There are 30 streets.

== Geography ==
Bolshoy is located on the Tsutskan River, 49 km southwest of Serafimovich (the district's administrative centre) by road. Zatonsky is the nearest rural locality.
