= Leskhoz 5-y =

Leskhoz 5-y Лесхоз 5-й
- Settlement
- Location within Volgograd Oblast Location within Russia
- Coordinates: 48°29′N 45°16′E
- Country: Russia
- Region: Volgograd Oblast
- District: Leninsky District
- Time zone: UTC+4:00

Leskhoz 5-y (Russian: Лесхоз 5-й) is a rural locality (a settlement) in Karshevitskoye Rural Settlement, Leninsky District, Volgograd Oblast, Russia. The population was 6 as of 2010.
