= Posyolok Valuyevskoy Opytno-Meliorativnoy Stantsii =

Posyolok Valuyevskoy Opytno-Meliorativnoy Stantsii Посёлок Валуевской Опытно-Мелиоративной Станции
- Settlement
- Location within Volgograd Oblast Location within Russia
- Coordinates: 50°22′N 46°28′E
- Country: Russia
- Region: Volgograd Oblast
- District: Staropoltavsky District
- Time zone: UTC+4:00

Posyolok Valuyevskoy Opytno-Meliorativnoy Stantsii (Russian: Посёлок Валуевской Опытно-Мелиоративной Станции) is a rural locality (a settlement) in Novotikhonovskoye Rural Settlement, Staropoltavsky District, Volgograd Oblast, Russia. The population was 28 as of 2010. There are 2 streets.

== Geography ==
The settlement is located on the right bank of the Solyonaya Kuba, 16 km south of Staraya Poltavka (the district's administrative centre) by road. Peschanka is the nearest rural locality.
