= Sinyapkinsky =

Sinyapkinsky Синяпкинский
- Khutor
- Location within Volgograd Oblast Location within Russia
- Coordinates: 48°30′N 42°29′E
- Country: Russia
- Region: Volgograd Oblast
- District: Surovikinsky District
- Time zone: UTC+4:00

Sinyapkinsky (Russian: Синяпкинский) is a rural locality (a khutor) in Sysoyevskoye Rural Settlement, Surovikinsky District, Volgograd Oblast, Russia. The population was 117 as of 2010. There are 3 streets.

== Geography ==
Sinyapkinsky is located near the Chir River, 43 km southwest of Surovikino (the district's administrative centre) by road. Oblivskaya is the nearest rural locality.
