= Prigarino =

Prigarino Пригарино
- Settlement
- Location within Volgograd Oblast Location within Russia
- Coordinates: 50°14′N 46°37′E
- Country: Russia
- Region: Volgograd Oblast
- District: Pallasovsky District
- Time zone: UTC+4:00

Prigarino (Russian: Пригарино) is a rural locality (a settlement) in Romashkovksoye Rural Settlement, Pallasovsky District, Volgograd Oblast, Russia. The population was 140 as of 2010.

== Geography ==
The village is located on the Caspian Depression, in the left bank of the Yama River, 6.5 km from Romashki, 30 km from Pallasovka, 310 km from Volgograd.
