= Glushitsa =

Glushitsa Глушица
- Khutor
- Location within Volgograd Oblast Location within Russia
- Coordinates: 49°51′N 42°33′E
- Country: Russia
- Region: Volgograd Oblast
- District: Kumylzhensky District
- Time zone: UTC+4:00

Glushitsa (Russian: Глушица) is a rural locality (a khutor) in Kumylzhenskoye Rural Settlement, Kumylzhensky District, Volgograd Oblast, Russia. The population was 157 as of 2010. There are 3 streets.

== Geography ==
Glushitsa is located in forest steppe, on Khopyorsko-Buzulukskaya Plain, on the bank of the Khopyor River, 4 km southwest of Kumylzhenskaya (the district's administrative centre) by road. Kumylzhenskaya is the nearest rural locality.
