= Toryanoye =

Toryanoye Торяное
- Selo
- Location within Volgograd Oblast Location within Russia
- Coordinates: 51°02′N 43°31′E
- Country: Russia
- Region: Volgograd Oblast
- District: Yelansky District
- Time zone: UTC+4:00

Toryanoye (Russian: Торяное) is a rural locality (a selo) in Dubovskoye Rural Settlement, Yelansky District, Volgograd Oblast, Russia. The population was 344 as of 2010. There are 9 streets.

== Geography ==
Toryanoye is located on Khopyorsko-Buzulukskaya Plain, on the bank of the Yelan River, 22 km northwest of Yelan (the district's administrative centre) by road. Babinkino is the nearest rural locality.
