= Golensky =

Golensky Голенский
- Khutor
- Location within Volgograd Oblast Location within Russia
- Coordinates: 49°31′N 43°48′E
- Country: Russia
- Region: Volgograd Oblast
- District: Ilovlinsky District
- Time zone: UTC+4:00

Golensky (Russian: Голенский) is a rural locality (a khutor) in Logovskoye Rural Settlement, Ilovlinsky District, Volgograd Oblast, Russia. The population was 1 as of 2010. There is 1 street.

== Geography ==
The village is located in steppe, on south of Volga Upland.
