= Bezrechny =

Bezrechny Безречный
- Khutor
- Location within Volgograd Oblast Location within Russia
- Coordinates: 50°39′N 43°13′E
- Country: Russia
- Region: Volgograd Oblast
- District: Kikvidzensky District
- Time zone: UTC+4:00

Bezrechny (Russian: Безречный) is a rural locality (a khutor) in Grishinskoye Rural Settlement, Kikvidzensky District, Volgograd Oblast, Russia. The population was 81 as of 2010. There are 2 streets.

== Geography ==
Bezrechny is located 19 km southeast of Preobrazhenskaya (the district's administrative centre) by road. Grishin is the nearest rural locality.
