= Strakhovsky =

Strakhovsky Страховский
- Khutor
- Location within Volgograd Oblast Location within Russia
- Coordinates: 50°18′N 42°59′E
- Country: Russia
- Region: Volgograd Oblast
- District: Mikhaylovka Urban Okrug
- Time zone: UTC+4:00

Strakhovsky (Russian: Страховский) is a rural locality (a khutor) in Mikhaylovka Urban Okrug, Volgograd Oblast, Russia. The population was 314 as of 2010. There are 9 streets.

== Geography ==
Strakhovsky is located 42 km northwest of Mikhaylovka. Novoselsky is the nearest rural locality.
