= Tersinka =

Tersinka Терсинка
- Selo
- Location within Volgograd Oblast Location within Russia
- Coordinates: 50°45′N 44°39′E
- Country: Russia
- Region: Volgograd Oblast
- District: Rudnyansky District
- Time zone: UTC+4:00

Tersinka (Russian: Терсинка) is a rural locality (a selo) in Rudnyanskoye Urban Settlement, Rudnyansky District, Volgograd Oblast, Russia. The population was 67 as of 2010. There is 1 street.

== Geography ==
Tersinka is located in forest steppe, on the right bank of the Tersa River, 13 km southeast of Rudnya (the district's administrative centre) by road. Tersinka is the nearest rural locality.
