= Zinovyev, Volgograd Oblast =

Zinovyev Зиновьев
- Khutor
- Location within Volgograd Oblast Location within Russia
- Coordinates: 50°00′N 42°57′E
- Country: Russia
- Region: Volgograd Oblast
- District: Mikhaylovka Urban Okrug
- Time zone: UTC+4:00

Zinovyev (Russian: Зиновьев) is a rural locality (a khutor) in Mikhaylovka Urban Okrug, Volgograd Oblast, Russia. The population was 90 as of 2010. There are 3 streets.

== Geography ==
Zinovyev is located 35 km southwest of Mikhaylovka. Senichkin is the nearest rural locality.
