= Bolshemedvedevsky =

Bolshemedvedevsky Большемедведевский
- Khutor
- Location within Volgograd Oblast Location within Russia
- Coordinates: 50°13′N 43°09′E
- Country: Russia
- Region: Volgograd Oblast
- District: Mikhaylovka Urban Okrug
- Time zone: UTC+4:00

Bolshemedvedevsky (Russian: Большемедведевский) is a rural locality (a khutor) in Mikhaylovka Urban Okrug, Volgograd Oblast, Russia. The population was 114 as of 2010. There are 9 streets.

== Geography ==
Bolshemedvedevsky is located 43 km northwest of Mikhaylovka. Rekonstruktsiya is the nearest rural locality.
