= Maksima Gorkogo =

Maksima Gorkogo Максима Горького
- Settlement
- Location within Volgograd Oblast Location within Russia
- Coordinates: 48°56′N 45°08′E
- Country: Russia
- Region: Volgograd Oblast
- District: Sredneakhtubinsky District
- Time zone: UTC+4:00

Maksima Gorkogo (Russian: Максима Горького) is a rural locality (a settlement) in Krasnooktyabrskoye Rural Settlement, Sredneakhtubinsky District, Volgograd Oblast, Russia. The population was 367 as of 2010.
