= Bezymyanka, Volgograd Oblast =

Bezymyanka Безымянка
- Khutor
- Location within Volgograd Oblast Location within Russia
- Coordinates: 49°54′N 43°15′E
- Country: Russia
- Region: Volgograd Oblast
- District: Mikhaylovka Urban Okrug
- Time zone: UTC+4:00

Bezymyanka (Russian: Безымянка) is a rural locality (a khutor) in Mikhaylovka Urban Okrug, Volgograd Oblast, Russia. The population was 1,718 as of 2010. There are 43 streets.

== Geography ==
Bezymyanka is located 30 km south of Mikhaylovka. Abramov is the nearest rural locality.
