= Prikanalny =

Prikanalny Приканальный
- Settlement
- Location within Volgograd Oblast Location within Russia
- Coordinates: 48°40′N 43°49′E
- Country: Russia
- Region: Volgograd Oblast
- District: Kalachyovsky District
- Time zone: UTC+4:00

Prikanalny (Russian: Приканальный) is a rural locality (a settlement) in Marinovskoye Rural Settlement, Kalachyovsky District, Volgograd Oblast, Russia. The population was 184 as of 2010. There are 7 streets.

== Geography ==
Prikanalny is located 25 km east of Kalach-na-Donu (the district's administrative centre) by road. Marinovka is the nearest rural locality.
