= Maly Dubovsky =

Maly Dubovsky Малый Дубовский
- Khutor
- Location within Volgograd Oblast Location within Russia
- Coordinates: 50°36′N 42°15′E
- Country: Russia
- Region: Volgograd Oblast
- District: Novoanninsky District
- Time zone: UTC+4:00

Maly Dubovsky (Russian: Малый Дубовский) is a rural locality (a khutor) in Deminskoye Rural Settlement, Novoanninsky District, Volgograd Oblast, Russia. The population was 33 as of 2010.

== Geography ==
Maly Dubovsky is located in steppe on the Khopyorsko-Buzulukskaya Plain, 45 km northwest of Novoanninsky (the district's administrative centre) by road. Deminsky is the nearest rural locality.
