= Bakhtiyarovka =

Bakhtiyarovka Бахтияровка
- Selo
- Location within Volgograd Oblast Location within Russia
- Coordinates: 48°42′N 45°08′E
- Country: Russia
- Region: Volgograd Oblast
- District: Leninsky District
- Time zone: UTC+4:00

Bakhtiyarovka (Russian: Бахтияровка) is a rural locality (selo) and the administrative center of Bakhtiyarovskoye Rural Settlement, Leninsky District, Volgograd Oblast, Russia. The population was 822 as of 2010. There are 12 streets.

== Geography ==
Bakhtiyarovka is located on the left bank of the Akhtuba River, 8 km northwest of Leninsk (the district's administrative centre) by road. Leninsk is the nearest rural locality.
