= Lobakin =

Lobakin Лобакин
- Khutor
- Location within Volgograd Oblast Location within Russia
- Coordinates: 48°47′N 42°50′E
- Country: Russia
- Region: Volgograd Oblast
- District: Surovikinsky District
- Time zone: UTC+4:00

Lobakin (Russian: Лобакин) is a rural locality (a khutor) and the administrative center of Lobakinskoye Rural Settlement, Surovikinsky District, Volgograd Oblast, Russia. The population was 1,022 as of 2010. There are 22 streets.

== Geography ==
Lobakin is located near the Dobraya River, 28 km north of Surovikino (the district's administrative centre) by road. Dobrinka is the nearest rural locality.
