= Nizhneantoshinsky =

Nizhneantoshinsky Нижнеантошинский
- Khutor
- Location within Volgograd Oblast Location within Russia
- Coordinates: 50°50′N 41°39′E
- Country: Russia
- Region: Volgograd Oblast
- District: Uryupinsky District
- Time zone: UTC+4:00

Nizhneantoshinsky (Russian: Нижнеантошинский) is a rural locality (a khutor) in Verkhnebezymyanovskoye Rural Settlement, Uryupinsky District, Volgograd Oblast, Russia. The population was 140 as of 2010. There are 2 streets.

== Geography ==
Nizhneantoshinsky is located 36 km northwest of Uryupinsk (the district's administrative centre) by road. Grigoryevsky is the nearest rural locality.
