= Novodobrinka =

Novodobrinka Новодобринка
- Khutor
- Location within Volgograd Oblast Location within Russia
- Coordinates: 51°01′N 44°09′E
- Country: Russia
- Region: Volgograd Oblast
- District: Yelansky District
- Time zone: UTC+4:00

Novodobrinka (Russian: Новодобринка) is a rural locality (a khutor) in Moretskoye Rural Settlement, Yelansky District, Volgograd Oblast, Russia. The population was 107 as of 2010.

== Geography ==
Novodobrinka is located on Khopyorsko-Buzulukskaya Plain, on the left bank of the Egorovka River, 39 km northeast of Yelan (the district's administrative centre) by road. Khvoshchinka is the nearest rural locality.
