= Rechensky =

Rechensky Реченский
- Khutor
- Location within Volgograd Oblast Location within Russia
- Coordinates: 50°10′N 42°01′E
- Country: Russia
- Region: Volgograd Oblast
- District: Alexeyevsky District
- Time zone: UTC+4:00

Rechensky (Russian: Реченский) is a rural locality (a khutor) and the administrative center of Rechenskoye Rural Settlement, Alexeyevsky District, Volgograd Oblast, Russia. The population was 408 as of 2010.

== Geography ==
Rechensky is located on the right bank of the Akishevka River, 29 km southwest from Alexeyevskaya (the district's administrative centre) by road. Nesterovsky is the nearest rural locality.
