= Sigayevsky =

Sigayevsky Сигаевский
- Khutor
- Location within Volgograd Oblast Location within Russia
- Coordinates: 49°54′N 42°40′E
- Country: Russia
- Region: Volgograd Oblast
- District: Kumylzhensky District
- Time zone: UTC+4:00

Sigayevsky (Russian: Сигаевский) is a rural locality (a khutor) in Kumylzhenskoye Rural Settlement, Kumylzhensky District, Volgograd Oblast, Russia. The population was 10 as of 2010.

== Geography ==
Sigayevsky is located in forest steppe, on Khopyorsko-Buzulukskaya Plain, on the bank of the Sukhodol River, 12 km northeast of Kumylzhenskaya (the district's administrative centre) by road. Kumylzhenskaya is the nearest rural locality.
