= Kachalin, Volgograd Oblast =

Kachalin Качалин
- Khutor
- Location within Volgograd Oblast Location within Russia
- Coordinates: 48°44′N 43°11′E
- Country: Russia
- Region: Volgograd Oblast
- District: Surovikinsky District
- Time zone: UTC+4:00

Kachalin (Russian: Качалин) is a rural locality (a khutor) and the administrative center of Kachalinskoye Rural Settlement, Surovikinsky District, Volgograd Oblast, Russia. The population was 422 as of 2010. There are 6 streets.

== Geography ==
Kachalin is located on the Liska River, 38 km northeast of Surovikino (the district's administrative centre) by road. Ostrov is the nearest rural locality.
