= Kleymenovsky =

Kleymenovsky Клейменовский
- Khutor
- Location within Volgograd Oblast Location within Russia
- Coordinates: 50°31′N 42°24′E
- Country: Russia
- Region: Volgograd Oblast
- District: Novoanninsky District
- Time zone: UTC+4:00

Kleymenovsky (Russian: Клейменовский) is a rural locality (a khutor) in Deminskoye Rural Settlement, Novoanninsky District, Volgograd Oblast, Russia. The population was 123 as of 2010.

== Geography ==
Kleymenovsky is located in forest steppe on the Khopyorsko-Buzulukskaya Plain, on the Panika River, 31 km west of Novoanninsky (the district's administrative centre) by road. Yaryzhensky is the nearest rural locality.
