= Miusovo =

Miusovo Миусово
- Selo
- Location within Volgograd Oblast Location within Russia
- Coordinates: 50°25′N 44°03′E
- Country: Russia
- Region: Volgograd Oblast
- District: Danilovsky District
- Time zone: UTC+4:00

Miusovo (Russian: Миусово) is a rural locality (a selo) and the administrative center of Miusovskoye Rural Settlement, Danilovsky District, Volgograd Oblast, Russia. The population was 187 as of 2010. There are 6 streets.

== Geography ==
The village is located in steppe, 11 km from Danilovka and 250 km from Volgograd.
