= Maximovka, Volgograd Oblast =

Maximovka Максимовка
- Khutor
- Location within Volgograd Oblast Location within Russia
- Coordinates: 50°09′N 47°11′E
- Country: Russia
- Region: Volgograd Oblast
- District: Pallasovsky District
- Time zone: UTC+4:00

Maximovka (Russian: Максимовка) is a rural locality (a khutor) in Savinskoye Rural Settlement, Pallasovsky District, Volgograd Oblast, Russia. The population was 66 as of 2010. There are 4 streets.

== Geography ==
Maximovka is located on the right bank of the Torgun River, 35 km northeast of Pallasovka (the district's administrative centre) by road. Kumysolechebnitsa is the nearest rural locality.
