= Budarka =

Budarka Бударка
- Khutor
- Location within Volgograd Oblast Location within Russia
- Coordinates: 47°30′N 43°28′E
- Country: Russia
- Region: Volgograd Oblast
- District: Kotelnikovsky District
- Time zone: UTC+4:00

Budarka (Russian: Бударка) is a rural locality (a khutor) in Poperechenskoye Rural Settlement, Kotelnikovsky District, Volgograd Oblast, Russia. The population was 39 as of 2010.

== Geography ==
Budarka is located 36 km southeast of Kotelnikovo (the district's administrative centre) by road. Poperechny is the nearest rural locality.
