= Popov, Uryupinsky District, Volgograd Oblast =

Popov Попов
- Khutor
- Location within Volgograd Oblast Location within Russia
- Coordinates: 50°50′N 42°02′E
- Country: Russia
- Region: Volgograd Oblast
- District: Uryupinsky District
- Time zone: UTC+4:00

Popov (Russian: Попов) is a rural locality (a khutor) in Olshanskoye Rural Settlement, Uryupinsky District, Volgograd Oblast, Russia. The population was 954 as of 2010. There are 19 streets.

== Geography ==
Popov is located in forest steppe, on the right bank of the Olshanka River, 6 km northeast of Uryupinsk (the district's administrative centre) by road. Olshanka is the nearest rural locality.
