= Popov, Danilovsky District, Volgograd Oblast =

Popov Попов
- Khutor
- Location within Volgograd Oblast Location within Russia
- Coordinates: 50°22′N 44°25′E
- Country: Russia
- Region: Volgograd Oblast
- District: Danilovsky District
- Time zone: UTC+4:00

Popov (Russian: Попов) is a rural locality (a khutor) in Ostrovskoye Rural Settlement, Danilovsky District, Volgograd Oblast, Russia. The population was 113 as of 2010. There are 2 streets.

== Geography ==
Popov is located in forest steppe, on the Lomovka River, 41 km northwest of Danilovka (the district's administrative centre) by road. Nizhniye Korobki is the nearest rural locality.
