= Chunosovsky =

Chunosovsky Чуносовский
- Khutor
- Location within Volgograd Oblast Location within Russia
- Coordinates: 49°55′N 42°35′E
- Country: Russia
- Region: Volgograd Oblast
- District: Kumylzhensky District
- Time zone: UTC+4:00

Chunosovsky (Russian: Чуносовский) is a rural locality (a khutor) in Kumylzhenskoye Rural Settlement, Kumylzhensky District, Volgograd Oblast, Russia. The population was 14 in 2010. There are three streets.

== Geography ==
Chunosovsky is located in forest steppe, on Khopyorsko-Buzulukskaya Plain, on the bank of the Kumylga River, 9 km north of Kumylzhenskaya (the district's administrative centre) by road. Golovsky is the nearest rural locality.
