= Kosovsky =

Kosovsky Косовский
- Khutor
- Location within Volgograd Oblast Location within Russia
- Coordinates: 50°33′N 42°16′E
- Country: Russia
- Region: Volgograd Oblast
- District: Novoanninsky District
- Time zone: UTC+4:00

Kosovsky (Russian: Косовский) is a rural locality (a khutor) in Deminskoye Rural Settlement, Novoanninsky District, Volgograd Oblast, Russia. The population was 98 as of 2010. There are 2 streets.

== Geography ==
Kosovsky is located in steppe on the Khopyorsko-Buzulukskaya Plain, 40 km west of Novoanninsky (the district's administrative centre) by road. Martynovsky is the nearest rural locality.
