= Nizhny Balykley =

Nizhny Balykley Нижний Балыклей
- Selo
- Location within Volgograd Oblast Location within Russia
- Coordinates: 49°29′N 45°08′E
- Country: Russia
- Region: Volgograd Oblast
- District: Bykovsky District
- Time zone: UTC+4:00

Nizhny Balykley (Russian: Нижний Балыклей) is a rural locality (a selo) in Verkhnebalykleyskoye Rural Settlement, Bykovsky District, Volgograd Oblast, Russia. The population was 96 as of 2010.

== Geography ==
Nizhny Balykley is located on the bank of the Volga River, 41 km south of Bykovo (the district's administrative centre) by road. Verkhny Balykley is the nearest rural locality.
