= Zhukovsky, Sulyayevskoye Rural Settlement, Kumylzhensky District, Volgograd Oblast =

Zhukovsky Жуковский
- Khutor
- Location within Volgograd Oblast Location within Russia
- Coordinates: 50°05′N 42°37′E
- Country: Russia
- Region: Volgograd Oblast
- District: Kumylzhensky District
- Time zone: UTC+4:00

Zhukovsky (Russian: Жуковский) is a rural locality (a khutor) in Sulyayevskoye Rural Settlement, Kumylzhensky District, Volgograd Oblast, Russia. The population was 89 as of 2010.

== Geography ==
The village is located in forest steppe, on Khopyorsko-Buzulukskaya Plain, on the bank of the Kumylga River.
