= Grudne-Yermaki =

Grudne-Yermaki Грудне-Ермаки
- Khutor
- Location within Volgograd Oblast Location within Russia
- Coordinates: 51°03′N 42°47′E
- Country: Russia
- Region: Volgograd Oblast
- District: Novonikolayevsky District
- Time zone: UTC+4:00

Grudne-Yermaki (Russian: Грудне-Ермаки) is a rural locality (a khutor) in Khopyorskoye Rural Settlement, Novonikolayevsky District, Volgograd Oblast, Russia. The population was 50 as of 2010.

== Geography ==
Grudne-Yermaki is located on the Khopyorsko-Buzulukskaya Plain, 45 km ENE of Novonikolayevsky (the district's administrative centre) by road. Khopyorsky is the nearest rural locality.
