= Komarov, Volgograd Oblast =

Komarov Комаров
- Khutor
- Location within Volgograd Oblast Location within Russia
- Coordinates: 47°54′N 42°42′E
- Country: Russia
- Region: Volgograd Oblast
- District: Chernyshkovsky District
- Time zone: UTC+4:00

Komarov (Russian: Комаров) is a rural locality (a khutor) in Tomosinovskoye Rural Settlement, Chernyshkovsky District, Volgograd Oblast, Russia. The population was 28 as of 2010.

== Geography ==
Komarov is located in the steppe, 81 km southeast of Chernyshkovsky (the district's administrative centre) by road. Tormosin is the nearest rural locality.
