= Yarki-Rubezhny =

Yarki-Rubezhny Ярки-Рубежный
- Khutor
- Location within Volgograd Oblast Location within Russia
- Coordinates: 48°25′N 43°54′E
- Country: Russia
- Region: Volgograd Oblast
- District: Kalachyovsky District
- Time zone: UTC+4:00

Yarki-Rubezhny (Russian: Ярки-Рубежный) is a rural locality (a khutor) in Buzinovskoye Rural Settlement, Kalachyovsky District, Volgograd Oblast, Russia. The population was 175 as of 2010. There are 5 streets.

== Geography ==
Yarki-Rubezhny is located on the left bank of the Donskaya Tsaritsa River, 58 km southeast of Kalach-na-Donu (the district's administrative centre) by road. Stepanevka is the nearest rural locality.
