= Melovatka =

Melovatka Меловатка
- Selo
- Location within Volgograd Oblast Location within Russia
- Coordinates: 50°52′N 44°41′E
- Country: Russia
- Region: Volgograd Oblast
- District: Zhirnovsky District
- Time zone: UTC+4:00

Melovatka (Russian: Меловатка) is a rural locality (a selo) and the administrative center of Melovatskoye Rural Settlement, Zhirnovsky District, Volgograd Oblast, Russia. The population was 341 as of 2010. There are 3 streets.

== Geography ==
Melovatka is located 24 km southwest of Zhirnovsk (the district's administrative centre) by road. Nizhnyaya Dobrinka is the nearest rural locality.
