= Kozlov, Kumylzhensky District, Volgograd Oblast =

Kozlov Козлов
- Khutor
- Location within Volgograd Oblast Location within Russia
- Coordinates: 49°43′N 42°40′E
- Country: Russia
- Region: Volgograd Oblast
- District: Kumylzhensky District
- Time zone: UTC+4:00

Kozlov (Russian: Козлов) is a rural locality (a khutor) in Krasnyanskoye Rural Settlement, Kumylzhensky District, Volgograd Oblast, Russia. The population was 213 as of 2010. There are 4 streets.

== Geography ==
Kozlov is located in forest steppe, on Khopyorsko-Buzulukskaya Plain, 46 km southeast of Kumylzhenskaya (the district's administrative centre) by road. Krasnyansky is the nearest rural locality.
