= Verkhnebezymyansky =

Verkhnebezymyansky Верхнебезымянский
- Khutor
- Location within Volgograd Oblast Location within Russia
- Coordinates: 50°46′N 41°41′E
- Country: Russia
- Region: Volgograd Oblast
- District: Uryupinsky District
- Time zone: UTC+4:00

Verkhnebezymyansky (Russian: Верхнебезымянский) is a rural locality (a khutor) and the administrative center of Verkhnebezymyanovskoye Rural Settlement, Uryupinsky District, Volgograd Oblast, Russia. The population was 569 as of 2010. There are 14 streets.

== Geography ==
Verkhnebezymyansky is located in forest steppe, 37 km southwest of Uryupinsk (the district's administrative centre) by road. Verkhneantoshinsky is the nearest rural locality.
