= Buyerak-Popovsky =

Buyerak-Popovsky Буерак-Поповский
- Khutor
- Location within Volgograd Oblast Location within Russia
- Coordinates: 49°33′N 42°36′E
- Country: Russia
- Region: Volgograd Oblast
- District: Serafimovichsky District
- Time zone: UTC+4:00

Buyerak-Popovsky (Russian: Буерак-Поповский) is a rural locality (a khutor) and the administrative center of Buyerak-Popovskoye Rural Settlement, Serafimovichsky District, Volgograd Oblast, Russia. The population was 499 as of 2010. There are 7 streets.

== Geography ==
Buyerak-Popovsky is located near the Don River, 14 km southwest of Serafimovich (the district's administrative centre) by road. Buyerak-Senyutkin is the nearest rural locality.
