= Ust-Pogozhye =

Ust-Pogozhye Усть-Погожье
- Selo
- Location within Volgograd Oblast Location within Russia
- Coordinates: 49°28′N 44°37′E
- Country: Russia
- Region: Volgograd Oblast
- District: Dubovsky District
- Time zone: UTC+4:00

Ust-Pogozhye (Russian: Усть-Погожье) is a rural locality (a selo) and the administrative center of Ust-Pogozhinskoye Rural Settlement, Dubovsky District, Volgograd Oblast, Russia. The population was 1,067 as of 2010. There are 14 streets.

== Geography ==
Ust-Pogozhye is located in steppe, on the right bank of the Pogozhaya River, 66 km northwest of Dubovka (the district's administrative centre) by road. Semyonovka is the nearest rural locality.
