= Blinkovsky =

Blinkovsky Блинковский
- Khutor
- Location within Volgograd Oblast Location within Russia
- Coordinates: 49°59′N 42°09′E
- Country: Russia
- Region: Volgograd Oblast
- District: Kumylzhensky District
- Time zone: UTC+4:00

Blinkovsky (Russian: Блинковский) is a rural locality (a khutor) in Popovskoye Rural Settlement, Kumylzhensky District, Volgograd Oblast, Russia. The population was 37 as of 2010.

== Geography ==
Blinkovsky is located in forest steppe, on Khopyorsko-Buzulukskaya Plain, on the bank of the Yedovlya River, 51 km northwest of Kumylzhenskaya (the district's administrative centre) by road. Olkhovsky is the nearest rural locality.
