= Kalinina, Sredneakhtubinsky District, Volgograd Oblast =

Kalinina Калинина
- Settlement
- Location within Volgograd Oblast Location within Russia
- Coordinates: 48°40′N 44°55′E
- Country: Russia
- Region: Volgograd Oblast
- District: Sredneakhtubinsky District
- Time zone: UTC+4:00

Kalinina (Russian: Калинина) is a rural locality (a settlement) in Krasnoye Rural Settlement, Sredneakhtubinsky District, Volgograd Oblast, Russia. The population was 427 as of 2010. There are 33 streets.

== Geography ==
Kalinina is located 14 km southeast of Srednyaya Akhtuba (the district's administrative centre) by road. Krasny Sad is the nearest rural locality.
