= Baltinovsky =

Baltinovsky Балтиновский
- Khutor
- Location within Volgograd Oblast Location within Russia
- Coordinates: 50°50′N 41°33′E
- Country: Russia
- Region: Volgograd Oblast
- District: Uryupinsky District
- Time zone: UTC+4:00

Baltinovsky (Russian: Балтиновский) is a rural locality (a khutor) in Bespalovskoye Rural Settlement, Uryupinsky District, Volgograd Oblast, Russia. The population was 11 as of 2010.

== Geography ==
Baltinovsky is located 48 km northwest of Uryupinsk (the district's administrative centre) by road. Bespalovsky is the nearest rural locality.
