= Rog-Izmaylovsky =

Rog-Izmaylovsky Рог-Измайловский
- Khutor
- Location within Volgograd Oblast Location within Russia
- Coordinates: 50°39′N 42°44′E
- Country: Russia
- Region: Volgograd Oblast
- District: Novoanninsky District
- Time zone: UTC+4:00

Rog-Izmaylovsky (Russian: Рог-Измайловский) is a rural locality (a khutor) in Krasnokorotkovskoye Rural Settlement, Novoanninsky District, Volgograd Oblast, Russia. The population was 336 as of 2010. There are 7 streets.

== Geography ==
Rog-Izmaylovsky is located on the Khopyorsko-Buzulukskaya Plain, on the Rog Leka, 19 km northeast of Novoanninsky (the district's administrative centre) by road. Alsyapinsky is the nearest rural locality.
