= Bocharovsky =

Bocharovsky Бочаровский
- Khutor
- Location within Volgograd Oblast Location within Russia
- Coordinates: 50°23′N 42°39′E
- Country: Russia
- Region: Volgograd Oblast
- District: Novoanninsky District
- Time zone: UTC+4:00

Bocharovsky (Russian: Бочаровский) is a rural locality (a khutor) and the administrative center of Bocharovskoye Rural Settlement, Novoanninsky District, Volgograd Oblast, Russia. The population was 583 as of 2010. There are 15 streets.

== Geography ==
Bocharovsky is located in steppe on the Khopyorsko-Buzulukskaya Plain, 250 km from Volgograd, 19 km south of Novoanninsky (the district's administrative centre) by road. Kuznetsovsky is the nearest rural locality.
