= Lozhki, Volgograd Oblast =

Lozhki Ложки
- Khutor
- Location within Volgograd Oblast Location within Russia
- Coordinates: 48°45′N 43°22′E
- Country: Russia
- Region: Volgograd Oblast
- District: Kalachyovsky District
- Time zone: UTC+4:00

Lozhki (Russian: Ложки) is a rural locality (a khutor) in Pyatiizbyanskoye Rural Settlement, Kalachyovsky District, Volgograd Oblast, Russia, just off the Don River. The population was 36 as of 2010.

== Geography ==
Lozhki is located 20 km northwest of Kalach-na-Donu (the district's administrative centre) by road. Svetly Log is the nearest rural locality.
