= Sadovy, Svetloyarsky District, Volgograd Oblast =

Sadovy Садовый
- Settlement
- Location within Volgograd Oblast Location within Russia
- Coordinates: 48°29′N 44°40′E
- Country: Russia
- Region: Volgograd Oblast
- District: Svetloyarsky District
- Time zone: UTC+4:00

Sadovy (Russian: Садовый) is a rural locality (a settlement) in Svetloyarsky District, Volgograd Oblast, Russia. The population was 53 as of 2010.
