= Bobrovsky 2-y =

Bobrovsky 2-y Бобровский 2-й
- Khutor
- Location within Volgograd Oblast Location within Russia
- Coordinates: 49°29′N 42°45′E
- Country: Russia
- Region: Volgograd Oblast
- District: Serafimovichsky District
- Time zone: UTC+4:00

Bobrovsky 2-y (Russian: Бобровский 2-й) is a rural locality (a khutor) and the administrative center of Bobrovskoye Rural Settlement, Serafimovichsky District, Volgograd Oblast, Russia. The population was 526 as of 2010. There are 15 streets.

== Geography ==
Bobrovsky 2-y is located on the Don River, 14 km south of Serafimovich (the district's administrative centre) by road. Zatonsky is the nearest rural locality.
