= Pervomaysky, Nekhayevsky District, Volgograd Oblast =

Pervomaysky Первомайский
- Settlement
- Location within Volgograd Oblast Location within Russia
- Coordinates: 50°26′N 41°31′E
- Country: Russia
- Region: Volgograd Oblast
- District: Nekhayevsky District
- Time zone: UTC+4:00

Pervomaysky (Russian: Первомайский) is a rural locality (a settlement) in Verkhnerechenskoye Rural Settlement, Nekhayevsky District, Volgograd Oblast, Russia. The population was 25 as of 2010.

== Geography ==
The village is located 10 km south-west of Verkhnerechensky.
