= Bugrovsky =

Bugrovsky Бугровский
- Khutor
- Location within Volgograd Oblast Location within Russia
- Coordinates: 51°01′N 41°48′E
- Country: Russia
- Region: Volgograd Oblast
- District: Uryupinsky District
- Time zone: UTC+4:00

Bugrovsky (Russian: Бугровский) is a rural locality (a khutor) in Saltynskoye Rural Settlement, Uryupinsky District, Volgograd Oblast, Russia. The population was 278 as of 2010. There are 9 streets.

== Geography ==
Bugrovsky is located in steppe, 36 km northwest of Uryupinsk (the district's administrative centre) by road. Saltynsky is the nearest rural locality.
