= Solodcha =

Solodcha Солодча
- Settlement
- Location within Volgograd Oblast Location within Russia
- Coordinates: 49°34′N 44°20′E
- Country: Russia
- Region: Volgograd Oblast
- District: Ilovlinsky District
- Time zone: UTC+4:00

Solodcha (Russian: Солодча) is a rural locality (a settlement) in Alexandrovskoye Rural Settlement, Ilovlinsky District, Volgograd Oblast, Russia. The population was 24 as of 2010. There are 12 streets.

== Geography ==
The village is located 2 km east from Alexandrovka.
