= Karagichev =

Karagichev Карагичев
- Khutor
- Location within Volgograd Oblast Location within Russia
- Coordinates: 49°22′N 42°33′E
- Country: Russia
- Region: Volgograd Oblast
- District: Serafimovichsky District
- Time zone: UTC+4:00

Karagichev (Russian: Карагичев) is a rural locality (a khutor) in Srednetsaritsynskoye Rural Settlement, Serafimovichsky District, Volgograd Oblast, Russia. The population was 7 as of 2010.

== Geography ==
Karagichev is located 36 km southwest of Serafimovich (the district's administrative centre) by road. Srednetsaritsynsky is the nearest rural locality.
