= Samokhino, Volgograd Oblast =

Samokhino Самохино
- Selo
- Location within Volgograd Oblast Location within Russia
- Coordinates: 47°49′N 43°45′E
- Country: Russia
- Region: Volgograd Oblast
- District: Oktyabrsky District
- Time zone: UTC+4:00

Samokhino (Russian: Самохино) is a rural locality (a selo) in Zhutovskoye Rural Settlement, Oktyabrsky District, Volgograd Oblast, Russia. The population was 219 as of 2010. There are 4 streets.

== Geography ==
Samokhino is located in steppe, on Yergeni, 30 km southeast of Oktyabrsky (the district's administrative centre) by road. Zhutovo 2-ye is the nearest rural locality.
