= Zheleznodorozhny razyezd 324 =

Zheleznodorozhny razyezd 324 Железнодорожный разъезд 324
- Passing loop
- Location within Volgograd Oblast Location within Russia
- Coordinates: 49°02′N 46°48′E
- Country: Russia
- Region: Volgograd Oblast
- District: Pallasovsky District
- Time zone: UTC+4:00

Zheleznodorozhny razyezd 324 (Russian: Железнодорожный разъезд 324) is a rural locality (a passing loop) in Eltonskoye Rural Settlement, Pallasovsky District, Volgograd Oblast, Russia. The population was 13 as of 2010.
