= Zayar =

Zayar Заяр
- Khutor
- Location within Volgograd Oblast Location within Russia
- Coordinates: 48°41′N 44°56′E
- Country: Russia
- Region: Volgograd Oblast
- District: Sredneakhtubinsky District
- Time zone: UTC+4:00

Zayar (Russian: Заяр) is a rural locality (a khutor) in Krasnoye Rural Settlement, Sredneakhtubinsky District, Volgograd Oblast, Russia. The population was 147 as of 2010. There are 19 streets.

== Geography ==
Zayar is located 9 km southeast of Srednyaya Akhtuba (the district's administrative centre) by road. Kalinina is the nearest rural locality.
