= Kupava =

Kupava Купава
- Selo
- Location within Volgograd Oblast Location within Russia
- Coordinates: 51°06′N 42°55′E
- Country: Russia
- Region: Volgograd Oblast
- District: Novonikolayevsky District
- Time zone: UTC+4:00

Kupava (Russian: Купава) is a rural locality (a selo) in Mirnoye Rural Settlement, Novonikolayevsky District, Volgograd Oblast, Russia. The population was 182 as of 2010. There are 5 streets.

== Geography ==
Kupava is located in steppe, on the Khopyorsko-Buzulukskaya Plain, on the bank of the Kupava River, 46 km northeast of Novonikolayevsky (the district's administrative centre) by road. Krasnoarmeysky is the nearest rural locality.
