= Varlamov, Serafimovichsky District, Volgograd Oblast =

Varlamov Варламов
- Khutor
- Location within Volgograd Oblast Location within Russia
- Coordinates: 49°13′N 42°12′E
- Country: Russia
- Region: Volgograd Oblast
- District: Serafimovichsky District
- Time zone: UTC+4:00

Varlamov (Russian: Варламов) is a rural locality (a khutor) in Proninskoye Rural Settlement, Serafimovichsky District, Volgograd Oblast, Russia. The population was 297 as of 2010. There are 11 streets.

== Geography ==
Varlamov is located 71 km southwest of Serafimovich (the district's administrative centre) by road. Pronin is the nearest rural locality.
