= Kazarino =

Kazarino Казарино
- Khutor
- Location within Volgograd Oblast Location within Russia
- Coordinates: 50°46′N 43°10′E
- Country: Russia
- Region: Volgograd Oblast
- District: Kikvidzensky District
- Time zone: UTC+4:00

Kazarino (Russian: Казарино) is a rural locality (a khutor) in Ozerkinskoye Rural Settlement, Kikvidzensky District, Volgograd Oblast, Russia. The population was 164 as of 2010.

== Geography ==
Kazarino is located in steppe, on Khopyorsko-Buzulukskaya plain, on the south bank of the Kazarina Lake, 10 km northeast of Preobrazhenskaya (the district's administrative centre) by road. Semyonovka is the nearest rural locality.
