= Osichki =

Osichki Осички
- Selo
- Location within Volgograd Oblast Location within Russia
- Coordinates: 50°57′N 44°30′E
- Country: Russia
- Region: Volgograd Oblast
- District: Rudnyansky District
- Time zone: UTC+4:00

Osichki (Russian: Осички) is a rural locality (a selo) and the administrative center of Osichkovskoye Rural Settlement, Rudnyansky District, Volgograd Oblast, Russia. The population was 555 as of 2010. There are 8 streets.

== Geography ==
Osichki is located in steppe, on the Khopyorsko-Buzulukskaya Plain, 19 km north of Rudnya (the district's administrative centre) by road. Tarapatino is the nearest rural locality.
