= Okladnensky =

Okladnensky Окладненский
- Khutor
- Location within Volgograd Oblast Location within Russia
- Coordinates: 50°44′N 42°14′E
- Country: Russia
- Region: Volgograd Oblast
- District: Uryupinsky District
- Time zone: UTC+4:00

Okladnensky (Russian: Окладненский) is a rural locality (a khutor) and the administrative center of Okladnenskoye Rural Settlement, Uryupinsky District, Volgograd Oblast, Russia. The population was 263 as of 2010. There are 5 streets.

== Geography ==
Okladnensky is located in steppe, 20 km southeast of Uryupinsk (the district's administrative centre) by road. Fedotovsky is the nearest rural locality.
