= Grachi, Gorodishchensky District, Volgograd Oblast =

Grachi Грачи
- Khutor
- Location within Volgograd Oblast Location within Russia
- Coordinates: 48°57′N 44°18′E
- Country: Russia
- Region: Volgograd Oblast
- District: Gorodishchensky District
- Time zone: UTC+4:00

Grachi (Russian: Грачи) is a rural locality (a khutor) and the administrative center of Grachyovskoye Rural Settlement, Gorodishchensky District, Volgograd Oblast, Russia. The population was 1,029 as of 2010. There are 23 streets.

== Geography ==
Grachi is located in steppe, on the Grachi River, 27 km northwest of Gorodishche (the district's administrative centre) by road. Samofalovka is the nearest rural locality.
