= Molokanovsky =

Molokanovsky Молокановский
- Khutor
- Location within Volgograd Oblast Location within Russia
- Coordinates: 48°11′N 43°08′E
- Country: Russia
- Region: Volgograd Oblast
- District: Oktyabrsky District
- Time zone: UTC+4:00

Molokanovsky (Russian: Молокановский) is a rural locality (a khutor) in Ilmenskoye Rural Settlement, Oktyabrsky District, Volgograd Oblast, Russia. The population was 113 as of 2010. There are 4 streets.

== Geography ==
Molokanovsky is located on Yergeni, 73 km northwest of Oktyabrsky (the district's administrative centre) by road. Ilmen-Suvorovsky is the nearest rural locality.
