= Sadkovsky =

Sadkovsky Садковский
- Khutor
- Location within Volgograd Oblast Location within Russia
- Coordinates: 50°57′N 41°54′E
- Country: Russia
- Region: Volgograd Oblast
- District: Uryupinsky District
- Time zone: UTC+4:00

Sadkovsky (Russian: Садковский) is a rural locality (a khutor) in Mikhaylovskoye Rural Settlement, Uryupinsky District, Volgograd Oblast, Russia. The population was 244 as of 2010.

== Geography ==
Sadkovsky is located in forest steppe, 24 km northwest of Uryupinsk (the district's administrative centre) by road. Mikhaylovskaya is the nearest rural locality.
