= Pervomaysky, Uryupinsky District, Volgograd Oblast =

Pervomaysky Первомайский
- Khutor
- Location within Volgograd Oblast Location within Russia
- Coordinates: 51°06′N 41°51′E
- Country: Russia
- Region: Volgograd Oblast
- District: Uryupinsky District
- Time zone: UTC+4:00

Pervomaysky (Russian: Первомайский) is a rural locality (a khutor) in Saltynskoye Rural Settlement, Uryupinsky District, Volgograd Oblast, Russia. The population was 711 as of 2010. There are 20 streets.

== Geography ==
Pervomaysky is located in forest steppe, 44 km northwest of Uryupinsk (the district's administrative centre) by road. Saltynsky is the nearest rural locality.
