= Tsaritsyn (settlement) =

Tsaritsyn Царицын
- Settlement
- Location within Volgograd Oblast Location within Russia
- Coordinates: 48°43′N 44°23′E
- Country: Russia
- Region: Volgograd Oblast
- District: Gorodishchensky District
- Time zone: UTC+4:00

Tsaritsyn (Russian: Царицын) is a rural locality (a settlement) and the administrative center of Tsaritsynskoye Rural Settlement, Gorodishchensky District, Volgograd Oblast, Russia. The population was 1,059 as of 2010. There are 85 streets.

== Geography ==
Tsaritsyn is located 16 km southwest of Gorodishche (the district's administrative centre) by road. Studyono-Yablonovka is the nearest rural locality.
