= Konny =

Konny Конный
- Passing loop
- Location within Volgograd Oblast Location within Russia
- Coordinates: 48°51′N 44°20′E
- Country: Russia
- Region: Volgograd Oblast
- District: Gorodishchensky District
- Time zone: UTC+4:00

Konny (Russian: Конный) is a rural locality (a passing loop) in Samofalovskoye Rural Settlement, Gorodishchensky District, Volgograd Oblast, Russia. The population was 16 as of 2010.

== Geography ==
The village is located in steppe, 6 km north-west from Gorodishche.
