= Bolshiye Chapurniki =

Bolshiye Chapurniki Большие Чапурники
- Selo
- Location within Volgograd Oblast Location within Russia
- Coordinates: 48°25′N 44°34′E
- Country: Russia
- Region: Volgograd Oblast
- District: Svetloyarsky District
- Time zone: UTC+4:00

Bolshiye Chapurniki (Russian: Большие Чапурники) is a rural locality (a selo) in Svetloyarsky District, Volgograd Oblast, Russia. The population was 3,228 as of 2010. There are 13 streets.

== Geography ==
Bolshiye Chapurniki is located 19 km southwest of Svetly Yar (the district's administrative centre) by road. Malye Chapurniki is the nearest rural locality.
