= Ternovoy, Kletsky District, Volgograd Oblast =

Ternovoy Терновой
- Khutor
- Location within Volgograd Oblast Location within Russia
- Coordinates: 48°59′N 42°55′E
- Country: Russia
- Region: Volgograd Oblast
- District: Kletsky District
- Time zone: UTC+4:00

Ternovoy (Russian: Терновой) is a rural locality (a khutor) in Manoylinskoye Rural Settlement, Kletsky District, Volgograd Oblast, Russia. The population was 115 as of 2010.

== Geography ==
Ternovoy is located 48 km south of Kletskaya (the district's administrative centre) by road. Manoylin is the nearest rural locality.
