= Kapkinka =

Kapkinka Капкинка
- Selo
- Location within Volgograd Oblast Location within Russia
- Coordinates: 48°08′N 43°50′E
- Country: Russia
- Region: Volgograd Oblast
- District: Oktyabrsky District
- Time zone: UTC+4:00

Kapkinka (Russian: Капкинка) is a rural locality (a selo) in Vasilyevskoye Rural Settlement, Oktyabrsky District, Volgograd Oblast, Russia. The population was 99 as of 2010. There are 4 streets.

== Geography ==
Kapkinka is located on Yergeni, on the Myshkova River, 33 km northeast of Oktyabrsky (the district's administrative centre) by road. Vasilyevka is the nearest rural locality.
