= Krivovsky =

Krivovsky Кривовский
- Khutor
- Location within Volgograd Oblast Location within Russia
- Coordinates: 50°42′N 41°51′E
- Country: Russia
- Region: Volgograd Oblast
- District: Uryupinsky District
- Time zone: UTC+4:00

Krivovsky (Russian: Кривовский) is a rural locality (a khutor) in Dobrinskoye Rural Settlement, Uryupinsky District, Volgograd Oblast, Russia. The population was 4 as of 2010. There are 3 streets.

== Geography ==
Krivovsky is located in the valley of the Khopyor River, 25 km southwest of Uryupinsk (the district's administrative centre) by road. Sazonovsky is the nearest rural locality.
