= Karabidayevka =

Karabidayevka Карабидаевка
- Khutor
- Location within Volgograd Oblast Location within Russia
- Coordinates: 49°02′N 46°55′E
- Country: Russia
- Region: Volgograd Oblast
- District: Pallasovsky District
- Time zone: UTC+4:00

Karabidayevka (Russian: Карабидаевка) is a rural locality (a khutor) in Eltonskoye Rural Settlement, Pallasovsky District, Volgograd Oblast, Russia. The population was 93 as of 2010. There are 3 streets.

== Geography ==
Karabidayevka is located 11 km south-east from Elton, 124 km south of Pallasovka (the district's administrative centre) by road. Elton is the nearest rural locality.
