= Kumovka =

Kumovka Кумовка
- Khutor
- Location within Volgograd Oblast Location within Russia
- Coordinates: 48°37′N 43°30′E
- Country: Russia
- Region: Volgograd Oblast
- District: Kalachyovsky District
- Time zone: UTC+4:00

Kumovka (Russian: Кумовка) is a rural locality (a khutor) in Pyatiizbyanskoye Rural Settlement, Kalachyovsky District, Volgograd Oblast, Russia. The population was 222 as of 2010. There are 3 streets.

== Geography ==
Kumovka is located 20 km southwest of Kalach-na-Donu (the district's administrative centre) by road. Dom otdykha is the nearest rural locality.
