= Kamyshi, Volgograd Oblast =

Kamyshi Камыши
- Khutor
- Location within Volgograd Oblast Location within Russia
- Coordinates: 48°44′N 43°30′E
- Country: Russia
- Region: Volgograd Oblast
- District: Kalachyovsky District
- Time zone: UTC+4:00

Kamyshi (Russian: Камыши) is a rural locality (a khutor) in Ilyevskoye Rural Settlement, Kalachyovsky District, Volgograd Oblast, Russia. The population was 397 as of 2010. There are 23 streets.

== Geography ==
Kamyshi is located in steppe, on Yergeny, 10 km northwest of Kalach-na-Donu (the district's administrative centre) by road. Kalach-na-Donu is the nearest rural locality.
