= Belogorsky (rural locality) =

Belogorsky (Russian: Белого́рский; masculine), Belogorskaya (Белого́рская; feminine), or Belogorskoye (Белого́рское; neuter) is the name of several rural localities in Russia:

- Belogorsky, Arkhangelsk Oblast, a settlement in Belogorsky Selsoviet of Kholmogorsky District of Arkhangelsk Oblast
- Belogorsky (khutor), Bishkainsky Selsoviet, Aurgazinsky District, Republic of Bashkortostan, a khutor in Bishkainsky Selsoviet of Aurgazinsky District of the Republic of Bashkortostan
- Belogorsky (village), Bishkainsky Selsoviet, Aurgazinsky District, Republic of Bashkortostan, a village in Bishkainsky Selsoviet of Aurgazinsky District of the Republic of Bashkortostan
- Belogorsky, Orenburg Oblast, a settlement in Belogorsky Selsoviet of Belyayevsky District of Orenburg Oblast
- Belogorsky, Rostov Oblast, a khutor in Bazkovskoye Rural Settlement of Sholokhovsky District of Rostov Oblast
- Belogorsky, Kumylzhensky District, Volgograd Oblast, a khutor in Belogorsky Selsoviet of Kumylzhensky District of Volgograd Oblast
- Belogorsky, Uryupinsky District, Volgograd Oblast, a khutor in Rossoshinsky Selsoviet of Uryupinsky District of Volgograd Oblast
- Belogorskoye, Republic of Mordovia, a selo in Atemarsky Selsoviet of Lyambirsky District of the Republic of Mordovia
- Belogorskoye, Saratov Oblast, a selo in Krasnoarmeysky District of Saratov Oblast
- Belogorskoye, Ulyanovsk Oblast, a selo in Belogorsky Rural Okrug of Terengulsky District of Ulyanovsk Oblast
