= Tereshkovka =

Tereshkovka Терешковка
- Village
- Location within Bashkortostan Location within Russia
- Coordinates: 54°02′N 55°37′E
- Country: Russia
- Region: Bashkortostan
- District: Aurgazinsky District
- Time zone: UTC+5:00

Tereshkovka (Russian: Терешковка) is a rural locality (a village) in Stepanovsky Selsoviet, Aurgazinsky District, Bashkortostan, Russia. The population was 17 as of 2010. There is one street.

== Geography ==
Tereshkovka is located 21 kilometres (13 mi) northwest of Tolbazy (the district's administrative centre) by road. Usmanovo is the nearest rural locality.
