= Trudovka =

Trudovka Трудовка
- Village
- Location within Bashkortostan Location within Russia
- Coordinates: 53°56′N 55°59′E
- Country: Russia
- Region: Bashkortostan
- District: Aurgazinsky District
- Time zone: UTC+5:00

Trudovka (Russian: Трудовка) is a rural locality (a village) in Kebyachevsky Selsoviet, Aurgazinsky District, Bashkortostan, Russia. The population was 22 in 2010. It has one street and is 14 km southeast of Tolbazy (the district's administrative centre) by road. Utarkul is the nearest rural locality.
