= Igenche, Aurgazinsky District, Republic of Bashkortostan =

Igenche Игенче
- Village
- Location within Bashkortostan Location within Russia
- Coordinates: 53°58′N 55°36′E
- Country: Russia
- Region: Bashkortostan
- District: Aurgazinsky District
- Time zone: UTC+5:00

Igenche (Russian: Игенче; Bashkir: Игенсе, İgense) is a rural locality (a village) in Turumbetovsky Selsoviet, Aurgazinsky District, Bashkortostan, Russia. The population was 6 as of 2010. There is 1 street.

== Geography ==
Igenche is located 25 km west of Tolbazy (the district's administrative centre) by road. Dobrovolnoye is the nearest rural locality.
