= Muksino =

Muksino Муксино
- Village
- Location within Bashkortostan Location within Russia
- Coordinates: 54°15′N 55°54′E
- Country: Russia
- Region: Bashkortostan
- District: Aurgazinsky District

Population (2010)
  - Total: 37
- Time zone: UTC+5:00

Muksino (Russian: Муксино; Bashkir: Мөҡсин, Möqsin; Tatar: Мөхсин, Möxsin) is a rural locality (a village) in Ishlinsky Selsoviet, Aurgazinsky District, Bashkortostan, Russia. The population was 37 as of 2010.

== Geography ==
Muksino is located 31 km north of Tolbazy (the district's administrative centre) by road. Starokuzyakovo is the nearest rural locality.
