= Podsosensky =

Podsosensky Подсосенский
- Khutor
- Location within Volgograd Oblast Location within Russia
- Coordinates: 50°38′N 41°41′E
- Country: Russia
- Region: Volgograd Oblast
- District: Uryupinsky District
- Time zone: UTC+4:00

Podsosensky (Russian: Подсосенский) is a rural locality (a khutor) in Rossoshinskoye Rural Settlement, Uryupinsky District, Volgograd Oblast, Russia. The population was 50 as of 2010. There are 2 streets.

== Geography ==
Podsosensky is located in steppe, 41 km southwest of Uryupinsk (the district's administrative centre) by road. Makarovsky is the nearest rural locality.
