= Zakhopyorsky, Uryupinsky District, Volgograd Oblast =

Zakhopyorsky Захопёрский
- Khutor
- Location within Volgograd Oblast Location within Russia
- Coordinates: 50°46′N 41°53′E
- Country: Russia
- Region: Volgograd Oblast
- District: Uryupinsky District
- Time zone: UTC+4:00

Zakhopyorsky (Russian: Захопёрский) is a rural locality (a khutor) in Dobrinskoye Rural Settlement, Uryupinsky District, Volgograd Oblast, Russia. The population was 1 as of 2010.

== Geography ==
Zakhopyorsky is located in the valley of the Khopyor River, 14 km southwest of Uryupinsk (the district's administrative centre) by road. Gorsky is the nearest rural locality.
