= Nizhny Begenyash =

Nizhny Begenyash Нижний Бегеняш
- Village
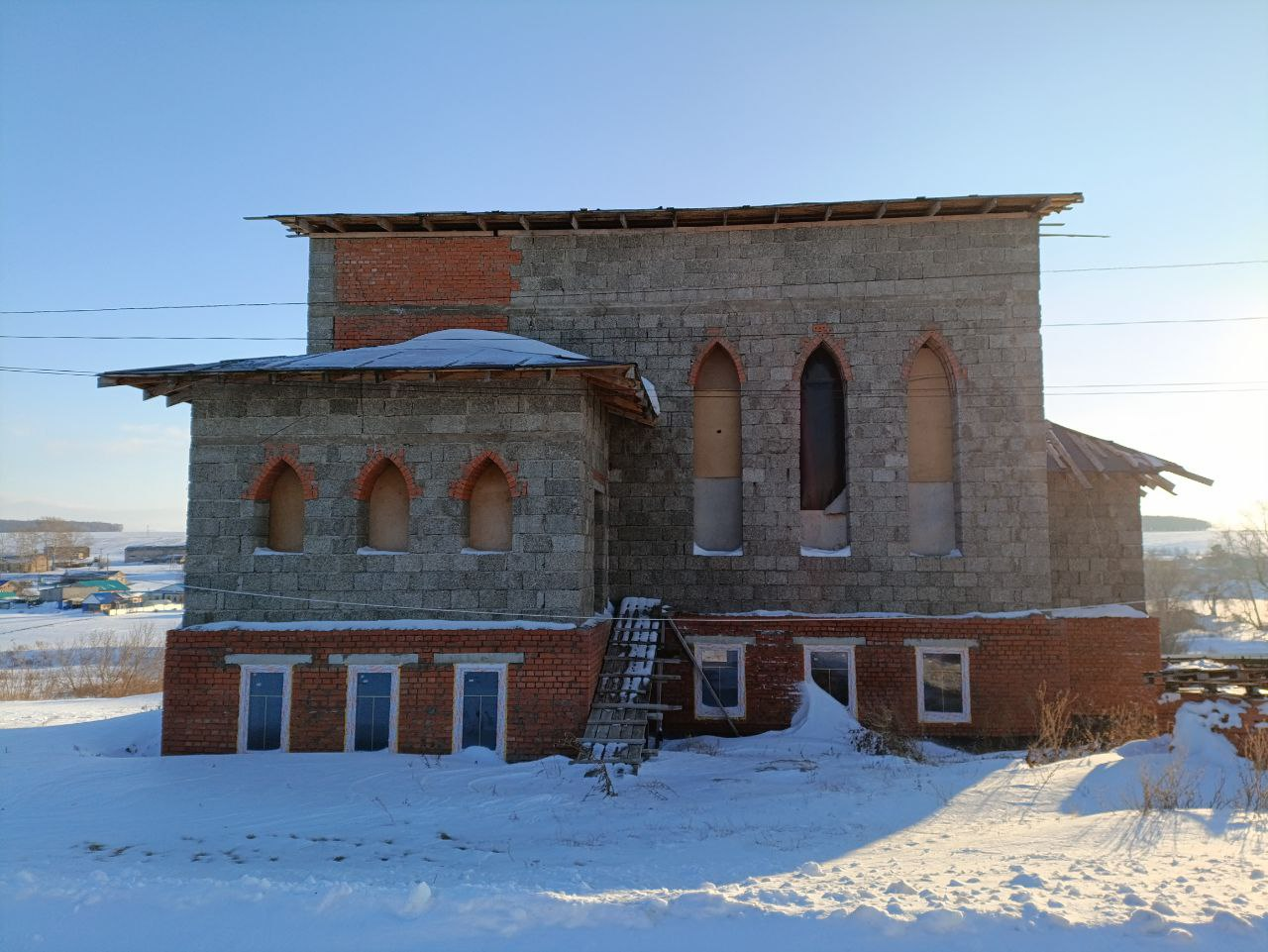
- Mosque in the village of Nizhny Begenyash

- Location within Bashkortostan Location within Russia
- Coordinates: 53°47′N 55°33′E
- Country: Russia
- Region: Bashkortostan
- District: Aurgazinsky District
- Time zone: UTC+5:00

Nizhny Begenyash (Russian: Нижний Бегеняш; Bashkir: Түбәнге Бәгәнәш, Tübänge Bägänäş) is a rural locality (a village) in Semyonkinsky Selsoviet, Aurgazinsky District, Bashkortostan, Russia. The population was 235 as of 2010. There are 2 streets.

== Geography ==
Nizhny Begenyash is located 37 km southwest of Tolbazy (the district's administrative centre) by road. Kuzminovka is the nearest rural locality.
