= Malaya Ivanovka =

Malaya Ivanovka Малая Ивановка
- Village
- Location within Bashkortostan Location within Russia
- Coordinates: 54°08′N 56°17′E
- Country: Russia
- Region: Bashkortostan
- District: Aurgazinsky District
- Time zone: UTC+5:00

Malaya Ivanovka (Russian: Малая Ивановка) is a rural locality (a village) in Nagadaksky Selsoviet, Aurgazinsky District, Bashkortostan, Russia. The population was 12 as of 2010. There is 1 street.

== Geography ==
Malaya Ivanovka is located 45 km northeast of Tolbazy (the district's administrative centre) by road. Nizhniye Lekandy is the nearest rural locality.
