= Sabanchi =

Sabanchi Сабанчи
- Village
- Location within Bashkortostan Location within Russia
- Coordinates: 54°03′N 56°02′E
- Country: Russia
- Region: Bashkortostan
- District: Aurgazinsky District
- Time zone: UTC+5:00

Sabanchi (Russian: Сабанчи; Bashkir: Һабансы, Habansı) is a rural locality (a village) in Batyrovsky Selsoviet, Aurgazinsky District, Bashkortostan, Russia. The population was 8 as of 2010. There is 1 street.

== Geography ==
Sabanchi is located 15 km east of Tolbazy (the district's administrative centre) by road. Mustafino is the nearest rural locality.
