= Subkhangulovo =

Subkhangulovo Субхангулово
- Village
- Location within Bashkortostan Location within Russia
- Coordinates: 54°13′N 55°35′E
- Country: Russia
- Region: Bashkortostan
- District: Aurgazinsky District
- Time zone: UTC+5:00

Subkhangulovo (Russian: Субхангулово; Bashkir: Собханғол, Sobxanğol) is a rural locality (a village) in Urshaksky Selsoviet, Aurgazinsky District, Bashkortostan, Russia. The population was 93 as of 2010. There are 2 streets.

== Geography ==
Subkhangulovo is located 39 km northwest of Tolbazy (the district's administrative centre) by road. Nadezhdino is the nearest rural locality.
