= Sazonovsky =

Sazonovsky Сазоновский
- Khutor
- Location within Volgograd Oblast Location within Russia
- Coordinates: 50°41′N 41°50′E
- Country: Russia
- Region: Volgograd Oblast
- District: Uryupinsky District
- Time zone: UTC+4:00

Sazonovsky (Russian: Сазоновский) is a rural locality (a khutor) in Rossoshinskoye Rural Settlement, Uryupinsky District, Volgograd Oblast, Russia. The population was 50 as of 2010. There are 2 streets.

== Geography ==
Sazonovsky is located 34 km southwest of Uryupinsk (the district's administrative centre) by road. Safonovsky is the nearest rural locality.
