= Astakhovsky =

Astakhovsky Астаховский
- Khutor
- Location within Volgograd Oblast Location within Russia
- Coordinates: 50°55′N 41°35′E
- Country: Russia
- Region: Volgograd Oblast
- District: Uryupinsky District
- Time zone: UTC+4:00

Astakhovsky (Russian: Астаховский) is a rural locality (a khutor) in Bespalovskoye Rural Settlement, Uryupinsky District, Volgograd Oblast, Russia. The population was 78 as of 2010.

== Geography ==
Astakhovsky is located in northwest of Volgograd Oblast, 44 km northwest of Uryupinsk (the district's administrative centre) by road. Vikhlyantsevsky is the nearest rural locality.
