= Maryanovka, Republic of Bashkortostan =

Maryanovka Марьяновка
- Village
- Location within Bashkortostan Location within Russia
- Coordinates: 54°00′N 55°41′E
- Country: Russia
- Region: Bashkortostan
- District: Aurgazinsky District

Population (2010)
  - Total: 227
- Time zone: UTC+5:00

Maryanovka (Russian: Марьяновка) is a rural locality (a village) in Stepanovsky Selsoviet, Aurgazinsky District, Bashkortostan, Russia. The population was 227 as of 2010. There are 3 streets.

== Geography ==
Maryanovka is located 16 km west of Tolbazy (the district's administrative centre) by road. Stepanovka is the nearest rural locality.
