= Verkhneantoshinsky =

Verkhneantoshinsky Верхнеантошинский
- Khutor
- Location within Volgograd Oblast Location within Russia
- Coordinates: 50°46′N 41°36′E
- Country: Russia
- Region: Volgograd Oblast
- District: Uryupinsky District
- Time zone: UTC+4:00

Verkhneantoshinsky (Russian: Верхнеантошинский) is a rural locality (a khutor) in Verkhnebezymyanovskoye Rural Settlement, Uryupinsky District, Volgograd Oblast, Russia. The population was 44 as of 2010. There are 5 streets.

== Geography ==
Verkhneantoshinsky is located 39 km of Uryupinsk (the district's administrative centre) by road. Verkhnebezymyansky is the nearest rural locality.
