= Sheverli =

Sheverli Шеверли
- Village
- Location within Bashkortostan Location within Russia
- Coordinates: 53°53′N 55°41′E
- Country: Russia
- Region: Bashkortostan
- District: Aurgazinsky District
- Time zone: UTC+5:00

Sheverli (Russian: Шеверли; Bashkir: Шеверле, Şewerle; Chuvash: Шĕвĕрлĕ, Şĕvĕrlĕ) is a rural locality (a village) in Semyonkinsky Selsoviet, Aurgazinsky District, Bashkortostan, Russia. The population was 360 as of 2010. There are 7 streets.

== Geography ==
Sheverli is located 33 km southwest of Tolbazy (the district's administrative centre) by road. Shlandy is the nearest rural locality.
