= Bubnovsky =

Bubnovsky Бубновский
- Khutor
- Location within Volgograd Oblast Location within Russia
- Coordinates: 50°58′N 41°49′E
- Country: Russia
- Region: Volgograd Oblast
- District: Uryupinsky District
- Time zone: UTC+4:00

Bubnovsky (Russian: Бубновский) is a rural locality (a khutor) and the administrative center of Bubnovskoye Rural Settlement, Uryupinsky District, Volgograd Oblast, Russia. The population was 1,029 as of 2010. There are 18 streets.

== Geography ==
Bubnovsky is located in forest steppe, 30 km northwest of Uryupinsk (the district's administrative centre) by road. Mikhaylovskaya is the nearest rural locality.
