= Cherkassky, Volgograd Oblast =

Cherkassky Черкасский
- Khutor
- Location within Volgograd Oblast Location within Russia
- Coordinates: 51°00′N 41°46′E
- Country: Russia
- Region: Volgograd Oblast
- District: Uryupinsky District
- Time zone: UTC+4:00

Cherkassky (Russian: Черкасский) is a rural locality (a khutor) in Bubnovskoye Rural Settlement, Uryupinsky District, Volgograd Oblast, Russia. The population was 27 as of 2010. There is 1 street.

== Geography ==
Cherkassky is located in forest steppe, 37 km northwest of Uryupinsk (the district's administrative centre) by road. Bugrovsky is the nearest rural locality.
