= Asavbashevo =

Asavbashevo Асавбашево
- Village
- Location within Bashkortostan Location within Russia
- Coordinates: 53°50′N 55°41′E
- Country: Russia
- Region: Bashkortostan
- District: Aurgazinsky District
- Time zone: UTC+5:00

Asavbashevo (Russian: Асавбашево; Bashkir: Аҫаубаш, Aśawbaş; Chuvash: Асавпуç, Asavpuś) is a rural locality (a village) in Semyonkinsky Selsoviet, Aurgazinsky District, Bashkortostan, Russia. The population was 414 as of 2010. There are 4 streets.

== Geography ==
Asavbashevo is located 26 km southwest of Tolbazy (the district's administrative centre) by road. Semyonkino is the nearest rural locality.
