= Staroabsalyamovo =

Staroabsalyamovo Староабсалямово
- Selo
- Location within Bashkortostan Location within Russia
- Coordinates: 54°07′N 55°39′E
- Country: Russia
- Region: Bashkortostan
- District: Aurgazinsky District
- Time zone: UTC+5:00

Staroabsalyamovo (Russian: Староабсалямово; Bashkir: Иҫке Әпсәләм, İśke Äpsäläm) is a rural locality (a selo) and the administrative centre of Urshaksky Selsoviet, Aurgazinsky District, Bashkortostan, Russia. The population was 433 as of 2010. There are 8 streets.

== Geography ==
Staroabsalyamovo is located 23 km northwest of Tolbazy (the district's administrative centre) by road. Kurmanayevo is the nearest rural locality.
