= Tepikinskaya =

Tepikinskaya Тепикинская
- Stanitsa
- Location within Volgograd Oblast Location within Russia
- Coordinates: 50°39′N 41°54′E
- Country: Russia
- Region: Volgograd Oblast
- District: Uryupinsky District
- Time zone: UTC+4:00

Tepikinskaya (Russian: Тепикинская) is a rural locality (a stanitsa) in Akchernskoye Rural Settlement, Uryupinsky District, Volgograd Oblast, Russia. The population was 403 as of 2010. There are 10 streets.

== Geography ==
Tepikinskaya is located on the left bank of the Khopyor River, 26 km southwest of Uryupinsk (the district's administrative centre) by road. Belogorsky is the nearest rural locality.
