= Tryapino =

Tryapino Тряпино
- Selo
- Location within Bashkortostan Location within Russia
- Coordinates: 54°05′N 56°10′E
- Country: Russia
- Region: Bashkortostan
- District: Aurgazinsky District
- Time zone: UTC+5:00

Tryapino (Russian: Тряпино; Bashkir: Терәпә, Teräpä) is a rural locality (a selo) and the administrative centre of Tryapinsky Selsoviet, Aurgazinsky District, Bashkortostan, Russia. The population was 452 as of 2010. There are 7 streets.

== Geography ==
Tryapino is located 24 km northeast of Tolbazy (the district's administrative centre) by road. Novogurovka is the nearest rural locality.
