= Novy Kalchir =

Novy Kalchir Новый Кальчир
- Village
- Location within Bashkortostan Location within Russia
- Coordinates: 54°04′N 55°53′E
- Country: Russia
- Region: Bashkortostan
- District: Aurgazinsky District
- Time zone: UTC+5:00

Novy Kalchir (Russian: Новый Кальчир; Bashkir: Яңы Кәлсер, Yañı Kälser) is a rural locality (a village) and the administrative centre of Novokalchirovsky Selsoviet, Aurgazinsky District, Bashkortostan, Russia. The population was 187 as of 2010. There are 2 streets.

== Geography ==
Novy Kalchir is located 8 km north of Tolbazy (the district's administrative centre) by road. Kalchirburan is the nearest rural locality.
