= Kalchirburan =

Kalchirburan Кальчирбуран
- Village
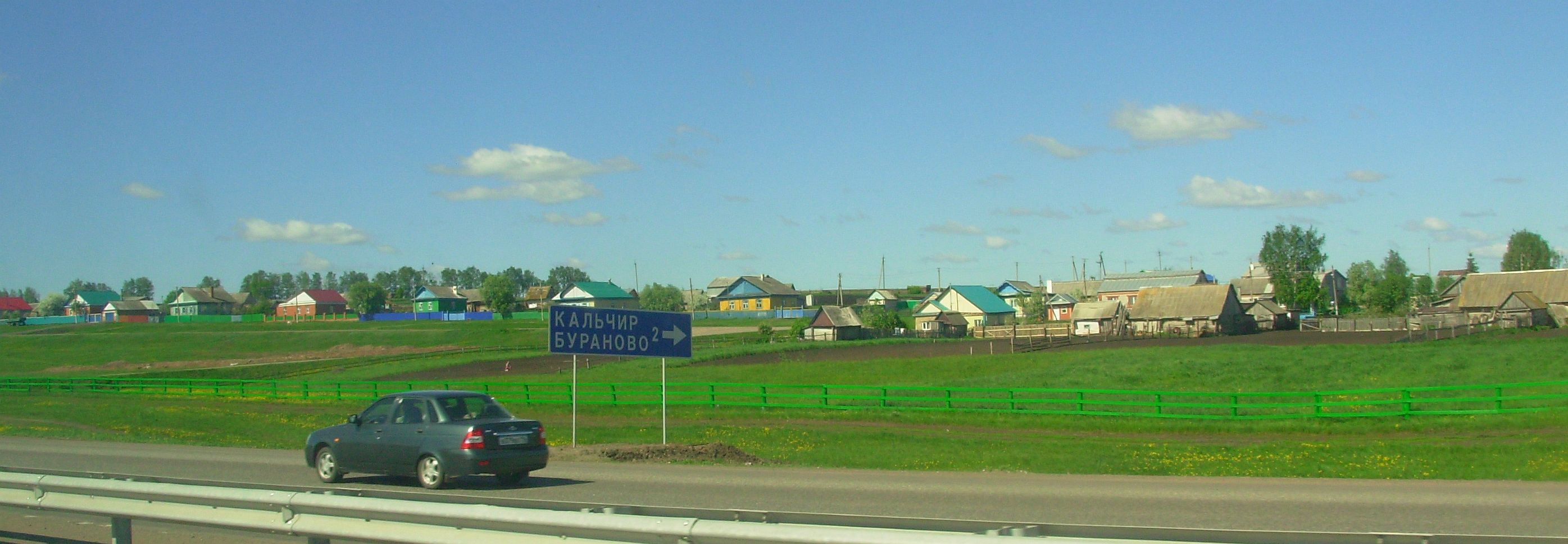

- Location within Bashkortostan Location within Russia
- Coordinates: 54°04′N 55°51′E
- Country: Russia
- Region: Bashkortostan
- District: Aurgazinsky District
- Time zone: UTC+5:00

Kalchirburan (Russian: Кальчирбуран; Bashkir: Кәлсер-Буран, Kälser-Buran) is a rural locality (a village) in Novokalchirovsky Selsoviet, Aurgazinsky District, Bashkortostan, Russia. The population was 318 as of 2010. There are 3 streets.

== Geography ==
Kalchirburan is located 10 km north of Tolbazy (the district's administrative centre) by road. Novy Kalchir is the nearest rural locality.
