= Belogorsky =

Belogorsky may refer to:

- Belogorsky, Arkhangelsk Oblast, a settlement in Belogorsky Selsoviet of Kholmogorsky District of Arkhangelsk Oblast, Russia
- Belogorsky District, a district of Amur Oblast, Russia
- Belogorsky Convent, a friary in Perm Krai, Russia

== See also ==
- Belogorsky (rural locality), a list of rural localities in Russia
