= Nizhnesoinsky =

Nizhnesoinsky Нижнесоинский
- Khutor
- Location within Volgograd Oblast Location within Russia
- Coordinates: 50°41′N 41°46′E
- Country: Russia
- Region: Volgograd Oblast
- District: Uryupinsky District
- Time zone: UTC+4:00

Nizhnesoinsky (Russian: Нижнесоинский) is a rural locality (a khutor) in Rossoshinskoye Rural Settlement, Uryupinsky District, Volgograd Oblast, Russia. The population was 31 as of 2010.

== Geography ==
Nizhnesoinsky is located 32 km southwest of Uryupinsk (the district's administrative centre) by road. Rossoshinsky is the nearest rural locality.
