= Starokuzyakovo =

Starokuzyakovo Старокузяково
- Village
- Location within Bashkortostan Location within Russia
- Coordinates: 54°15′N 55°55′E
- Country: Russia
- Region: Bashkortostan
- District: Aurgazinsky District

Population (2010)
  - Total: 362
- Time zone: UTC+5:00

Starokuzyakovo (Russian: Старокузяково; Bashkir: Иҫке Күзәк, İśke Küzäk) is a rural locality (a village) in Ishlinsky Selsoviet, Aurgazinsky District, Bashkortostan, Russia. The population was 362 as of 2010. There are 10 streets.

== Geography ==
Starokuzyakovo is located 30 km north of Tolbazy (the district's administrative centre) by road. Alexandrovka is the nearest rural locality.
