= Daryevka =

Daryevka Дарьевка
- Village
- Location within Bashkortostan Location within Russia
- Coordinates: 54°13′N 56°02′E
- Country: Russia
- Region: Bashkortostan
- District: Aurgazinsky District
- Time zone: UTC+5:00

Daryevka (Russian: Дарьевка) is a rural locality (a village) in Ismagilovsky Selsoviet, Aurgazinsky District, Bashkortostan, Russia. The population was 4 as of 2010. There is 1 street.

== Geography ==
Daryevka is located 32 km northeast of Tolbazy (the district's administrative centre) by road. Nikolskoye is the nearest rural locality.
