= Kurmanayevo =

Kurmanayevo Курманаево
- Village
- Location within Bashkortostan Location within Russia
- Coordinates: 54°08′N 55°38′E
- Country: Russia
- Region: Bashkortostan
- District: Aurgazinsky District
- Time zone: UTC+5:00

Kurmanayevo (Russian: Курмана́ево; Bashkir: Ҡорманай, Qormanay) is a rural locality (a village) in Urshaksky Selsoviet, Aurgazinsky District, Bashkortostan, Russia. The population was 306 as of 2010. There are 15 streets.

== Geography ==
Kurmanayevo is located 26 km northwest of Tolbazy (the district's administrative centre) by road. Staroabsalyamovo is the nearest rural locality.
