= Firsovsky =

Firsovsky Фирсовский
- Khutor
- Location within Volgograd Oblast Location within Russia
- Coordinates: 51°00′N 41°55′E
- Country: Russia
- Region: Volgograd Oblast
- District: Uryupinsky District
- Time zone: UTC+4:00

Firsovsky (Russian: Фирсовский) is a rural locality (a khutor) in Saltynskoye Rural Settlement, Uryupinsky District, Volgograd Oblast, Russia. The population was 187 as of 2010. There are 7 streets.

== Geography ==
Firsovsky is located in steppe, on the left bank of the Saltynka River, 30 km north of Uryupinsk (the district's administrative centre) by road. Saltynsky is the nearest rural locality.
