= Tatarsky Nagadak =

Tatarsky Nagadak Татарский Нагадак
- Village
- Location within Bashkortostan Location within Russia
- Coordinates: 54°05′N 56°17′E
- Country: Russia
- Region: Bashkortostan
- District: Aurgazinsky District
- Time zone: UTC+5:00

Tatarsky Nagadak (Russian: Татарский Нагадак; Bashkir: Татар Нуғаҙағы, Tatar Nuğaźağı; Tatar: Татар Нугазагы, Tatar Nuğazağı) is a rural locality (a village) and the administrative centre of Nagadaksky Selsoviet, Aurgazinsky District, Bashkortostan, Russia. The population was 451 as of 2010. There are 7 streets.

== Geography ==
Tatarsky Nagadak is located 39 km northeast of Tolbazy (the district's administrative centre) by road. Nagadak is the nearest rural locality.
