= Utarkul =

Utarkul Утаркуль
- Village
- Location within Bashkortostan Location within Russia
- Coordinates: 53°56′N 55°57′E
- Country: Russia
- Region: Bashkortostan
- District: Aurgazinsky District
- Time zone: UTC+5:00

Utarkul (Russian: Утаркуль; Bashkir: Утаркүл, Utarkül) is a rural locality (a village) in Kebyachevsky Selsoviet, Aurgazinsky District, Bashkortostan, Russia. The population was 68 as of 2010. There is 1 street.

== Geography ==
Utarkul is located 13 km southeast of Tolbazy (the district's administrative centre) by road. Tashlykul is the nearest rural locality.
