= Santyrsky =

Santyrsky Сантырский
- Khutor
- Location within Volgograd Oblast Location within Russia
- Coordinates: 50°57′N 42°01′E
- Country: Russia
- Region: Volgograd Oblast
- District: Uryupinsky District
- Time zone: UTC+4:00

Santyrsky (Russian: Сантырский) is a rural locality (a khutor) in Mikhaylovskoye Rural Settlement, Uryupinsky District, Volgograd Oblast, Russia. The population was 84 as of 2010.

== Geography ==
Santyrsky is located in forest steppe, 24 km north of Uryupinsk (the district's administrative centre) by road. Skabelinsky is the nearest rural locality.
