= Zaburdyayevsky =

Zaburdyayevsky Забурдяевский
- Khutor
- Location within Volgograd Oblast Location within Russia
- Coordinates: 50°51′N 41°46′E
- Country: Russia
- Region: Volgograd Oblast
- District: Uryupinsky District
- Time zone: UTC+4:00

Zaburdyayevsky (Russian: Забурдяевский) is a rural locality (a khutor) in Dobrinskoye Rural Settlement, Uryupinsky District, Volgograd Oblast, Russia. The population was 200 as of 2010. There are 6 streets.

== Geography ==
Zaburdyayevsky is located in step, 26 km northwest of Uryupinsk (the district's administrative centre) by road. Kudryashyovsky is the nearest rural locality.
