= Khasanovo =

Khasanovo Хасаново
- Village
- Location within Bashkortostan Location within Russia
- Coordinates: 54°13′N 55°38′E
- Country: Russia
- Region: Bashkortostan
- District: Aurgazinsky District
- Time zone: UTC+5:00

Khasanovo (Russian: Хасаново; Bashkir: Хәсән, Xäsän) is a rural locality (a village) in Urshaksky Selsoviet, Aurgazinsky District, Bashkortostan, Russia. The population was 13 as of 2010. There is 1 street.

== Geography ==
Khasanovo is located 44 km northwest of Tolbazy (the district's administrative centre) by road. Chulpan is the nearest rural locality.
