= Kushkul, Aurgazinsky District, Republic of Bashkortostan =

Kushkul Кушкуль
- Village
- Location within Bashkortostan Location within Russia
- Coordinates: 53°55′N 55°41′E
- Country: Russia
- Region: Bashkortostan
- District: Aurgazinsky District
- Time zone: UTC+5:00

Kushkul (Russian: Кушкуль; Bashkir: Ҡушкүл, Quşkül) is a rural locality (a village) in Mikhaylovsky Selsoviet, Aurgazinsky District, Bashkortostan, Russia. The population was 58 as of 2010. There is 1 street.

== Geography ==
Kushkul is located 18 km southwest of Tolbazy (the district's administrative centre) by road. Tashtamak is the nearest rural locality.
