= Suleymanovo =

Suleymanovo Сулейманово
- Village
- Location within Bashkortostan Location within Russia
- Coordinates: 54°06′N 56°12′E
- Country: Russia
- Region: Bashkortostan
- District: Aurgazinsky District
- Time zone: UTC+5:00

Suleymanovo (Russian: Сулейманово; Bashkir: Сөләймән, Söläymän) is a rural locality (a village) in Nagadaksky Selsoviet, Aurgazinsky District, Bashkortostan, Russia. The population was 34 as of 2010. There is 1 street.

== Geography ==
Suleymanovo is located 43 km northeast of Tolbazy (the district's administrative centre) by road. Novogurovka is the nearest rural locality.
