= Bulekovsky =

Bulekovsky Булековский
- Khutor
- Location within Volgograd Oblast Location within Russia
- Coordinates: 50°39′N 41°48′E
- Country: Russia
- Region: Volgograd Oblast
- District: Uryupinsky District
- Time zone: UTC+4:00

Bulekovsky (Russian: Булековский) is a rural locality (a khutor) in Rossoshinskoye Rural Settlement, Uryupinsky District, Volgograd Oblast, Russia. The population was 101 as of 2010.

== Geography ==
Bulekovsky is located in steppe, 35 km southwest of Uryupinsk (the district's administrative centre) by road. Podgorinsky is the nearest rural locality.
