= Yuldashevo, Aurgazinsky District, Republic of Bashkortostan =

Yuldashevo Юлдашево
- Village
- Location within Bashkortostan Location within Russia
- Coordinates: 53°54′N 55°39′E
- Country: Russia
- Region: Bashkortostan
- District: Aurgazinsky District
- Time zone: UTC+5:00

Yuldashevo (Russian: Юлдашево; Bashkir: Юлдаш, Yuldaş) is a rural locality (a village) in Semyonkinsky Selsoviet, Aurgazinsky District, Bashkortostan, Russia. The population was 60 as of 2010. There is 1 street.

== Geography ==
Yuldashevo is located 22 km southwest of Tolbazy (the district's administrative centre) by road. Sheverli is the nearest rural locality.
