= Ismagilovo =

Ismagilovo Исмагилово
- Selo
- Location within Bashkortostan Location within Russia
- Coordinates: 54°10′N 55°57′E
- Country: Russia
- Region: Bashkortostan
- District: Aurgazinsky District
- Time zone: UTC+5:00

Ismagilovo (Russian: Исмагилово; Bashkir: Исмәғил, İsmäğil) is a rural locality (a selo) and the administrative centre of Ismagilovsky Selsoviet, Aurgazinsky District, Bashkortostan, Russia. The population was 918 as of 2010. There are 8 streets.

== Geography ==
Ismagilovo is located 23 km north of Tolbazy (the district's administrative centre) by road. Ishly is the nearest rural locality.
