= Knyazevka =

Knyazevka Князевка
- Village
- Location within Bashkortostan Location within Russia
- Coordinates: 54°00′N 56°05′E
- Country: Russia
- Region: Bashkortostan
- District: Aurgazinsky District
- Time zone: UTC+5:00

Knyazevka (Russian: Князевка) is a rural locality (a village) in Batyrovsky Selsoviet, Aurgazinsky District, Bashkortostan, Russia. The population was 28 as of 2010. There is 1 street.

== Geography ==
Knyazevka is located 15 km east of Tolbazy (the district's administrative centre) by road. Ivanovka is the nearest rural locality.
