= Tolmachevka =

Tolmachevka Толмачевка
- Village
- Location within Bashkortostan Location within Russia
- Coordinates: 54°02′N 56°10′E
- Country: Russia
- Region: Bashkortostan
- District: Aurgazinsky District
- Time zone: UTC+5:00

Tolmachevka (Russian: Толмачевка) is a rural locality (a village) in Tryapinsky Selsoviet, Aurgazinsky District, Bashkortostan, Russia. The population was 45 as of 2010. There is 1 street.

== Geography ==
Tolmachevka is located 25 km east of Tolbazy (the district's administrative centre) by road. Veselovka is the nearest rural locality.
