= Uchkhoz, Uryupinsky District, Volgograd Oblast =

Uchkhoz Учхоз
- Settlement
- Location within Volgograd Oblast Location within Russia
- Coordinates: 50°50′N 42°06′E
- Country: Russia
- Region: Volgograd Oblast
- District: Uryupinsky District
- Time zone: UTC+4:00

Uchkhoz (Russian: Учхоз) is a rural locality (a settlement) and the administrative center of Krepovskoye Rural Settlement, Uryupinsky District, Volgograd Oblast, Russia. The population was 665 as of 2010. There are 10 streets.

== Geography ==
Uchkhoz is located in steppe, 10 km northeast of Uryupinsk (the district's administrative centre) by road. Kreptovsky is the nearest rural locality.
