= Staroye Ibrayevo =

Staroye Ibrayevo Старое Ибраево
- Village
- Location within Bashkortostan Location within Russia
- Coordinates: 54°07′N 56°02′E
- Country: Russia
- Region: Bashkortostan
- District: Aurgazinsky District
- Time zone: UTC+5:00

Staroye Ibrayevo (Russian: Старое Ибраево; Bashkir: Иҫке Ибрай, İśke İbray) is a rural locality (a village) in Ibrayevsky Selsoviet, Aurgazinsky District, Bashkortostan, Russia. The population was 234 as of 2010. There are 3 streets.

== Geography ==
Staroye Ibrayevo is located 31 km northeast of Tolbazy (the district's administrative centre) by road. Novofyodorovka is the nearest rural locality.
