= Abroskinsky =

Abroskinsky Аброскинский
- Khutor
- Location within Volgograd Oblast Location within Russia
- Coordinates: 50°59′N 41°54′E
- Country: Russia
- Region: Volgograd Oblast
- District: Uryupinsky District
- Time zone: UTC+3:00

Abroskinsky (Russian: Аброскинский) is a rural locality (a khutor) in Mikhaylovskoye Rural Settlement of Uryupinsky District, Volgograd Oblast, Russia. The population was 49 as of 2010.

== Geography ==
The khutor is located in the forest steppe on the border of Khopyorsko-Buzulukskaya plain and flood plains of the Hopyor River, 26 km north of Uryupinsk (the district's administrative centre) by road. Sadkovsky is the nearest rural locality.
