= Berlek =

Berlek Берлек
- Village
- Location within Bashkortostan Location within Russia
- Coordinates: 54°06′N 56°00′E
- Country: Russia
- Region: Bashkortostan
- District: Aurgazinsky District
- Time zone: UTC+5:00

Berlek (Russian: Берлек) is a rural locality (a village) in Ibrayevsky Selsoviet, Aurgazinsky District, Bashkortostan, Russia. The population was 25 as of 2010. There is 1 street.

== Geography ==
Berlek is located 19 km northeast of Tolbazy (the district's administrative centre) by road. Borisovka is the nearest rural locality.
