= Starotimoshkino, Aurgazinsky District, Bashkortostan =

Starotimoshkino Старотимошкино
- Village
- Location within Bashkortostan Location within Russia
- Coordinates: 54°10′N 55°35′E
- Country: Russia
- Region: Bashkortostan
- District: Aurgazinsky District
- Time zone: UTC+5:00

Starotimoshkino (Russian: Старотимошкино; Bashkir: Иҫке Тимешкә, İśke Timeşkä) is a rural locality (a village) in Urshaksky Selsoviet, Aurgazinsky District, Bashkortostan, Russia. The population was 53 as of 2010. There are 2 streets.

== Geography ==
Starotimoshkino is located 32 km northwest of Tolbazy (the district's administrative centre) by road. Novoyanbekovo is the nearest rural locality.
