= Rozovsky, Volgograd Oblast =

Rozovsky Розовский
- Khutor
- Location within Volgograd Oblast Location within Russia
- Coordinates: 50°45′N 41°28′E
- Country: Russia
- Region: Volgograd Oblast
- District: Uryupinsky District
- Time zone: UTC+4:00

Rozovsky (Russian: Розовский) is a rural locality (a khutor) in Iskrinskoye Rural Settlement, Uryupinsky District, Volgograd Oblast, Russia. The population was 60 as of 2010.

== Geography ==
Rozovsky is located in the steppe, 48 km west of Uryupinsk (the district's administrative centre) by road. Dubrovsky is the nearest rural locality.
