= Tursugali =

Tursugali Турсугали
- Village
- Location within Bashkortostan Location within Russia
- Coordinates: 53°58′N 55°42′E
- Country: Russia
- Region: Bashkortostan
- District: Aurgazinsky District
- Time zone: UTC+5:00

Tursugali (Russian: Турсугали; Bashkir: Түрһәгәҙе, Türhägäźe) is a rural locality (a village) in Tashtamaksky Selsoviet, Aurgazinsky District, Bashkortostan, Russia. The population was 175 as of 2010. There are 4 streets.

== Geography ==
Tursugali is located 15 km west of Tolbazy (the district's administrative centre) by road. Gumerovo is the nearest rural locality.
