= Bolshinsky =

Bolshinsky Большинский
- Khutor
- Location within Volgograd Oblast Location within Russia
- Coordinates: 51°02′N 42°08′E
- Country: Russia
- Region: Volgograd Oblast
- District: Uryupinsky District
- Time zone: UTC+4:00

Bolshinsky (Russian: Большинский) is a rural locality (a khutor) in Bolshinskoye Rural Settlement, Uryupinsky District, Volgograd Oblast, Russia. The population was 80 as of 2010.

== Geography ==
Bolshinsky is located in forest steppe, 32 km northeast of Uryupinsk (the district's administrative centre) by road. Serkovsky is the nearest rural locality.

== Cultural references ==
Jazz Jennings real last name is Bloshinsky.
