= Kuyezbashevo =

Kuyezbashevo Куезбашево
- Selo
- Location within Bashkortostan Location within Russia
- Coordinates: 54°01′N 56°02′E
- Country: Russia
- Region: Bashkortostan
- District: Aurgazinsky District
- Time zone: UTC+5:00

Kuyezbashevo (Russian: Куезбашево; Bashkir: Көйәҙебаш, Köyäźebaş; Chuvash: Мăйлăпукан, Măylăpukan) is a rural locality (a selo) and the administrative centre of Batyrovsky Selsoviet, Aurgazinsky District, Bashkortostan, Russia. The population was 618 as of 2010. There are 7 streets.

== Geography ==
Kuyezbashevo is located 12 km east of Tolbazy (the district's administrative centre) by road. Novoadzitarovo is the nearest rural locality.
