= Balyklykul =

Balyklykul Балыклыкуль
- Village
- Location within Bashkortostan Location within Russia
- Coordinates: 53°57′N 55°48′E
- Country: Russia
- Region: Bashkortostan
- District: Aurgazinsky District
- Time zone: UTC+5:00

Balyklykul (Russian: Балыклыкуль; Bashkir: Балыҡлыкүл, Balıqlıkül) is a rural locality (a village) and the administrative centre of Balyklykulsky Selsoviet, Aurgazinsky District, Bashkortostan, Russia. The population was 417 as of 2010. There are 7 streets.

== Geography ==
Balyklykul is located 10 km southwest of Tolbazy (the district's administrative centre) by road. Chishma is the nearest rural locality.
