= Turumbet =

Turumbet Турумбет
- Selo
- Location within Bashkortostan Location within Russia
- Coordinates: 54°00′N 55°31′E
- Country: Russia
- Region: Bashkortostan
- District: Aurgazinsky District
- Time zone: UTC+5:00

Turumbet (Russian: Турумбет; Bashkir: Төрөмбәт, Törömbät) is a rural locality (a selo) and the administrative centre of Turumbetovsky Selsoviet, Aurgazinsky District, Bashkortostan, Russia. The population was 559 as of 2010. There are 7 streets.

== Geography ==
Turumbet is located 28 km west of Tolbazy (the district's administrative centre) by road. Salikhovo is the nearest rural locality.
