= Fedotovsky =

Fedotovsky Федотовский
- Khutor
- Location within Volgograd Oblast Location within Russia
- Coordinates: 50°42′N 42°14′E
- Country: Russia
- Region: Volgograd Oblast
- District: Uryupinsky District
- Time zone: UTC+4:00

Fedotovsky (Russian: Федотовский) is a rural locality (a khutor) in Okladnenskoye Rural Settlement, Uryupinsky District, Volgograd Oblast, Russia. The locality has only 2 streets, and had a population of 70 as of 2010.

== Geography ==
Fedotovsky is located in steppe, 25 km southeast of Uryupinsk (the district's administrative centre) by road. Okladnensky is the nearest rural locality.
