= Podgorinsky =

Podgorinsky Подгоринский
- Khutor
- Location within Volgograd Oblast Location within Russia
- Coordinates: 50°39′N 41°49′E
- Country: Russia
- Region: Volgograd Oblast
- District: Uryupinsky District
- Time zone: UTC+4:00

Podgorinsky (Russian: Подгоринский) is a rural locality (a khutor) in Rossoshinskoye Rural Settlement, Uryupinsky District, Volgograd Oblast, Russia. The population was 116 as of 2010. There are 5 streets.

== Geography ==
Podgorinsky is located in steppe, 36 km southwest of Uryupinsk (the district's administrative centre) by road. Bulekovsky is the nearest rural locality.
