= Potashevka =

Potashevka Поташевка
- Village
- Location within Bashkortostan Location within Russia
- Coordinates: 53°56′N 56°05′E
- Country: Russia
- Region: Bashkortostan
- District: Aurgazinsky District
- Time zone: UTC+5:00

Potashevka (Russian: Поташевка) is a rural locality (a village) in Bishkainsky Selsoviet, Aurgazinsky District, Bashkortostan, Russia. The population was 25 as of 2010. There is one street.

== Geography ==
Potashevka is located 25 km southeast of Tolbazy (the district's administrative centre) by road. Novochelatkanovo is the nearest rural locality.
