= Nizhnekrasnyansky =

Nizhnekrasnyansky Нижнекраснянский
- Khutor
- Location within Volgograd Oblast Location within Russia
- Coordinates: 50°57′N 42°05′E
- Country: Russia
- Region: Volgograd Oblast
- District: Uryupinsky District
- Time zone: UTC+4:00

Nizhnekrasnyansky (Russian: Нижнекраснянский) is a rural locality (a khutor) in Mikhaylovskoye Rural Settlement, Uryupinsky District, Volgograd Oblast, Russia. The population was 80 as of 2010.

== Geography ==
Nizhnekrasnyansky is located in forest steppe, 20 km northeast of Uryupinsk (the district's administrative centre) by road. Vishnyakovsky is the nearest rural locality.
