= Alexandrovka, Aurgazinsky District, Republic of Bashkortostan =

Alexandrovka Александровка
- Village
- Location within Bashkortostan Location within Russia
- Coordinates: 54°02′N 55°43′E
- Country: Russia
- Region: Bashkortostan
- District: Aurgazinsky District

Population (2010)
  - Total: 179
- Time zone: UTC+5:00

Alexandrovka (Russian: Александровка) is a rural locality (a village) in Stepanovsky Selsoviet, Aurgazinsky District, Bashkortostan, Russia. The population was 179 as of 2010.

== Geography ==
Alexandrovka is located 17 km northwest of Tolbazy (the district's administrative centre) by road. Maryanovka is the nearest rural locality.
