= Yakty-Yul =

Yakty-Yul Якты-Юл
- Village
- Location within Bashkortostan Location within Russia
- Coordinates: 54°09′N 55°52′E
- Country: Russia
- Region: Bashkortostan
- District: Aurgazinsky District
- Time zone: UTC+5:00

Yakty-Yul (Russian: Якты-Юл; Bashkir: Яҡты Юл, Yaqtı Yul) is a rural locality (a village) in Ishlinsky Selsoviet, Aurgazinsky District, Bashkortostan, Russia. The population was 52 as of 2010. There is 1 street.

== Geography ==
Yakty-Yul is located 20 km north of Tolbazy (the district's administrative centre) by road. Arslanovo is the nearest rural locality.
