= Krasny Vostok, Aurgazinsky District, Republic of Bashkortostan =

Krasny Vostok Красный Восток
- Village
- Location within Bashkortostan Location within Russia
- Coordinates: 53°49′N 55°46′E
- Country: Russia
- Region: Bashkortostan
- District: Aurgazinsky District
- Time zone: UTC+5:00

Krasny Vostok (Russian: Красный Восток) is a rural locality (a village) in Meselinsky Selsoviet, Aurgazinsky District, Bashkortostan, Russia. The population was 43 as of 2010.

== Geography ==
Krasny Vostok is located 33 km south of Tolbazy (the district's administrative centre) by road. Kamenka is the nearest rural locality.
