= Nazmutdinovo =

Nazmutdinovo Назмутдиново
- Village
- Location within Bashkortostan Location within Russia
- Coordinates: 54°00′N 55°42′E
- Country: Russia
- Region: Bashkortostan
- District: Aurgazinsky District
- Time zone: UTC+5:00

Nazmutdinovo (Russian: Назмутдиново; Bashkir: Нәжметдин, Näjmetdin) is a rural locality (a village) in Stepanovsky Selsoviet, Aurgazinsky District, Bashkortostan, Russia. The population was 54 as of 2010. There is 1 street.

== Geography ==
Nazmutdinovo is located 16 km west of Tolbazy (the district's administrative centre) by road. Stepanovka is the nearest rural locality.
