= Zotov, Volgograd Oblast =

Zotov Зотов
- Khutor
- Location within Volgograd Oblast Location within Russia
- Coordinates: 51°05′N 42°08′E
- Country: Russia
- Region: Volgograd Oblast
- District: Uryupinsky District
- Time zone: UTC+4:00

Zotov (Russian: Зотов) is a rural locality (a khutor) in Khopyoropionerskoye Rural Settlement, Uryupinsky District, Volgograd Oblast, Russia. The population was 33 as of 2010.

== Geography ==
Zotov is located 61 km northeast of Uryupinsk (the district's administrative centre) by road. Kriushinsky is the nearest rural locality.
