= Nizhnebezymyansky =

Nizhnebezymyansky Нижнебезымянский
- Khutor
- Location within Volgograd Oblast Location within Russia
- Coordinates: 50°47′N 41°47′E
- Country: Russia
- Region: Volgograd Oblast
- District: Uryupinsky District
- Time zone: UTC+4:00

Nizhnebezymyansky (Russian: Нижнебезымянский) is a rural locality (a khutor) in Dobrinskoye Rural Settlement, Uryupinsky District, Volgograd Oblast, Russia. The population was 10 as of 2010.

== Geography ==
Nizhnebezymyansky is located in forest steppe, 25 km west of Uryupinsk (the district's administrative centre) by road. Dobrinka is the nearest rural locality.
