= Bakayevo =

Bakayevo Бакаево
- Village
- Location within Bashkortostan Location within Russia
- Coordinates: 54°04′N 55°43′E
- Country: Russia
- Region: Bashkortostan
- District: Aurgazinsky District
- Time zone: UTC+5:00

Bakayevo (Russian: Бакаево; Bashkir: Баҡай, Baqay) is a rural locality (a village) in Sultanmuratovsky Selsoviet, Aurgazinsky District, Bashkortostan, Russia. The population was 20 as of 2010. There is 1 street.

== Geography ==
Bakayevo is located 15 km northwest of Tolbazy (the district's administrative centre) by road. Chishma is the nearest rural locality.
