= Dyurtuli =

Dyurtuli Дюртюли
- Village
- Location within Bashkortostan Location within Russia
- Coordinates: 54°06′N 55°47′E
- Country: Russia
- Region: Bashkortostan
- District: Aurgazinsky District
- Time zone: UTC+5:00

Dyurtuli (Russian: Дюртюли; Bashkir: Дүртөйлө, Dürtöylö) is a rural locality (a village) in Novokalchirovsky Selsoviet, Aurgazinsky District, Bashkortostan, Russia. The population was 349 as of 2010. There are 4 streets.

== Geography ==
Dyurtuli is located 15 km northwest of Tolbazy (the district's administrative centre) by road. Kshanny is the nearest rural locality.
