= Talnik =

Talnik Тальник
- Village
- Location within Bashkortostan Location within Russia
- Coordinates: 53°48′N 55°37′E
- Country: Russia
- Region: Bashkortostan
- District: Aurgazinsky District
- Time zone: UTC+5:00

Talnik (Russian: Тальник) is a rural locality (a village) in Semyonkinsky Selsoviet, Aurgazinsky District, Bashkortostan, Russia. The population was 33 as of 2010. There is 1 street.

== Geography ==
Talnik is located 34 km southwest of Tolbazy (the district's administrative centre) by road. Verkhny Begenyash is the nearest rural locality.
