= Chumakovsky =

Chumakovsky Чумаковский
- Khutor
- Location within Volgograd Oblast Location within Russia
- Coordinates: 50°55′N 42°08′E
- Country: Russia
- Region: Volgograd Oblast
- District: Uryupinsky District
- Time zone: UTC+4:00

Chumakovsky (Russian: Чумаковский) is a rural locality (a khutor) in Vishnyakovskoye Rural Settlement, Uryupinsky District, Volgograd Oblast, Russia. The population was 59 as of 2010. There are 2 streets.

== Geography ==
Chumakovsky is located 29 km northeast of Uryupinsk (the district's administrative centre) by road. Vishnyakovsky is the nearest rural locality.
