= Nagadak =

Nagadak Нагадак
- Village
- Location within Bashkortostan Location within Russia
- Coordinates: 54°03′N 56°13′E
- Country: Russia
- Region: Bashkortostan
- District: Aurgazinsky District
- Time zone: UTC+5:00

Nagadak (Russian: Нагадак; Bashkir: Нуғаҙаҡ, Nuğaźaq) is a rural locality (a village) in Nagadaksky Selsoviet, Aurgazinsky District, Bashkortostan, Russia. The population was 14 as of 2010. There is 1 street.

== Geography ==
Nagadak is located 29 km northeast of Tolbazy (the district's administrative centre) by road. Sofyino is the nearest rural locality.
