= Dyakonovsky 1-y =

Dyakonovsky 1-y Дьяконовский 1-й
- Khutor
- Location within Volgograd Oblast Location within Russia
- Coordinates: 50°38′N 41°58′E
- Country: Russia
- Region: Volgograd Oblast
- District: Uryupinsky District
- Time zone: UTC+4:00

Dyakonovsky 1-y (Russian: Дьяконовский 1-й) is a rural locality (a khutor) and the administrative center of Akchernskoye Rural Settlement, Uryupinsky District, Volgograd Oblast, Russia. The population was 451 as of 2010. There are 10 streets.

== Geography ==
Dyakonovsky 1-y is located on Akchernya River, 20 km southwest of Uryupinsk (the district's administrative centre) by road. Akchernsky is the nearest rural locality.
