= Zaitovo, Aurgazinsky District, Republic of Bashkortostan =

Zaitovo Заитово
- Village
- Location within Bashkortostan Location within Russia
- Coordinates: 54°05′N 56°09′E
- Country: Russia
- Region: Bashkortostan
- District: Aurgazinsky District
- Time zone: UTC+5:00

Zaitovo (Russian: Заитово; Bashkir: Зәйет, Zäyet) is a rural locality (a village) in Tryapinsky Selsoviet, Aurgazinsky District, Bashkortostan, Russia. The population was 178 as of 2010. There are five streets.

== Geography ==
Zaitovo is located 23 km northeast of Tolbazy (the district's administrative centre) by road. Tryapino is the nearest rural locality.
