= Tukayevo =

Tukayevo Тукаево
- Selo
- Location within Bashkortostan Location within Russia
- Coordinates: 54°12′N 55°49′E
- Country: Russia
- Region: Bashkortostan
- District: Aurgazinsky District
- Time zone: UTC+5:00

Tukayevo (Russian: Тукаево; Bashkir: Туҡай, Tuqay) is a rural locality (a selo) and the administrative centre of Tukayevsky Selsoviet, Aurgazinsky District, Bashkortostan, Russia. The population was 547 as of 2010. There are 3 streets.

== Geography ==
Tukayevo is located 27 km north of Tolbazy (the district's administrative centre) by road. Akhmetovo is the nearest rural locality.
