= Chuvashsky Nagadak =

Chuvashsky Nagadak Чувашский Нагадак
- Village
- Location within Bashkortostan Location within Russia
- Coordinates: 54°06′N 56°18′E
- Country: Russia
- Region: Bashkortostan
- District: Aurgazinsky District
- Time zone: UTC+5:00

Chuvashsky Nagadak (Russian: Чувашский Нагадак; Bashkir: Сыуаш Нуғаҙаҡ, Sıwaş Nuğaźaq; Chuvash: Чӑваш Нукасак, Çăvaş Nukasak) is a rural locality (a village) in Nagadaksky Selsoviet, Aurgazinsky District, Bashkortostan, Russia. The population was 408 as of 2010. There are 5 streets.

== Geography ==
Chuvashsky Nagadak is located 41 km northeast of Tolbazy (the district's administrative centre) by road. Tatarsky Nagadak is the nearest rural locality.
