= Tyubyakovo =

Tyubyakovo Тюбяково
- Village
- Location within Bashkortostan Location within Russia
- Coordinates: 54°11′35″N 55°43′02″E
- Country: Russia
- Region: Bashkortostan
- District: Aurgazinsky District
- Time zone: UTC+5:00

Tyubyakovo (Russian: Тюбяково; Bashkir: Төбәк, Töbäk) is a rural locality (a village) in Tukayevsky Selsoviet, Aurgazinsky District, Bashkortostan, Russia. The population was 176 as of 2010. There are 2 streets.

== Geography ==
Tyubyakovo is located 37 km northwest of Tolbazy (the district's administrative centre) by road. Volkovo is the nearest rural locality.
