= Krasnyansky, Uryupinsky District, Volgograd Oblast =

Krasnyansky Краснянский
- Khutor
- Location within Volgograd Oblast Location within Russia
- Coordinates: 50°58′N 42°04′E
- Country: Russia
- Region: Volgograd Oblast
- District: Uryupinsky District
- Time zone: UTC+4:00

Krasnyansky (Russian: Краснянский) is a rural locality (a khutor) in Bolshinskoye Rural Settlement, Uryupinsky District, Volgograd Oblast, Russia. The population was 162 as of 2010. There are 3 streets.

== Geography ==
Krasnyansky is located in forest steppe, 21 km north of Uryupinsk (the district's administrative centre) by road. Nizhnekrasnyansky is the nearest rural locality.
