= Serkovsky =

Serkovsky Серковский
- Khutor
- Location within Volgograd Oblast Location within Russia
- Coordinates: 51°01′N 42°06′E
- Country: Russia
- Region: Volgograd Oblast
- District: Uryupinsky District
- Time zone: UTC+4:00

Serkovsky (Russian: Серковский) is a rural locality (a khutor) in Bolshinskoye Rural Settlement, Uryupinsky District, Volgograd Oblast, Russia. The population was 180 as of 2010.

== Geography ==
The village is located in forest steppe, 36 km from Uryupinsk and 360 km from Volgograd.
