= Krepovsky =

Krepovsky Креповский
- Khutor
- Location within Volgograd Oblast Location within Russia
- Coordinates: 50°50′N 42°05′E
- Country: Russia
- Region: Volgograd Oblast
- District: Uryupinsky District
- Time zone: UTC+4:00

Krepovsky (Russian: Креповский) is a rural locality (a khutor) in Krepovskoye Rural Settlement, Uryupinsky District, Volgograd Oblast, Russia. The population was 356 as of 2010. There are 6 streets.

== Geography ==
Krepovsky is located in steppe, 8 km northeast of Uryupinsk (the district's administrative centre) by road. Uchkhoz is the nearest rural locality.
