= Luchnovsky =

Luchnovsky Лучновский
- Khutor
- Location within Volgograd Oblast Location within Russia
- Coordinates: 50°26′N 41°56′E
- Country: Russia
- Region: Volgograd Oblast
- District: Uryupinsky District
- Time zone: UTC+4:00

Luchnovsky (Russian: Лучновский) is a rural locality (a khutor) in Dubovskoye Rural Settlement, Uryupinsky District, Volgograd Oblast, Russia. The population was 131 in 2010. There are four streets.

== Geography ==
Luchnovsky is located in steppe, 49 kilometres (30 mi) south of Uryupinsk (the district's administrative centre) by road. Buratsky is the nearest rural locality.
