= Chuvash-Karamaly =

Chuvash-Karamaly Чуваш-Карамалы
- Selo
- Location within Bashkortostan Location within Russia
- Coordinates: 53°57′N 56°10′E
- Country: Russia
- Region: Bashkortostan
- District: Aurgazinsky District
- Time zone: UTC+5:00

Chuvash-Karamaly (Russian: Чуваш-Карамалы; Bashkir: Сыуаш-Ҡарамалы, Sıwaş-Qaramalı; Chuvash: Чăваш Хурамалĕ, Çăvaş Xuramalĕ) is a rural locality (a selo) and the administrative centre of Chuvash-Karamalinsky Selsoviet, Aurgazinsky District, Bashkortostan, Russia. The population was 13 as of 2010. There are 12 streets.

== Geography ==
Chuvash-Karamaly is located 24 km southeast of Tolbazy (the district's administrative centre) by road. Starye Karamaly is the nearest rural locality.
