= Uksunny =

Uksunny Уксунны
- Village
- Location within Bashkortostan Location within Russia
- Coordinates: 54°07′N 55°54′E
- Country: Russia
- Region: Bashkortostan
- District: Aurgazinsky District
- Time zone: UTC+5:00

Uksunny (Russian: Уксунны; Bashkir: Уҡҫынны, Uqśınnı) is a rural locality (a village) in Ismagilovsky Selsoviet, Aurgazinsky District, Bashkortostan, Russia. The population was 73 as of 2010. There is 1 street.

== Geography ==
Uksunny is located 15 km north of Tolbazy (the district's administrative centre) by road. Mars is the nearest rural locality.
