= Iskra, Uryupinsky District, Volgograd Oblast =

Iskra Искра
- Settlement
- Location within Volgograd Oblast Location within Russia
- Coordinates: 50°39′N 41°25′E
- Country: Russia
- Region: Volgograd Oblast
- District: Uryupinsky District
- Time zone: UTC+4:00

Iskra (Russian: Искра) is a rural locality (a settlement) and the administrative center of Iskrinskoye Rural Settlement, Uryupinsky District, Volgograd Oblast, Russia. The population was 970 as of 2010. There are 13 streets.

== Geography ==
Iskra is located in steppe, 61 km southwest of Uryupinsk (the district's administrative centre) by road. Kolesniki is the nearest rural locality.
