= Nadezhdino, Aurgazinsky District, Republic of Bashkortostan =

Nadezhdino Надеждино
- Village
- Location within Bashkortostan Location within Russia
- Coordinates: 54°13′N 55°35′E
- Country: Russia
- Region: Bashkortostan
- District: Aurgazinsky District
- Time zone: UTC+5:00

Nadezhdino (Russian: Надеждино) is a rural locality (a village) in Urshaksky Selsoviet, Aurgazinsky District, Bashkortostan, Russia. The population was 42 as of 2010. There are 2 streets.

== Geography ==
Nadezhdino is located 40 km northwest of Tolbazy (the district's administrative centre) by road. Subkhangulovo is the nearest rural locality.
