= Novyye Karamaly =

Novyye Karamaly Новые Карамалы
- Village
- Location within Bashkortostan Location within Russia
- Coordinates: 54°03′N 55°56′E
- Country: Russia
- Region: Bashkortostan
- District: Aurgazinsky District
- Time zone: UTC+5:00

Novyye Karamaly (Russian: Новые Карамалы; Bashkir: Яңы Ҡарамалы, Yañı Qaramalı) is a rural locality (a village) in Novokalchirovsky Selsoviet, Aurgazinsky District, Bashkortostan, Russia. The population was 392 as of 2010. There are 7 streets.

== Geography ==
Novyye Karamaly is located 6 km northeast of Tolbazy (the district's administrative centre) by road. Novoitikeyevo is the nearest rural locality.
