= Salikhovo =

Salikhovo Салихово
- Village
- Location within Bashkortostan Location within Russia
- Coordinates: 54°02′N 55°31′E
- Country: Russia
- Region: Bashkortostan
- District: Aurgazinsky District
- Time zone: UTC+5:00

Salikhovo (Russian: Салихово; Bashkir: Сәлих, Sälix) is a rural locality (a village) in Turumbetovsky Selsoviet, Aurgazinsky District, Bashkortostan, Russia. The population was 4,400 as of 2010. There are 10 streets.

== Geography ==
Salikhovo is located 31 km west of Tolbazy (the district's administrative centre) by road. Turumbet is the nearest rural locality.
