= Maloye Ibrayevo =

Maloye Ibrayevo Малое Ибраево
- Selo
- Location within Bashkortostan Location within Russia
- Coordinates: 54°08′N 56°00′E
- Country: Russia
- Region: Bashkortostan
- District: Aurgazinsky District
- Time zone: UTC+5:00

Maloye Ibrayevo (Russian: Малое Ибраево; Bashkir: Кесе Ибрай, Kese İbray) is a rural locality (a selo) and the administrative centre of Ibrayevsky Selsoviet, Aurgazinsky District, Bashkortostan, Russia. The population was 127 as of 2010. There are 2 streets.

== Geography ==
Maloye Ibrayevo is located 28 km northeast of Tolbazy (the district's administrative centre) by road. Staroye Ibrayevo is the nearest rural locality.
