= Kultura, Aurgazinsky District, Republic of Bashkortostan =

Kultura Культура
- Village
- Location within Bashkortostan Location within Russia
- Coordinates: 53°59′N 55°48′E
- Country: Russia
- Region: Bashkortostan
- District: Aurgazinsky District
- Time zone: UTC+5:00

Kultura (Russian: Культура) is a rural locality (a village) in Tolbazinsky Selsoviet, Aurgazinsky District, Bashkortostan, Russia. The population was 47 as of 2010. There is 1 street.

== Geography ==
Kultura is located 7 km southwest of Tolbazy (the district's administrative centre) by road. Nikolsk is the nearest rural locality.
