= Bishkain =

Bishkain Бишкаин
- Selo
- Location within Bashkortostan Location within Russia
- Coordinates: 53°58′N 56°06′E
- Country: Russia
- Region: Bashkortostan
- District: Aurgazinsky District
- Time zone: UTC+5:00

Bishkain (Russian: Бишкаин; Bashkir: Бишҡайын, Bişqayın; Chuvash: Пишкайăн, Pişkayăn) is a rural locality (a selo) and the administrative centre of Bishkainsky Selsoviet, Aurgazinsky District, Bashkortostan, Russia. The population was 1,150 as of 2010. There are 15 streets.

== Geography ==
Bishkain is located 18 km southeast of Tolbazy (the district's administrative centre) by road. Belogorsky is the nearest rural locality.
