= Novochelatkanovo =

Novochelatkanovo Новочелатканово
- Village
- Location within Bashkortostan Location within Russia
- Coordinates: 53°56′N 56°07′E
- Country: Russia
- Region: Bashkortostan
- District: Aurgazinsky District
- Time zone: UTC+5:00

Novochelatkanovo (Russian: Новочелатканово; Bashkir: Яңы Сылатҡан, Yañı Sılatqan) is a rural locality (a village) in Chuvash-Karamalinsky Selsoviet, Aurgazinsky District, Bashkortostan, Russia. The population was 59 as of 2010. There are 3 streets.

== Geography ==
Novochelatkanovo is located 27 km southeast of Tolbazy (the district's administrative centre) by road. Potashevka is the nearest rural locality.
