= Serkovsky, Krasnyanskoye Rural Settlement, Uryupinsky District, Volgograd Oblast =

Serkovsky Серковский
- Khutor
- Location within Volgograd Oblast Location within Russia
- Coordinates: 50°49′N 42°16′E
- Country: Russia
- Region: Volgograd Oblast
- District: Uryupinsky District
- Time zone: UTC+4:00

Serkovsky (Russian: Серковский) is a rural locality (a khutor) in Krasnyaynskoye Rural Settlement, Uryupinsky District, Volgograd Oblast, Russia. The population was 120 as of 2010.

== Geography ==
The village is located in steppe, 21 km from Uryupinsk and 350 km from Volgograd.
