= Saltynsky =

Saltynsky Салтынский
- Khutor
- Location within Volgograd Oblast Location within Russia
- Coordinates: 51°02′N 41°54′E
- Country: Russia
- Region: Volgograd Oblast
- District: Uryupinsky District
- Time zone: UTC+4:00

Saltynsky (Russian: Салтынский) is a rural locality (a khutor) and the administrative center of Saltynskoye Rural Settlement, Uryupinsky District, Volgograd Oblast, Russia. The population was 638 as of 2010. There are 16 streets.

== Geography ==
Saltynsky is located in steppe, on the right bank of the Saltynka River, 33 km northwest of Uryupinsk (the district's administrative centre) by road. Mokhovskoy is the nearest rural locality.
