= Staromakarovo =

Staromakarovo Старомакарово
- Village
- Location within Bashkortostan Location within Russia
- Coordinates: 53°53′N 55°52′E
- Country: Russia
- Region: Bashkortostan
- District: Aurgazinsky District
- Time zone: UTC+5:00

Staromakarovo (Russian: Старомакарово; Bashkir: Иҫке Маҡар, İśke Maqar) is a rural locality (a village) in Meselinsky Selsoviet, Aurgazinsky District, Bashkortostan, Russia. The population was 172 as of 2010. There are 7 streets.

== Geography ==
Staromakarovo is located 29 km south of Tolbazy (the district's administrative centre) by road. Solovyovka is the nearest rural locality.
