= Vikhlyantsevsky =

Vikhlyantsevsky Вихлянцевский
- Khutor
- Location within Volgograd Oblast Location within Russia
- Coordinates: 50°57′N 41°35′E
- Country: Russia
- Region: Volgograd Oblast
- District: Uryupinsky District
- Time zone: UTC+4:00

Vikhlyantsevsky (Russian: Вихлянцевский) is a rural locality (a khutor) in Bespalovskoye Rural Settlement, Uryupinsky District, Volgograd Oblast, Russia. The population was 174 as of 2010. There are 4 streets.

== Geography ==
Vikhlyantsevsky is located 44 km northwest of Uryupinsk (the district's administrative centre) by road. Astakhovsky is the nearest rural locality.
