= Besplemyanovsky =

Besplemyanovsky Бесплемяновский
- Khutor
- Location within Volgograd Oblast Location within Russia
- Coordinates: 50°44′N 41°51′E
- Country: Russia
- Region: Volgograd Oblast
- District: Uryupinsky District
- Time zone: UTC+4:00

Besplemyanovsky (Russian: Бесплемяновский) is a rural locality (a khutor) in Dobrinskoye Rural Settlement, Uryupinsky District, Volgograd Oblast, Russia. The population was 249 as of 2010. There are 8 streets.

== Geography ==
Besplemyanovsky is located in forest steppe, 20 km southwest of Uryupinsk (the district's administrative centre) by road. Rzhavsky is the nearest rural locality.
