= Skabelinsky =

Skabelinsky Скабелинский
- Khutor
- Location within Volgograd Oblast Location within Russia
- Coordinates: 50°55′N 42°00′E
- Country: Russia
- Region: Volgograd Oblast
- District: Uryupinsky District
- Time zone: UTC+4:00

Skabelinsky (Russian: Скабелинский) is a rural locality (a khutor) in Mikhaylovskoye Rural Settlement, Uryupinsky District, Volgograd Oblast, Russia. The population was 100 as of 2010.

== Geography ==
Skabelinsky is located in steppe, 22 km north of Uryupinsk (the district's administrative centre) by road. Santyrsky is the nearest rural locality.
