= Maneyevo =

Maneyevo Манеево
- Selo
- Location within Bashkortostan Location within Russia
- Coordinates: 53°50′N 55°46′E
- Country: Russia
- Region: Bashkortostan
- District: Aurgazinsky District
- Time zone: UTC+5:00

Maneyevo (Russian: Манеево; Bashkir: Мәнеү, Mänew) is a rural locality (a selo) in Meselinsky Selsoviet, Aurgazinsky District, Bashkortostan, Russia. The population was 360 as of 2010. There are 8 streets.

== Geography ==
Maneyevo is located 32 km south of Tolbazy (the district's administrative centre) by road. Meseli is the nearest rural locality.
