= Shlanly =

Shlanly Шланлы
- Selo
- Location within Bashkortostan Location within Russia
- Coordinates: 53°52′N 55°40′E
- Country: Russia
- Region: Bashkortostan
- District: Aurgazinsky District
- Time zone: UTC+5:00

Shlanly (Russian: Шланлы; Bashkir: Шланлы, Şlanlı; Chuvash: Шланлă, Şlanlă) is a rural locality (a selo) in Semyonkinsky Selsoviet, Aurgazinsky District, Bashkortostan, Russia. The population was 702 as of 2010. There are 5 streets.

== Geography ==
Shlanly is located 30 km southwest of Tolbazy (the district's administrative centre) by road. Abdullino is the nearest rural locality.
