= Kolesniki, Volgograd Oblast =

Kolesniki Колесники
- Khutor
- Location within Volgograd Oblast Location within Russia
- Coordinates: 50°40′N 41°24′E
- Country: Russia
- Region: Volgograd Oblast
- District: Uryupinsky District
- Time zone: UTC+4:00

Kolesniki (Russian: Колесники) is a rural locality (a khutor) in Iskrinskoye Rural Settlement, Uryupinsky District, Volgograd Oblast, Russia. The population was 29 as of 2010.

== Geography ==
Kolesniki is located in steppe, 63 km southwest of Uryupinsk (the district's administrative centre) by road. Iskra is the nearest rural locality.
