= Chubaytal =

Chubaytal Чубайтал
- Village
- Location within Bashkortostan Location within Russia
- Coordinates: 54°03′N 55°46′E
- Country: Russia
- Region: Bashkortostan
- District: Aurgazinsky District
- Time zone: UTC+5:00

Chubaytal (Russian: Чубайтал; Bashkir: Сыбайтал, Sıbaytal) is a rural locality (a village) in Sultanmuratovsky Selsoviet, Aurgazinsky District, Bashkortostan, Russia. The population was 75 as of 2010. There is 1 street.

== Geography ==
Chubaytal is located 12 km northwest of Tolbazy (the district's administrative centre) by road. Alexeyevka is the nearest rural locality.
