= Mars, Aurgazinsky District, Republic of Bashkortostan =

Mars Марс
- Village
- Location within Bashkortostan Location within Russia
- Coordinates: 54°06′N 55°54′E
- Country: Russia
- Region: Bashkortostan
- District: Aurgazinsky District
- Time zone: UTC+5:00

Mars (Russian: Марс) is a rural locality (a village) in Novokalchirovsky Selsoviet, Aurgazinsky District, Bashkortostan, Russia. The population was 33 as of 2010. There is 1 street.

== Geography ==
Mars is located 12 km north of Tolbazy (the district's administrative centre) by road. Uksunny is the nearest rural locality.
