= Novomustafino =

Novomustafino Новомустафино
- Village
- Location within Bashkortostan Location within Russia
- Coordinates: 54°02′N 56°06′E
- Country: Russia
- Region: Bashkortostan
- District: Aurgazinsky District
- Time zone: UTC+5:00

Novomustafino (Russian: Новомустафино; Bashkir: Яңы Мостафа, Yañı Mostafa) is a rural locality (a village) in Batyrovsky Selsoviet, Aurgazinsky District, Bashkortostan, Russia. The population was 49 as of 2010. There is 1 street.

== Geography ==
Novomustafino is located 22 km east of Tolbazy (the district's administrative centre) by road. Nikolayevka is the nearest rural locality.
