= Naumkino =

Naumkino Наумкино
- Village
- Location within Bashkortostan Location within Russia
- Coordinates: 53°53′N 55°46′E
- Country: Russia
- Region: Bashkortostan
- District: Aurgazinsky District
- Time zone: UTC+5:00

Naumkino (Russian: Наумкино) is a rural locality (a village) in Balyklykulsky Selsoviet, Aurgazinsky District, Bashkortostan, Russia. The population was 699 as of 2010. There are 7 streets.

== Geography ==
Naumkino is located 17 km southwest of Tolbazy (the district's administrative centre) by road. Amzya is the nearest rural locality.
