= Staraya Ivanovka =

Staraya Ivanovka Старая Ивановка
- Village
- Location within Bashkortostan Location within Russia
- Coordinates: 54°13′N 55°47′E
- Country: Russia
- Region: Bashkortostan
- District: Aurgazinsky District
- Time zone: UTC+5:00

Staraya Ivanovka (Russian: Старая Ивановка) is a rural locality (a village) in Tukayevsky Selsoviet, Aurgazinsky District, Bashkortostan, Russia. The population was 18 as of 2010. There are 3 streets.

== Geography ==
Staraya Ivanovka is located 30 km north of Tolbazy (the district's administrative centre) by road. Akhmetovo is the nearest rural locality.
