= Nizhnetseplyayevsky =

Nizhnetseplyayevsky Нижнецепляевский
- Khutor
- Location within Volgograd Oblast Location within Russia
- Coordinates: 50°58′N 42°05′E
- Country: Russia
- Region: Volgograd Oblast
- District: Uryupinsky District
- Time zone: UTC+4:00

Nizhnetseplyayevsky (Russian: Нижнецепляевский) is a rural locality (a khutor) and the administrative center of Bolshinskoye Rural Settlement, Uryupinsky District, Volgograd Oblast, Russia. The population was 269 as of 2010. There are 2 streets.

== Geography ==
Nizhnetseplyayevsky is located 23 km northeast of Uryupinsk (the district's administrative centre) by road. Serkovsky is the nearest rural locality.
