= Kukhtinsky =

Kukhtinsky Кухтинский
- Khutor
- Location within Volgograd Oblast Location within Russia
- Coordinates: 50°48′N 42°16′E
- Country: Russia
- Region: Volgograd Oblast
- District: Uryupinsky District
- Time zone: UTC+4:00

Kukhtinsky (Russian: Кухтинский) is a rural locality (a khutor) in Krasnyaynskoye Rural Settlement, Uryupinsky District, Volgograd Oblast, Russia. The population was 22 as of 2010. There are 2 streets.

== Geography ==
Kukhtinsky is located in steppe, 21 km east of Uryupinsk (the district's administrative centre) by road. Krasny is the nearest rural locality.
