= Verkhny Begenyash =

Verkhny Begenyash Верхний Бегеняш
- Village
- Location within Bashkortostan Location within Russia
- Coordinates: 54°06′N 56°00′E
- Country: Russia
- Region: Bashkortostan
- District: Aurgazinsky District
- Time zone: UTC+5:00

Verkhny Begenyash (Russian: Верхний Бегеняш; Bashkir: Үрге Бәгәнәш, Ürge Bägänäş) is a rural locality (a village) in Semyonkinsky Selsoviet, Aurgazinsky District, Bashkortostan, Russia. The population was 95 as of 2010. There is 1 street.

== Geography ==
Verkhny Begenyash is located 32 km southwest of Tolbazy (the district's administrative centre) by road. Talnik is the nearest rural locality.
