= Grigoryevsky =

Grigoryevsky Григорьевский
- Khutor
- Location within Volgograd Oblast Location within Russia
- Coordinates: 50°51′N 41°40′E
- Country: Russia
- Region: Volgograd Oblast
- District: Uryupinsky District
- Time zone: UTC+4:00

Grigoryevsky (Russian: Григорьевский) is a rural locality (a khutor) in Dobrinskoye Rural Settlement, Uryupinsky District, Volgograd Oblast, Russia. The population was 43 as of 2010. There are 2 streets.

== Geography ==
Grigoryevsky is located in steppe, 33 km northwest of Uryupinsk (the district's administrative centre) by road. Olkhovsky is the nearest rural locality.
