= Kudryashyovsky =

Kudryashyovsky Кудряшёвский
- Khutor
- Location within Volgograd Oblast Location within Russia
- Coordinates: 50°51′N 41°45′E
- Country: Russia
- Region: Volgograd Oblast
- District: Uryupinsky District
- Time zone: UTC+4:00

Kudryashyovsky (Russian: Кудряшёвский) is a rural locality (a khutor) in Dobrinskoye Rural Settlement, Uryupinsky District, Volgograd Oblast, Russia. The population was 153 as of 2010. There are 4 streets.

== Geography ==
Kudryashyovsky is located in steppe, 28 km northwest of Uryupinsk (the district's administrative centre) by road. Yegorovsky is the nearest rural locality.
