= Uvarovsky (rural locality) =

Uvarovsky (Russian: Уваровский; masculine), Uvarovskaya (Уваровская; feminine), or Uvarovskoye (Уваровское; neuter) is the name of several rural localities in Russia:

- Uvarovsky, Tambov Oblast, a settlement in Troitsky Selsoviet of Muchkapsky District of Tambov Oblast
- Uvarovsky, Volgograd Oblast, a khutor in Khoperopionersky Selsoviet of Uryupinsky District of Volgograd Oblast
- Uvarovskoye, Kaluga Oblast, a village in Borovsky District of Kaluga Oblast
- Uvarovskoye, Stavropol Krai, a selo in Russky Selsoviet of Kursky District of Stavropol Krai
- Uvarovskaya, Kirov Oblast, a village in Pashinsky Rural Okrug of Afanasyevsky District of Kirov Oblast
- Uvarovskaya, Vologda Oblast, a village in Seredsky Selsoviet of Totemsky District of Vologda Oblast
