= Vdovolsky =

Vdovolsky Вдовольский
- Khutor
- Location within Volgograd Oblast Location within Russia
- Coordinates: 50°54′N 41°56′E
- Country: Russia
- Region: Volgograd Oblast
- District: Uryupinsky District
- Time zone: UTC+4:00

Vdovolsky (Russian: Вдовольский) is a rural locality (a khutor) in Kotovskoye Rural Settlement, Uryupinsky District, Volgograd Oblast, Russia. The population was 79 as of 2010. There are 2 streets.

== Geography ==
Vdovolsky is located 2 km east of Khopyor River, 19 km northwest of Uryupinsk (the district's administrative centre) by road. Skabelinsky is the nearest rural locality.
