= Uteymullino =

Uteymullino Утеймуллино
- Village
- Location within Bashkortostan Location within Russia
- Coordinates: 54°07′N 56°14′E
- Country: Russia
- Region: Bashkortostan
- District: Aurgazinsky District
- Time zone: UTC+5:00

Uteymullino (Russian: Утеймуллино; Bashkir: Үтәймулла, Ütäymulla) is a rural locality (a village) in Nagadaksky Selsoviet, Aurgazinsky District, Bashkortostan, Russia. The population was 379 as of 2010. There are 5 streets.

== Geography ==
Uteymullino is located 42 km northeast of Tolbazy (the district's administrative centre) by road. Verkhniye Lekandy is the nearest rural locality.
