= Zelyony, Uryupinsky District, Volgograd Oblast =

Zelyony Зелёный
- Khutor
- Location within Volgograd Oblast Location within Russia
- Coordinates: 50°40′N 42°16′E
- Country: Russia
- Region: Volgograd Oblast
- District: Uryupinsky District
- Time zone: UTC+4:00

Zelyony (Russian: Зелёный) is a rural locality (a khutor) in Okladnenskoye Rural Settlement, Uryupinsky District, Volgograd Oblast, Russia. The population was 46 as of 2010. There are 2 streets.

== Geography ==
Zelyony is located in forest steppe, 31 km southeast of Uryupinsk (the district's administrative centre) by road. Dolgy is the nearest rural locality.
