= Maly Nagadak =

Maly Nagadak Малый Нагадак
- Village
- Location within Bashkortostan Location within Russia
- Coordinates: 54°03′N 56°13′E
- Country: Russia
- Region: Bashkortostan
- District: Aurgazinsky District
- Time zone: UTC+5:00

Maly Nagadak (Russian: Малый Нагадак; Bashkir: Кесе Нуғаҙаҡ, Kese Nuğaźaq; Chuvash: Кăтаймас, Kătaymas) is a rural locality (a village) in Tryapinsky Selsoviet, Aurgazinsky District, Bashkortostan, Russia. The population was 175 as of 2010. There are 4 streets.

== Geography ==
Maly Nagadak is located 29 km east of Tolbazy (the district's administrative centre) by road. Sofyino is the nearest rural locality.
