= Sitdik-Mullino =

Sitdik-Mullino Ситдик-Муллино
- Village
- Location within Bashkortostan Location within Russia
- Coordinates: 53°58′N 55°59′E
- Country: Russia
- Region: Bashkortostan
- District: Aurgazinsky District
- Time zone: UTC+5:00

Sitdik-Mullino (Russian: Ситдик-Муллино; Bashkir: Ситдиҡ-Мулла, Sitdiq-Mulla) is a rural locality (a village) in Kebyachevsky Selsoviet, Aurgazinsky District, Bashkortostan, Russia. The population was 57 as of 2010. There is 1 street.

== Geography ==
Sitdik-Mullino is located 15 km southeast of Tolbazy (the district's administrative centre) by road. Tashlykul is the nearest rural locality.
