= Semyonkino =

Semyonkino Семёнкино
- Selo
- Location within Bashkortostan Location within Russia
- Coordinates: 53°48′N 55°42′E
- Country: Russia
- Region: Bashkortostan
- District: Aurgazinsky District
- Time zone: UTC+5:00

Semyonkino (Russian: Семёнкино) is a rural locality (a selo) and the administrative centre of Semyonkinsky Selsoviet, Aurgazinsky District, Bashkortostan, Russia. The population was 679 as of 2010. There are 7 streets.

== Geography ==
Semyonkino is located 29 km southwest of Tolbazy (the district's administrative centre) by road. Asavbashevo is the nearest rural locality.
