= Ust-Belishevo =

Ust-Belishevo Усть-Белишево
- Village
- Location within Bashkortostan Location within Russia
- Coordinates: 54°08′N 56°20′E
- Country: Russia
- Region: Bashkortostan
- District: Aurgazinsky District
- Time zone: UTC+5:00

Ust-Belishevo (Russian: Усть-Белишево; Bashkir: Өсбәлеш, Ösbäleş) is a rural locality (a village) in Nagadaksky Selsoviet, Aurgazinsky District, Bashkortostan, Russia. The population was 57 as of 2010. There is 1 street.

== Geography ==
Ust-Belishevo is located 46 km northeast of Tolbazy (the district's administrative centre) by road. Malaya Ivanovka is the nearest rural locality.
