= Ibrayevo, Aurgazinsky District, Republic of Bashkortostan =

Ibrayevo Ибраево
- Village
- Location within Bashkortostan Location within Russia
- Coordinates: 53°56′N 56°00′E
- Country: Russia
- Region: Bashkortostan
- District: Aurgazinsky District
- Time zone: UTC+5:00

Ibrayevo (Russian: Ибраево; Bashkir: Ибрай, İbray) is a rural locality (a village) in Kebyachevsky Selsoviet, Aurgazinsky District, Bashkortostan, Russia. The population was 36 as of 2010. There is 1 street.

== Geography ==
Ibrayevo is located 16 km southeast of Tolbazy (the district's administrative centre) by road. Trudovka is the nearest rural locality.
