= Gromlenovsky =

Gromlenovsky Громленовский
- Khutor
- Location within Volgograd Oblast Location within Russia
- Coordinates: 50°43′N 41°25′E
- Country: Russia
- Region: Volgograd Oblast
- District: Uryupinsky District
- Time zone: UTC+4:00

Gromlenovsky (Russian: Громленовский) is a rural locality (a khutor) in Iskrinskoye Rural Settlement, Uryupinsky District, Volgograd Oblast, Russia. The population was 43 as of 2010.

== Geography ==
Gromlenovsky is located in steppe, 54 km southwest of Uryupinsk (the district's administrative centre) by road. Rozovsky is the nearest rural locality.
