= Baishevo =

Baishevo Баишево
- Village
- Location within Bashkortostan Location within Russia
- Coordinates: 54°06′N 55°57′E
- Country: Russia
- Region: Bashkortostan
- District: Aurgazinsky District
- Time zone: UTC+5:00

Baishevo (Russian: Баишево; Bashkir: Байыш, Bayış) is a rural locality (a village) in Ibrayevsky Selsoviet, Aurgazinsky District, Bashkortostan, Russia. The population was 54 as of 2010. There is one street.

== Geography ==
Baishevo is located 16 km north of Tolbazy (the district's administrative centre) by road. Borisovka is the nearest rural locality.
