= Novogurovka =

Novogurovka Новогуровка
- Village
- Location within Bashkortostan Location within Russia
- Coordinates: 54°05′N 56°10′E
- Country: Russia
- Region: Bashkortostan
- District: Aurgazinsky District
- Time zone: UTC+5:00

Novogurovka (Russian: Новогуровка) is a rural locality (a village) in Tryapinsky Selsoviet, Aurgazinsky District, Bashkortostan, Russia. The population was 93 as of 2010. There is 1 street.

== Geography ==
Novogurovka is located 26 km northeast of Tolbazy (the district's administrative centre) by road. Tryapino is the nearest rural locality.
