= Provotorovsky =

Provotorovsky Провоторовский
- Khutor
- Location within Volgograd Oblast Location within Russia
- Coordinates: 50°30′N 41°56′E
- Country: Russia
- Region: Volgograd Oblast
- District: Uryupinsky District
- Time zone: UTC+4:00

Provotorovsky (Russian: Провоторовский) is a rural locality (a khutor) in Dubovskoye Rural Settlement, Uryupinsky District, Volgograd Oblast, Russia. The population was 302 as of 2010. There are 3 streets.

== Geography ==
Provotorovsky is located in forest steppe, 38 km south of Uryupinsk (the district's administrative centre) by road. Zakhopersky is the nearest rural locality.
