= Yulamanovo =

Yulamanovo Юламаново
- Village
- Location within Bashkortostan Location within Russia
- Coordinates: 54°01′N 55°49′E
- Country: Russia
- Region: Bashkortostan
- District: Aurgazinsky District
- Time zone: UTC+5:00

Yulamanovo (Russian: Юламаново; Bashkir: Юламан, Yulaman) is a rural locality (a village) in Tolbazinsky Selsoviet, Aurgazinsky District, Bashkortostan, Russia. The population was 407 as of 2010. There are 8 streets.

== Geography ==
Yulamanovo is located 6 km northwest of Tolbazy (the district's administrative centre) by road. Tolbazy is the nearest rural locality.
