= Ishly =

Ishly Ишлы
- Selo
- Location within Bashkortostan Location within Russia
- Coordinates: 54°11′N 55°54′E
- Country: Russia
- Region: Bashkortostan
- District: Aurgazinsky District
- Time zone: UTC+5:00

Ishly (Russian: Ишлы; Bashkir and Tatar: Ишле, İşle) is a rural locality (a selo) and the administrative center of Ishlinsky Selsoviet, Aurgazinsky District, Bashkortostan, Russia. The population was 884 as of 2010. There are 14 streets.

== Geography ==
Ishly is located 21 km north of Tolbazy (the district's administrative centre) by road. Yakty-Yul is the nearest rural locality.
