= Tashtamak =

Tashtamak Таштамак
- Village
- Location within Bashkortostan Location within Russia
- Coordinates: 53°57′N 55°44′E
- Country: Russia
- Region: Bashkortostan
- District: Aurgazinsky District
- Time zone: UTC+5:00

Tashtamak (Russian: Таштамак; Bashkir: Таштамаҡ, Taştamaq) is a rural locality (a village) and the administrative centre of Tashtamaksky Selsoviet, Aurgazinsky District, Bashkortostan, Russia. The population was 561 as of 2010. There are 7 streets.

== Geography ==
Tashtamak is located 12 km southwest of Tolbazy (the district's administrative centre) by road. Gumerovo is the nearest rural locality.
