= Bolotino =

Bolotino Болотино
- Selo
- Location within Bashkortostan Location within Russia
- Coordinates: 54°10′N 55°49′E
- Country: Russia
- Region: Bashkortostan
- District: Aurgazinsky District
- Time zone: UTC+5:00

Bolotino (Russian: Болотино) is a rural locality (a selo) in Tukayevsky Selsoviet, Aurgazinsky District, Bashkortostan, Russia. The population was 281 as of 2010. There are 2 streets.

== Geography ==
Bolotino is located 28 km north of Tolbazy (the district's administrative centre) by road. Yakty-Yul is the nearest rural locality.
