= Kshanny =

Kshanny Кшанны
- Village
- Location within Bashkortostan Location within Russia
- Coordinates: 54°05′N 55°48′E
- Country: Russia
- Region: Bashkortostan
- District: Aurgazinsky District
- Time zone: UTC+5:00

Kshanny (Russian: Кшанны; Bashkir: Кешәнне, Keşänne) is a rural locality (a village) in Novokalchirovsky Selsoviet, Aurgazinsky District, Bashkortostan, Russia. The population was 417 as of 2010. There are 7 streets.

== Geography ==
Kshanny is located 14 km northwest of Tolbazy (the district's administrative centre) by road. Dyurtyuli is the nearest rural locality.
