= Vishnyakovsky =

Vishnyakovsky Вишняковский
- Khutor
- Location within Volgograd Oblast Location within Russia
- Coordinates: 50°56′N 42°06′E
- Country: Russia
- Region: Volgograd Oblast
- District: Uryupinsky District
- Time zone: UTC+4:00

Vishnyakovsky (Russian: Вишняковский) is a rural locality (a khutor) and the administrative center of Vishnyakovskoye Rural Settlement, Uryupinsky District, Volgograd Oblast, Russia. The population was 326 as of 2010. There are 9 streets.

== Geography ==
Vishnyakovsky is located in forest steppe, 21 km northeast of Uryupinsk (the district's administrative centre) by road. Nizhnekrasnyansky is the nearest rural locality.
