= Novoadzitarovo =

Russian Village

Novoadzitarovo Новоадзитарово
- Village
- Location within Bashkortostan Location within Russia
- Coordinates: 54°00′N 56°02′E
- Country: Russia
- Region: Bashkortostan
- District: Aurgazinsky District
- Time zone: UTC+5:00

Novoadzitarovo (Russian: Новоадзитарово; Bashkir: Яңы Атйетәр, Yañı Atyetär) is a rural locality (a village) in Batyrovsky Selsoviet, Aurgazinsky District, Bashkortostan, Russia. The population was 372 as of 2010. There are 7 streets.

== Geography ==
Novoadzitarovo is located 12 km east of Tolbazy (the district's administrative centre) by road. Kuyezbashevo is the nearest rural locality.
