= Osipovsky =

Osipovsky Осиповский
- Khutor
- Location within Volgograd Oblast Location within Russia
- Coordinates: 50°51′N 42°16′E
- Country: Russia
- Region: Volgograd Oblast
- District: Uryupinsky District
- Time zone: UTC+4:00

Osipovsky (Russian: Осиповский) is a rural locality (a khutor) in Krasnyaynskoye Rural Settlement, Uryupinsky District, Volgograd Oblast, Russia. The population was 28 as of 2010. There are 4 streets.

== Geography ==
Osipovsky is located 22 km northeast of Uryupinsk (the district's administrative centre) by road. Serkovsky is the nearest rural locality.
