= Kriushinsky =

Kriushinsky Криушинский
- Khutor
- Location within Volgograd Oblast Location within Russia
- Coordinates: 51°07′N 42°07′E
- Country: Russia
- Region: Volgograd Oblast
- District: Uryupinsky District
- Time zone: UTC+4:00

Kriushinsky (Russian: Криушинский) is a rural locality (a khutor) and the administrative center of Khopyoropionerskoye Rural Settlement, Uryupinsky District, Volgograd Oblast, Russia. The population was 783 as of 2010. There are 9 streets.

== Geography ==
Kriushinsky is located in steppe, 57 km north of Uryupinsk (the district's administrative centre) by road. Povorino is the nearest rural locality.
