= Akishin, Volgograd Oblast =

Akishin Акишин
- Khutor
- Location within Volgograd Oblast Location within Russia
- Coordinates: 50°46′N 42°08′E
- Country: Russia
- Region: Volgograd Oblast
- District: Uryupinsky District
- Time zone: UTC+4:00

Akishin (Russian: Акишин) is a rural locality (a khutor) in Dyakonovskoye Rural Settlement, Uryupinsky District, Volgograd Oblast, Russia. The population was 182 as of 2010. There are 3 streets.

== Geography ==
Akishin is located in forest steppe, 10 km southeast of Uryupinsk (the district's administrative centre) by road. Dyakonovsky 2-y is the nearest rural locality.
