= Dolgovsky =

Dolgovsky Долговский
- Khutor
- Location within Volgograd Oblast Location within Russia
- Coordinates: 50°38′N 41°57′E
- Country: Russia
- Region: Volgograd Oblast
- District: Uryupinsky District
- Time zone: UTC+4:00

Dolgovsky (Russian: Долговский) is a rural locality (a khutor) in Akchernskoye Rural Settlement, Uryupinsky District, Volgograd Oblast, Russia. The population was 274 as of 2010. There are 9 streets.

== Geography ==
Dolgovsky is located in steppe, 22 km southwest of Uryupinsk (the district's administrative centre) by road. Dyakonovsky 1-y is the nearest rural locality.
