= Novoitikeyevo =

Novoitikeyevo Новоитикеево
- Village
- Location within Bashkortostan Location within Russia
- Coordinates: 54°01′N 55°58′E
- Country: Russia
- Region: Bashkortostan
- District: Aurgazinsky District
- Time zone: UTC+5:00

Novoitikeyevo (Russian: Новоитикеево; Bashkir: Яңы Этекәй, Yañı Etekäy) is a rural locality (a village) in Batyrovsky Selsoviet, Aurgazinsky District, Bashkortostan, Russia. The population was 425 as of 2010. There are 8 streets.

== Geography ==
Novoitikeyevo is located 6 km east of Tolbazy (the district's administrative centre) by road. Staroitikeyevo is the nearest rural locality.
