= Yermolayevka =

Yermolayevka Ермолаевка
- Village
- Location within Bashkortostan Location within Russia
- Coordinates: 54°06′N 55°47′E
- Country: Russia
- Region: Bashkortostan
- District: Aurgazinsky District
- Time zone: UTC+5:00

Yermolayevka (Russian: Ермолаевка) is a rural locality (a village) in Chuvash-Karamalinsky Selsoviet, Aurgazinsky District, Bashkortostan, Russia. The population was 3 as of 2010. There is 1 street.

== Geography ==
Yermolayevka is located 27 km southeast of Tolbazy (the district's administrative centre) by road. Novochelatkanovo is the nearest rural locality.
