= Mokhovskoy =

Mokhovskoy Моховской
- Khutor
- Location within Volgograd Oblast Location within Russia
- Coordinates: 51°01′N 41°54′E
- Country: Russia
- Region: Volgograd Oblast
- District: Uryupinsky District
- Time zone: UTC+4:00

Mokhovskoy (Russian: Моховской) is a rural locality (a khutor) in Saltynskoye Rural Settlement, Uryupinsky District, Volgograd Oblast, Russia. The population was 225 as of 2010. There are 10 streets.

== Geography ==
Mokhovskoy is located in steppe, 32 km north of Uryupinsk (the district's administrative centre) by road. Firsovsky is the nearest rural locality.
