= Staroitikeyevo =

Staroitikeyevo Староитикеево
- Village
- Location within Bashkortostan Location within Russia
- Coordinates: 54°02′N 55°59′E
- Country: Russia
- Region: Bashkortostan
- District: Aurgazinsky District
- Time zone: UTC+5:00

Staroitikeyevo (Russian: Староитикеево; Bashkir: Иҫке Этекәй, İśke Etekäy) is a rural locality (a village) in Batyrovsky Selsoviet, Aurgazinsky District, Bashkortostan, Russia. The population was 197 as of 2010. There are four streets.

== Geography ==
Staroitikeyevo is located 8 km northeast of Tolbazy (the district's administrative centre) by road. Novoitikeyevo is the nearest rural locality.
