= Studyonovsky =

Studyonovsky Студёновский
- Khutor
- Location within Volgograd Oblast Location within Russia
- Coordinates: 50°52′N 41°51′E
- Country: Russia
- Region: Volgograd Oblast
- District: Uryupinsky District
- Time zone: UTC+4:00

Studyonovsky (Russian: Студёновский) is a rural locality (a khutor) in Dobrinskoye Rural Settlement, Uryupinsky District, Volgograd Oblast, Russia. The population was 29 as of 2010.

== Geography ==
Studyonovsky is located 25 km northwest of Uryupinsk (the district's administrative centre) by road. Topolyovsky is the nearest rural locality.
