= Shemyakinsky =

Shemyakinsky Шемякинский
- Khutor
- Location within Volgograd Oblast Location within Russia
- Coordinates: 50°41′N 41°37′E
- Country: Russia
- Region: Volgograd Oblast
- District: Uryupinsky District
- Time zone: UTC+4:00

Shemyakinsky (Russian: Шемякинский) is a rural locality (a khutor) in Rossoshinskoye Rural Settlement, Uryupinsky District, Volgograd Oblast, Russia. The population was 154 as of 2010. There are 4 streets.

== Geography ==
Shemyakinsky is located 39 km southeast of Uryupinsk (the district's administrative centre) by road. Verkhnesoinsky is the nearest rural locality.
