= Staryye Karamaly =

Staryye Karamaly Старые Карамалы
- Village
- Location within Bashkortostan Location within Russia
- Coordinates: 53°56′N 56°09′E
- Country: Russia
- Region: Bashkortostan
- District: Aurgazinsky District
- Time zone: UTC+5:00

Staryye Karamaly (Russian: Старые Карамалы; Bashkir: Иҫке Ҡарамалы, İşke Qaramalı) is a rural locality (a village) in Chuvash-Karamalinsky Selsoviet, Aurgazinsky District, Bashkortostan, Russia. The population was 26 as of 2010. There are 2 streets.

== Geography ==
Staryye Karamaly is located 27 km southeast of Tolbazy (the district's administrative centre) by road. Chuvash-Karamaly is the nearest rural locality.
