= Verkhniye Lekandy =

Verkhniye Lekandy Верхние Леканды
- Village
- Location within Bashkortostan Location within Russia
- Coordinates: 54°06′N 56°14′E
- Country: Russia
- Region: Bashkortostan
- District: Aurgazinsky District
- Time zone: UTC+5:00

Verkhniye Lekandy (Russian: Верхние Леканды; Bashkir: Үрге Ләкәнде, Ürge Läkände; Tatar: Югары Лекәнде, Yuğarı Lekände) is a rural locality (a village) in Nagadaksky Selsoviet, Aurgazinsky District, Bashkortostan, Russia. The population was 72 as of 2010. There is 1 street.

== Geography ==
Verkhniye Lekandy is located 41 km northeast of Tolbazy (the district's administrative centre) by road. Uteymullino is the nearest rural locality.
