= Bryansky (rural locality) =

Bryansky (Russian: Бря́нский; masculine), Bryanskaya (Бря́нская; feminine), or Bryanskoye (Бря́нское; neuter) is the name of several rural localities in Russia:

- Bryansky, Astrakhan Oblast, a settlement in Seitovsky Selsoviet of Krasnoyarsky District of Astrakhan Oblast
- Bryansky, Lipetsk Oblast, a settlement in Safonovsky Selsoviet of Dobrinsky District of Lipetsk Oblast
- Bryansky, Novosibirsk Oblast, a settlement in Dovolensky District of Novosibirsk Oblast
- Bryansky, Rostov Oblast, a khutor in Kamyshevskoye Rural Settlement of Zimovnikovsky District of Rostov Oblast
- Bryansky, Volgograd Oblast, a khutor in Rossoshinsky Selsoviet of Uryupinsky District of Volgograd Oblast
- Bryanskoye, a settlement under the administrative jurisdiction of Gusev Town of District Significance, Gusevsky District, Kaliningrad Oblast
