= Usmanovo, Turumbetovsky Selsoviet, Aurgazinsky District, Republic of Bashkortostan =

Usmanovo Усманово
- Village
- Nickname: Kazburun.
- Location within Bashkortostan Location within Russia
- Coordinates: 54°04′N 55°32′E
- Country: Russia
- Region: Bashkortostan
- District: Aurgazinsky District
- Time zone: UTC+5:00

Usmanovo (Russian: Усманово; Bashkir: Уҫман, Uśman) is a rural locality (a village) in Turumbetovsky Selsoviet, Aurgazinsky District, Bashkortostan, Russia. The population was 279 as of 2010.

Demonym and the second name of the village of Usmanovo is Kazburun.

== Geography ==
It is located 26 km from Tolbazy and 6 km from Turumbet.
