= Bryansky, Volgograd Oblast =

Bryansky Брянский
- Khutor
- Location within Volgograd Oblast Location within Russia
- Coordinates: 50°40′N 41°45′E
- Country: Russia
- Region: Volgograd Oblast
- District: Uryupinsky District
- Time zone: UTC+4:00

Bryansky (Russian: Брянский) is a rural locality (a khutor) in Rossoshinskoye Rural Settlement, Uryupinsky District, Volgograd Oblast, Russia. The population was 92 as of 2010.

== Geography ==
Bryansky is located 35 km southwest of Uryupinsk (the district's administrative centre) by road. Rossoshinsky is the nearest rural locality.
