= Stepanovka, Aurgazinsky District, Republic of Bashkortostan =

Stepanovka Степановка
- Selo
- Location within Bashkortostan Location within Russia
- Coordinates: 54°00′N 55°41′E
- Country: Russia
- Region: Bashkortostan
- District: Aurgazinsky District

Population (2010)
  - Total: 381
- Time zone: UTC+5:00

Stepanovka (Russian: Степановка) is a rural locality (a selo) and the administrative centre of Stepanovsky Selsoviet, Aurgazinsky District, Bashkortostan, Russia. The population was 381 as of 2010. There are 5 streets.

== Geography ==
Stepanovka is located 18 km west of Tolbazy (the district's administrative centre) by road. Dobrovolnoye is the nearest rural locality.
