= Bryansky =

Bryansky (masculine), Bryanskaya (feminine), or Bryanskoye (neuter) may refer to:

- Bryansky District, a district of Bryansk Oblast, Russia
- Bryansky (rural locality) (Bryanskaya, Bryanskoye), name of several rural localities in Russia

== See also ==
- Rita Briansky (1925–2025), Polish-born Canadian painter and printmaker
- Bryansk
- Bryansk Oblast (Bryanskaya oblast), a federal subject of Russia
