= Dobrovolnoye =

Dobrovolnoye Добровольное
- Village
- Location within Bashkortostan Location within Russia
- Coordinates: 53°59′N 55°39′E
- Country: Russia
- Region: Bashkortostan
- District: Aurgazinsky District

Population (2010)
  - Total: 64
- Time zone: UTC+5:00

Dobrovolnoye (Russian: Добровольное) is a rural locality (a village) in Stepanovsky Selsoviet, Aurgazinsky District, Bashkortostan, Russia. The population was 64 as of 2010. There is 1 street.

== Geography ==
Dobrovolnoye is located 19 km west of Tolbazy (the district's administrative centre) by road. Stepanovka is the nearest rural locality.
