= Belogorsky, Uryupinsky District, Volgograd Oblast =

Belogorsky Белогорский
- Khutor
- Location within Volgograd Oblast Location within Russia
- Coordinates: 50°38′N 41°53′E
- Country: Russia
- Region: Volgograd Oblast
- District: Uryupinsky District
- Time zone: UTC+4:00

Belogorsky (Russian: Белогорский) is a rural locality (a khutor) in Rossoshinskoye Rural Settlement, Uryupinsky District, Volgograd Oblast, Russia. The population was 160 as of 2010. There are 4 streets.

== Geography ==
Belogorsky is located in steppe, on the right bank of the Khopyor River, 43 km southwest of Uryupinsk (the district's administrative centre) by road. Tepikinskaya is the nearest rural locality.
