= Belogorsky (village), Bishkainsky Selsoviet, Aurgazinsky District, Republic of Bashkortostan =

Belogorsky Белогорский
- Village
- Location within Bashkortostan Location within Russia
- Coordinates: 53°59′N 56°09′E
- Country: Russia
- Region: Bashkortostan
- District: Aurgazinsky District
- Time zone: UTC+5:00

Belogorsky (Russian: Белогорский) is a rural locality (a village) in Bishkainsky Selsoviet, Aurgazinsky District, Bashkortostan, Russia. The population was 15 as of 2010. There is 1 street.

== Geography ==
Belogorsky is located 23 km east of Tolbazy (the district's administrative centre) by road. Bishkain is the nearest rural locality.
