= Uvarovsky, Volgograd Oblast =

Uvarovsky Уваровский
- Khutor
- Location within Volgograd Oblast Location within Russia
- Coordinates: 51°10′10″N 42°00′31″E
- Country: Russia
- Region: Volgograd Oblast
- District: Uryupinsky District
- Time zone: UTC+4:00

Uvarovsky (Russian: Уваровский) is a rural locality (a khutor) in Khopyoropionerskoye Rural Settlement, Uryupinsky District, Volgograd Oblast, Russia. The population was 122 in 2010. There are two streets.

== Geography ==
Uvarovsky is located in steppe, 66 kilometres (41 mi) north of Uryupinsk (the district's administrative centre) by road. Kriushinsky is the nearest rural locality.
