= Glinkovsky (rural locality) =

Glinkovsky Глинковский
- Khutor
- Location within Volgograd Oblast Location within Russia
- Coordinates: 51°06′N 41°50′E
- Country: Russia
- Region: Volgograd Oblast
- District: Uryupinsky District
- Time zone: UTC+4:00

Glinkovsky (Russian: Глинковский) is a rural locality (a khutor) in Saltynskoye Rural Settlement, Uryupinsky District, Volgograd Oblast, Russia. The population was 30 as of 2010. There are 2 streets.

== Geography ==
Glinkovsky is located in forest steppe, 46 km northwest of Uryupinsk (the district's administrative centre) by road. Pervomaysky is the nearest rural locality.
