= Uvarovsky =

Uvarovsky (masculine), Uvarovskaya (feminine), or Uvarovskoye (neuter) may refer to:

- Uvarovsky District, a district of Tambov Oblast, Russia
- Uvarovsky (rural locality) (Uvarovskaya, Uvarovskoye), several rural localities in Russia
