= Glinkovsky =

Glinkovsky (masculine), Glinkovskaya (feminine), or Glinkovskoye (neuter) may refer to:

- Glinkovsky District, a district of Smolensk Oblast
- Glinkovsky (rural locality), a rural locality (a khutor) in Volgograd Oblast, Russia
