= Tashlykul, Aurgazinsky District, Republic of Bashkortostan =

Tashlykul Ташлыкуль
- Village
- Location within Bashkortostan Location within Russia
- Coordinates: 53°57′N 55°57′E
- Country: Russia
- Region: Bashkortostan
- District: Aurgazinsky District
- Time zone: UTC+5:00

Tashlykul (Russian: Ташлыкуль; Bashkir: Ташлыкүл, Taşlıkül; Chuvash: Ташлăкӳл, Taşlăkül) is a rural locality (a village) in Kebyachevsky Selsoviet, Aurgazinsky District, Bashkortostan, Russia. The population was 250 as of 2010. There are 2 streets.

== Geography ==
Tashlykul is located 11 km southeast of Tolbazy (the district's administrative centre) by road. Utarkul is the nearest rural locality.
