= Usmanovo =

Usmanovo Усманово
- Village
- Location within Bashkortostan Location within Russia
- Coordinates: 53°55′N 55°44′E
- Country: Russia
- Region: Bashkortostan
- District: Aurgazinsky District
- Time zone: UTC+5:00

Usmanovo (Russian: Усманово; Bashkir: Уҫман, Uśman) is a rural locality (a village) in Tashtamaksky Selsoviet, Aurgazinsky District, Bashkortostan, Russia. The population was 165 as of 2010.

== Geography ==
It is located 15 km from Tolbazy and 4 km from Tashtamak.
