= Belogorsky, Kumylzhensky District, Volgograd Oblast =

Belogorsky Белогорский
- Khutor
- Location within Volgograd Oblast Location within Russia
- Coordinates: 49°54′N 41°55′E
- Country: Russia
- Region: Volgograd Oblast
- District: Kumylzhensky District
- Time zone: UTC+4:00

Belogorsky (Russian: Белогорский) is a rural locality (a khutor) and the administrative center of Belogorskoye Rural Settlement, Kumylzhensky District, Volgograd Oblast, Russia. The population was 713 as of 2010. There are 7 streets.

== Geography ==
Belogorsky is located on Khopyorsko-Buzulukskaya Plain, 58 km west of Kumylzhenskaya (the district's administrative centre) by road. Lyubishensky is the nearest rural locality.
