= Belogorsky, Arkhangelsk Oblast =

Belogorsky Белогорский
- Settlement
- Location within Arkhangelsk Oblast Location within Russia
- Coordinates: 64°11′N 42°20′E
- Country: Russia
- Region: Arkhangelsk Oblast
- District: Kholmogorsky District

Population
  - Total: 648
- Time zone: UTC+3:00

Belogorsky (Russian: Белогорский) is a rural locality (a settlement) and the administrative center of Belogorskoye Rural Settlement of Kholmogorsky District, Arkhangelsk Oblast, Russia. The population was 648 as of 2010. The locality has 3 streets.

== Geography ==
Belogorsky is located on the Pinega River, 50 km east of Kholmogory (the district's administrative centre) by road. Palenga is the nearest rural locality.
