= Uryupinsk =

Town in Volgograd Oblast, Russia

Uryupinsk Урюпинск
- Town
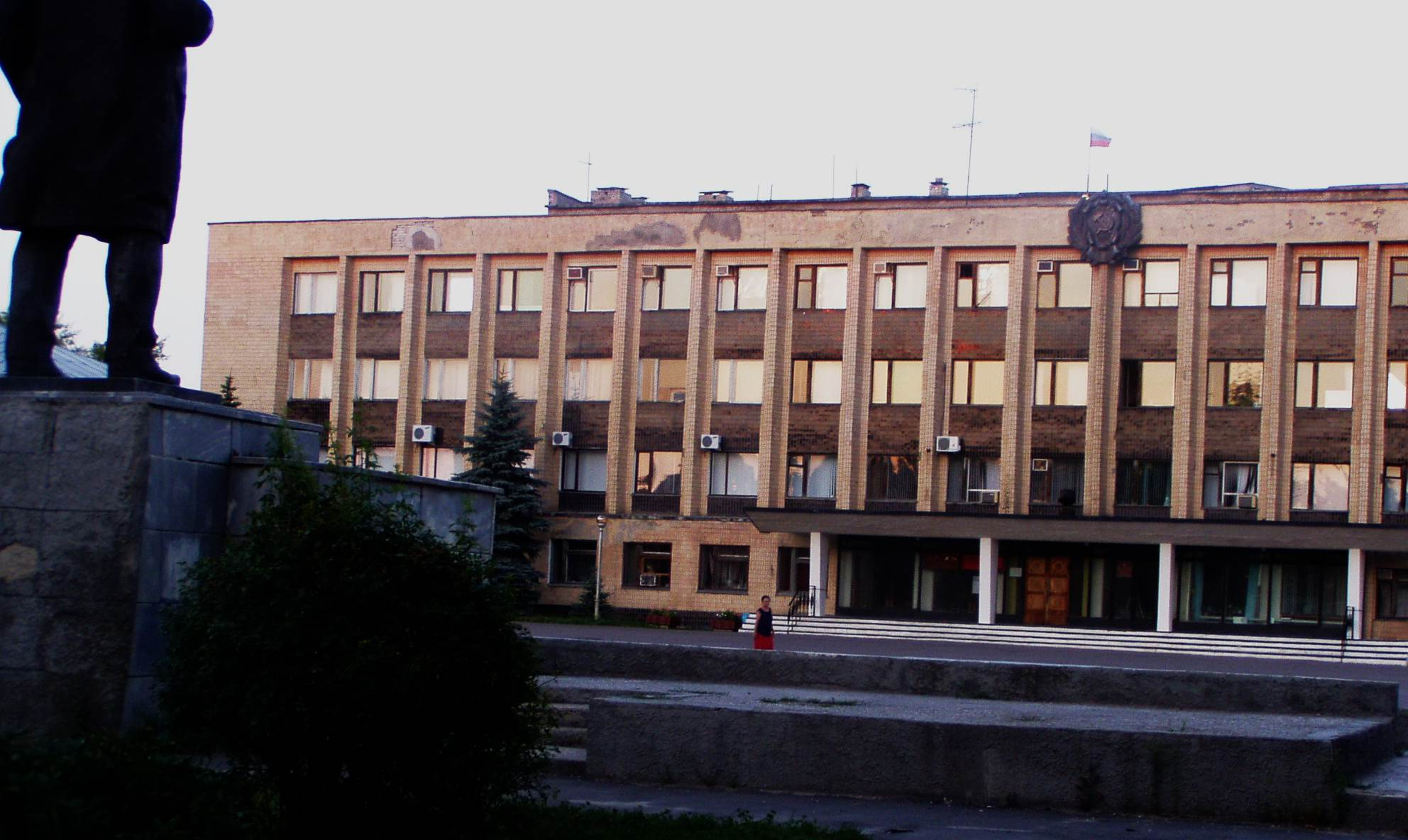
- Government building in Uryupinsk

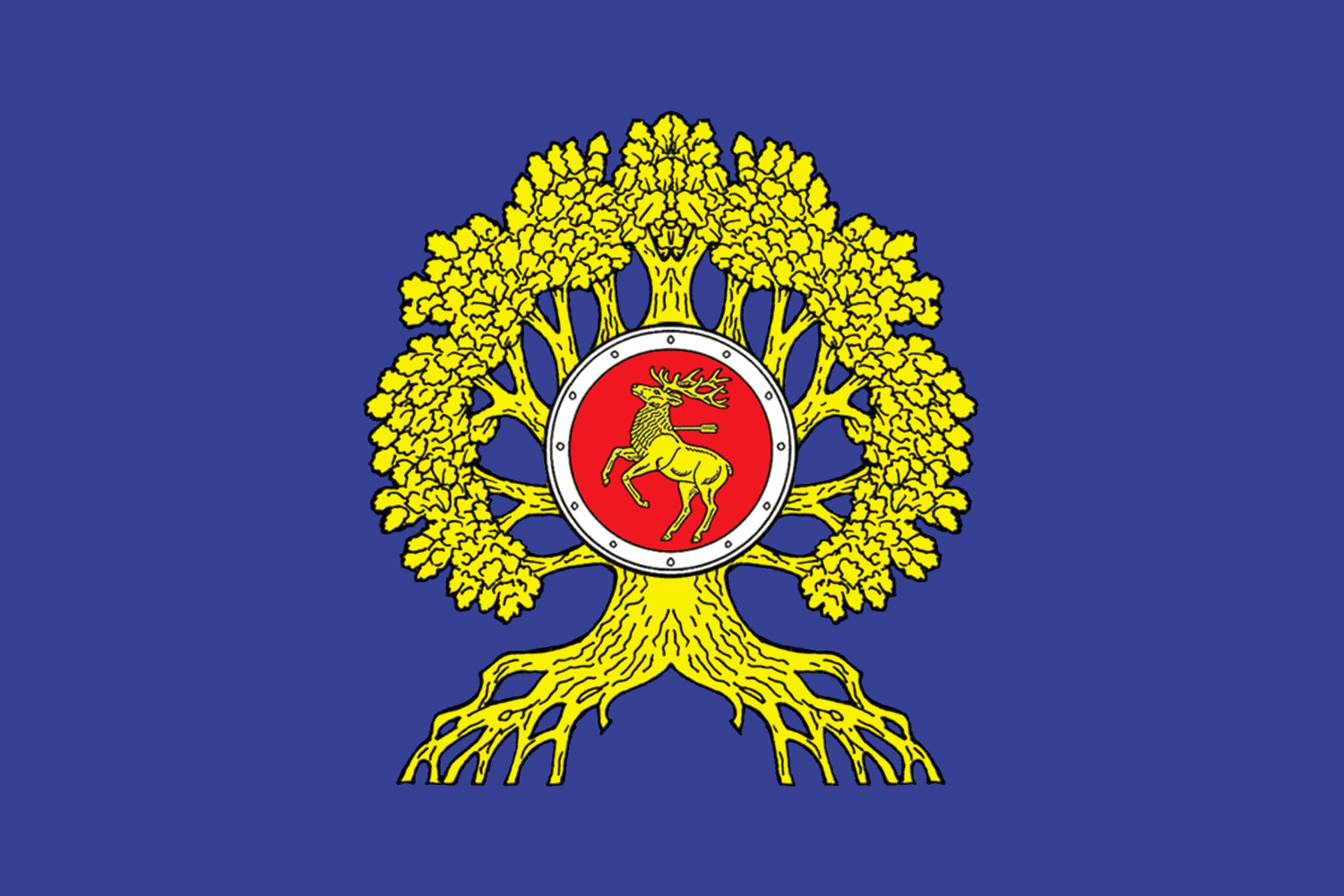
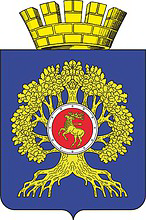
- Flag Coat of arms
- Interactive map of Uryupinsk
- Location of Uryupinsk Uryupinsk (Volgograd Oblast)
- Coordinates: 50°48′N 42°01′E
- Country: Russia
- Federal subject: Volgograd Oblast
- Founded: late 14th–early 15th century
- Town status since: 1929
- Elevation: 80 m (260 ft)

Population (2010 Census)
  - Total: 41,590
  - Estimate (2025): 34,783 (−16.4%)

Administrative status
  - Subordinated to: town of oblast significance of Uryupinsk
  - Capital of: Uryupinsky District, town of oblast significance of Uryupinsk

Municipal status
  - Urban okrug: Uryupinsk Urban Okrug
  - Capital of: Uryupinsk Urban Okrug, Uryupinsky Municipal District
- Time zone: UTC+3 (MSK)
- Postal code: 403120
- Dialing code: +7 84442
- OKTMO ID: 18725000001

Uryupinsk (Russian: Урю́пинск) is a town in Volgograd Oblast, Russia, located 340 kilometers (210 mi) northwest of Volgograd on the Khopyor River. Population: 41,590 (2010 census); 41,960 (2002 census); 42,954 (1989 Soviet census).

== Etymology ==
There are two theories of the historical background for the town's name. One is that it is from name of a Tartar prince Uryup, who got bogged down in a swamp near this location, during a fight with Yermak and got captured. Another is that it is from either the family name Uryupin or the word "урюпа" (uryupa). According to the 1866 Explanatory Dictionary of the Living Great Russian Language by Vladimir Dal, this archaic word means untidy person, which probably in this context characterizes not a person, but the swampy area.

== History ==
Founded in the late 14th–early 15th century as Uryupin, it was a border outpost of the Principality of Ryazan, populated by Don Cossacks. Since 1857, it is the stanitsa Uryupinskaya and home of Pokrovskaya Fair, a center for trade on the southeastern side of the East European Plain. It was renamed Uryupinsk and granted town status in 1929.

According to the alphabetical list of settlements of the Donskoy Army region in 1915: 5,782 men and 6,316 women lived in the village, the land allotment of the village amounted to 25,354 tithes of land, the office of the district ataman, the district zemsky council, the district leader of the nobility, the postal and telegraph office, a real school, a women's gymnasium, a city school, a women's 4th grade a school, two two-class schools, two parish schools, a military craft school, a district hospital, a committee of the Russian Red Cross Society, a fire brigade, a commercial and industrial mutual credit society, the Ust-Medveditsky District Court, investigators of three sites, a notary, a prison and other officials and institutions

In 1921, the village was incorporated into the Tsaritsyn province. Since 1928, it has been the administrative center of the Uryupinsky district of the Khopersky district (abolished in 1930) The Lower Volga Region

It is assumed that it is listed in the historical List of Ruthenian Cities Far and Near under the name "Uryupesk" (Урюпеск).

== Administrative and municipal status ==
Within the framework of administrative divisions, Uryupinsk serves as the administrative center of Uryupinsky District, even though it is not a part of it. As an administrative division, it is incorporated separately as the "town of oblast significance of Uryupinsk"—an administrative unit with the status equal to that of the districts. As a municipal division, the town of oblast significance of Uryupinsk is incorporated as Uryupinsk Urban Okrug.

== Climate ==
Climate data for Uryupinsk (1991–2020, extremes 1881–present)
Month	Jan	Feb	Mar	Apr	May	Jun	Jul	Aug	Sep	Oct	Nov	Dec	Year
Record high °C (°F)	11.1 (52.0)	12.2 (54.0)	22.4 (72.3)	30.0 (86.0)	36.2 (97.2)	39.5 (103.1)	42.1 (107.8)	41.1 (106.0)	37.0 (98.6)	29.1 (84.4)	19.0 (66.2)	12.3 (54.1)	42.1 (107.8)
Mean daily maximum °C (°F)	−3.6 (25.5)	−2.9 (26.8)	3.6 (38.5)	15.2 (59.4)	22.7 (72.9)	26.5 (79.7)	28.7 (83.7)	28.1 (82.6)	21.3 (70.3)	12.6 (54.7)	3.4 (38.1)	−2.0 (28.4)	12.8 (55.1)
Daily mean °C (°F)	−6.6 (20.1)	−6.4 (20.5)	−0.8 (30.6)	8.8 (47.8)	15.9 (60.6)	19.9 (67.8)	21.9 (71.4)	20.8 (69.4)	14.5 (58.1)	7.6 (45.7)	0.2 (32.4)	−4.8 (23.4)	7.6 (45.7)
Mean daily minimum °C (°F)	−9.4 (15.1)	−9.6 (14.7)	−4.3 (24.3)	3.2 (37.8)	9.2 (48.6)	13.3 (55.9)	15.2 (59.4)	13.7 (56.7)	8.6 (47.5)	3.5 (38.3)	−2.4 (27.7)	−7.5 (18.5)	2.8 (37.0)
Record low °C (°F)	−37.7 (−35.9)	−40.5 (−40.9)	−33.5 (−28.3)	−16.8 (1.8)	−5.0 (23.0)	0.5 (32.9)	4.7 (40.5)	1.8 (35.2)	−6.2 (20.8)	−15.1 (4.8)	−26.2 (−15.2)	−38.4 (−37.1)	−40.5 (−40.9)
Average precipitation mm (inches)	30 (1.2)	25 (1.0)	25 (1.0)	27 (1.1)	38 (1.5)	52 (2.0)	51 (2.0)	33 (1.3)	43 (1.7)	34 (1.3)	32 (1.3)	32 (1.3)	422 (16.7)
Source: Pogoda.ru.net

== Economy ==
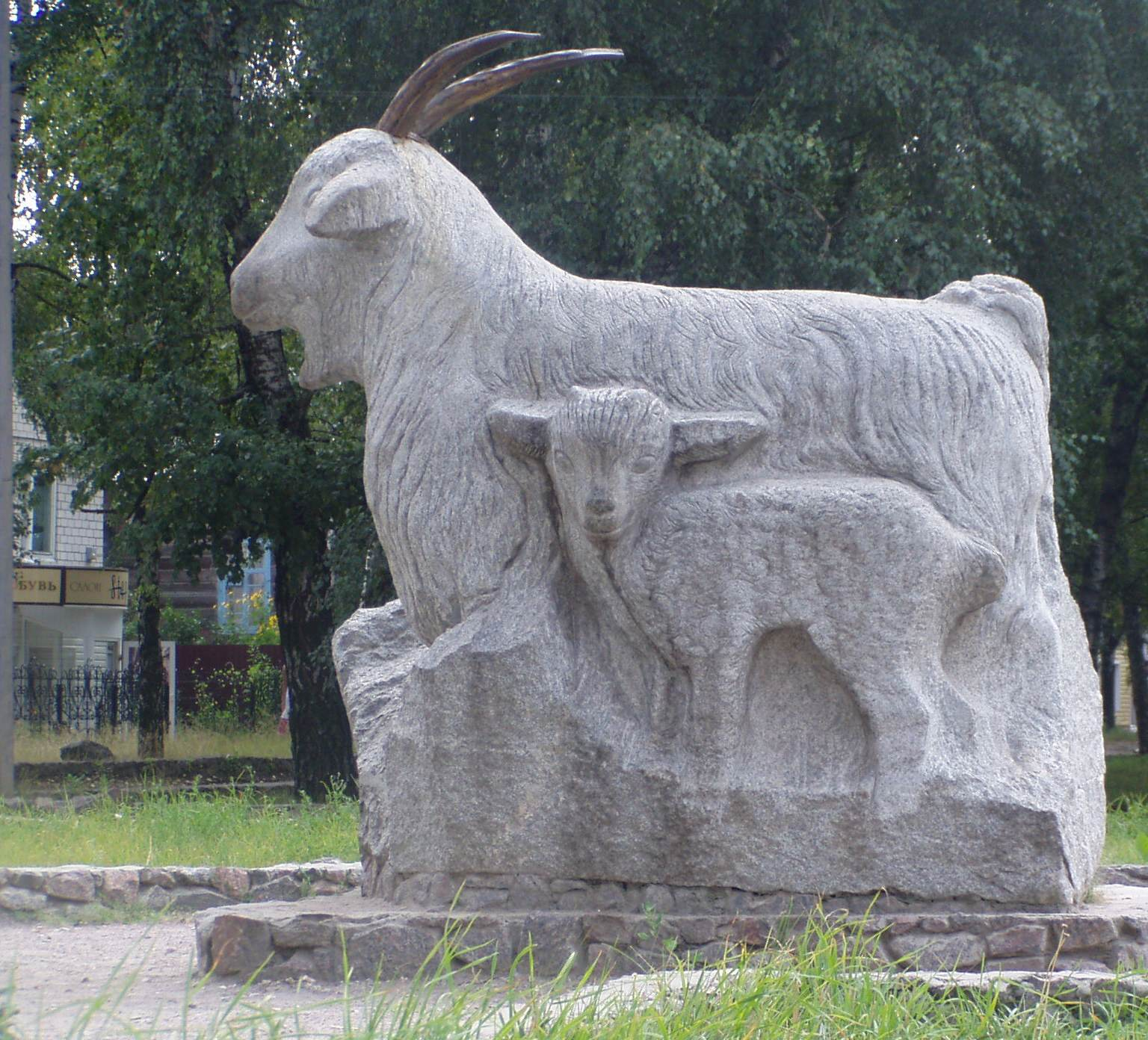
A monument in Uryupinsk

Uryupinsk is an industrial center with heavy industries such as agricultural machinery (harvesting machines) and loading equipment (a large crane-making plant is located here). The city also contains factories of light industry production (such as knitted fabric, shoe fabric, and furniture fabric), paper production plant, and a packing plant.

Another major industry involving the outlying areas of the town is goat farming and goat leather production. Because of its mild southern climate, the region is a good area for agriculture, and there are many agricultural processing factories in the region, specializing mainly in beef, oil and butter production.

== Notable people ==
- Yevgeny Dzhugashvili, grandson of Joseph Stalin
- Evgeny Maleev, Soviet paleontologist who discovered Therizinosaurus

== In popular culture ==
The name "Uryupinsk" is known to many Russian people as a placeholder name for "backwater town". This usage became widespread after the popular Soviet film Destiny of a Man. The film was based on a short story by Mikhail Sholokhov, "Fate of a Man", and in its final part Uryupinsk was the place of the action, shown as an inconspicuous provincial town. However the town got a widespread fame due to the following students' joke, to the extent that a monument to the joke was unveiled there:

At a history exam a professor asks: "Tell me about the Spartacus uprising." - Not a word from the student. - "Well, what do you know about the October Revolution?" - Same response. - "Now, do you know the name Lenin at least?" - "No" - The professor is speechless... "Where are you from, such a wonderful piece?" - "From Uryupinsk."... Later the professor recounts the story to the colleagues and muses "Oh, if only I could drop everything and leave to Uryupinsk!"
