= Uryupinsky District =

Uryupinsky District Урюпинский район (Russian)
- District
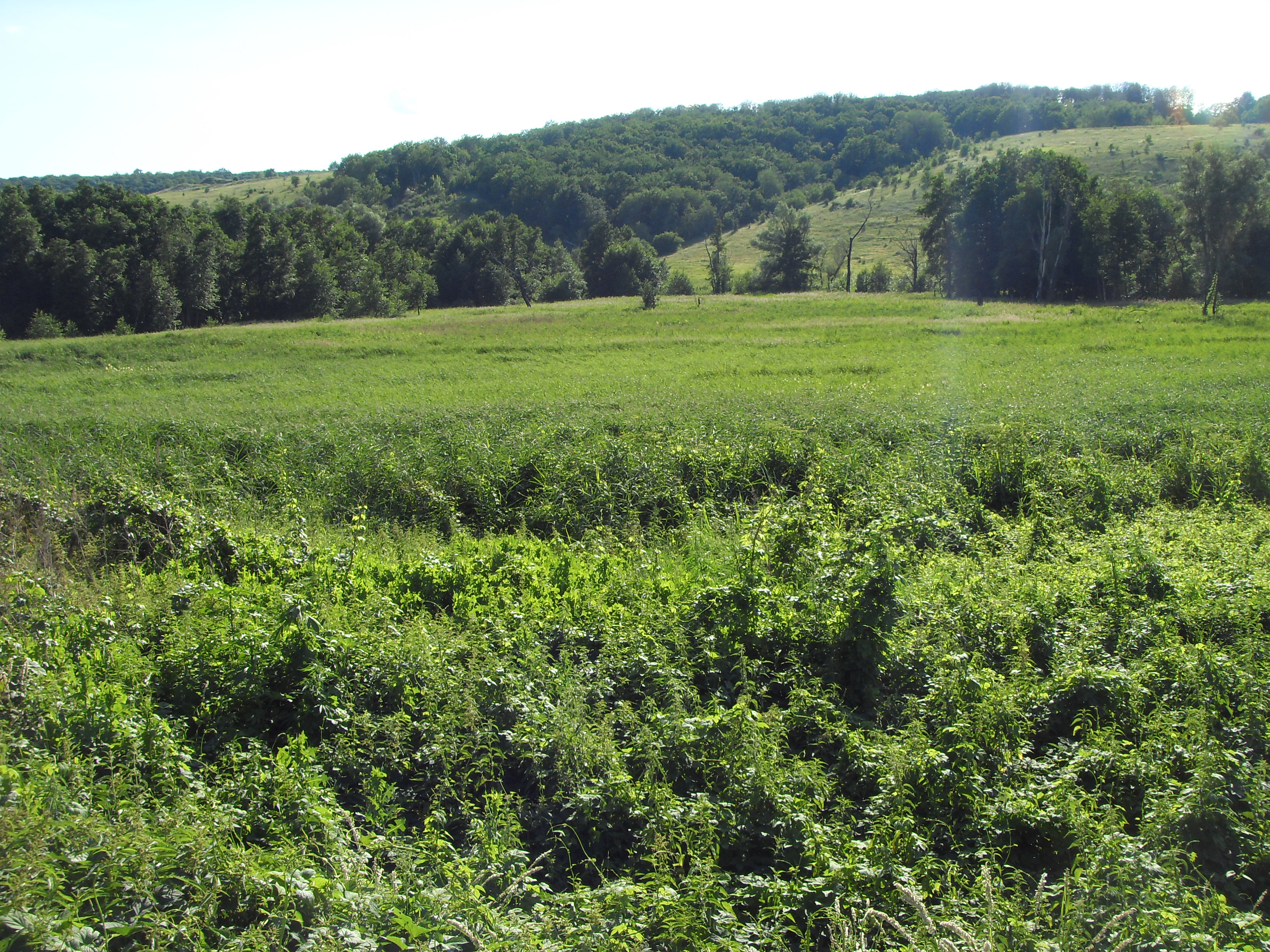
- Landscape in Uryupinsky District

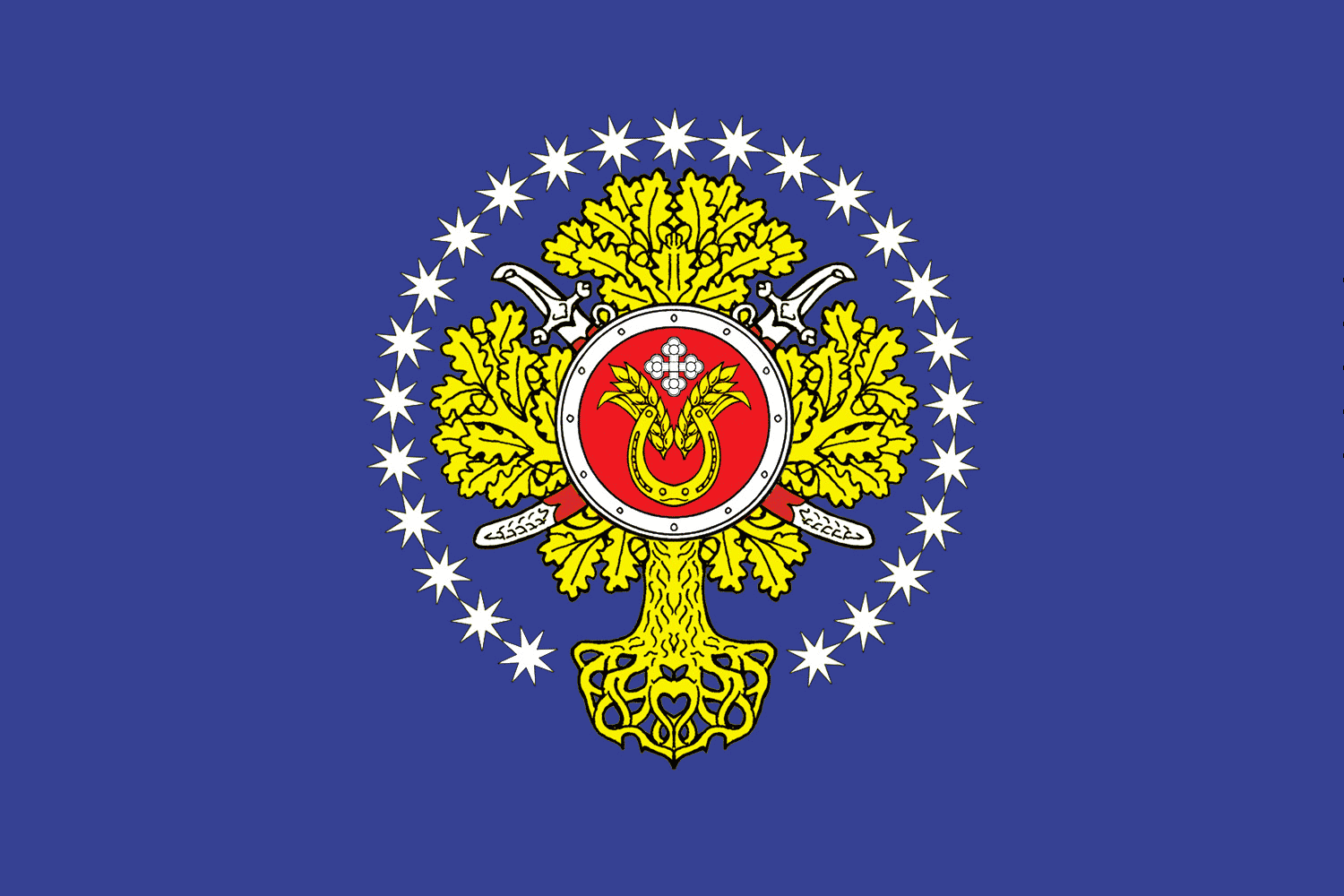
- Flag Coat of arms
- Location of Uryupinsky District in Volgograd Oblast
- Coordinates: 50°48′N 42°01′E
- Country: Russia
- Federal subject: Volgograd Oblast
- Established: 23 June 1928
- Administrative center: Uryupinsk

Area
  - Total: 3,460 km^{2} (1,340 sq mi)

Population (2010 Census)
  - Total: 28,775
  - Density: 8.32/km^{2} (21.5/sq mi)
  - Urban: 0%
  - Rural: 100%

Administrative structure
  - Administrative divisions: 23 Selsoviets
  - Inhabited localities: 97 rural localities

Municipal structure
  - Municipally incorporated as: Uryupinsky Municipal District
  - Municipal divisions: 0 urban settlements, 25 rural settlements
- Time zone: UTC+3 (MSK)
- OKTMO ID: 18654000
- Website: https://www.umr34.ru/

Uryupinsky District (Russian: Урю́пинский райо́н) is an administrative district (raion), one of the thirty-three in Volgograd Oblast, Russia. As a municipal division, it is incorporated as Uryupinsky Municipal District. It is located in the northwest of the oblast. The area of the district is 3,460 square kilometers (1,340 sq mi). Its administrative center is the town of Uryupinsk (which is not administratively a part of the district). Population: 28,775 (2010 census); 30,615 (2002 Census); 33,266 (1989 Soviet census).

== Administrative and municipal status ==
Within the framework of administrative divisions, Uryupinsky District is one of the thirty-three in the oblast. The town of Uryupinsk serves as its administrative center, despite being incorporated separately as a town of oblast significance—an administrative unit with the status equal to that of the districts.

As a municipal division, the district is incorporated as Uryupinsky Municipal District. The town of oblast significance of Uryupinsk is incorporated separately from the district as Uryupinsk Urban Okrug.
