= Tolbazy, Aurgazinsky District, Republic of Bashkortostan =

Rural locality in the Republic of Bashkortostan, Russia

Tolbazy Толбазы
- Selo

Other transcription(s)
  - Bashkir: Талбазы
- Interactive map of Tolbazy
- Location of Tolbazy Tolbazy (Bashkortostan)
- Coordinates: 54°00′50″N 55°53′32″E
- Country: Russia
- Federal subject: Bashkortostan
- Administrative district: Aurgazinsky District
- Selsoviet: Tolbazinsky Selsoviet
- Founded: 1747

Population (2010 Census)
  - Total: 10,114
  - Estimate (1 January 1934): 1,866 (−81.6%)

Administrative status
  - Capital of: Aurgazinsky District, Tolbazinsky Selsoviet

Municipal status
  - Municipal district: Aurgazinsky Municipal District
  - Rural settlement: Tolbazinsky Selsoviet Rural Settlement
  - Capital of: Aurgazinsky Municipal District, Tolbazinsky Selsoviet Rural Settlement
- Time zone: UTC+5 (MSK+2)
- Postal code: 453480
- OKTMO ID: 80605446101

Tolbazy (Russian: Толбазы, Bashkir: Талбазы, Talbazı) is a rural locality (a selo) and the administrative center of Aurgazinsky District of the Republic of Bashkortostan, Russia. Population: 10,114 (2010 census); 10,164 (2002 census); 9,096 (1989 Soviet census).
