= Aurgazinsky District =

Aurgazinsky District Аургазинский район (Russian)
- District

Other transcription(s)
  - Bashkir: Ауырғазы районы
  - Chuvash: Авăркас районӗ
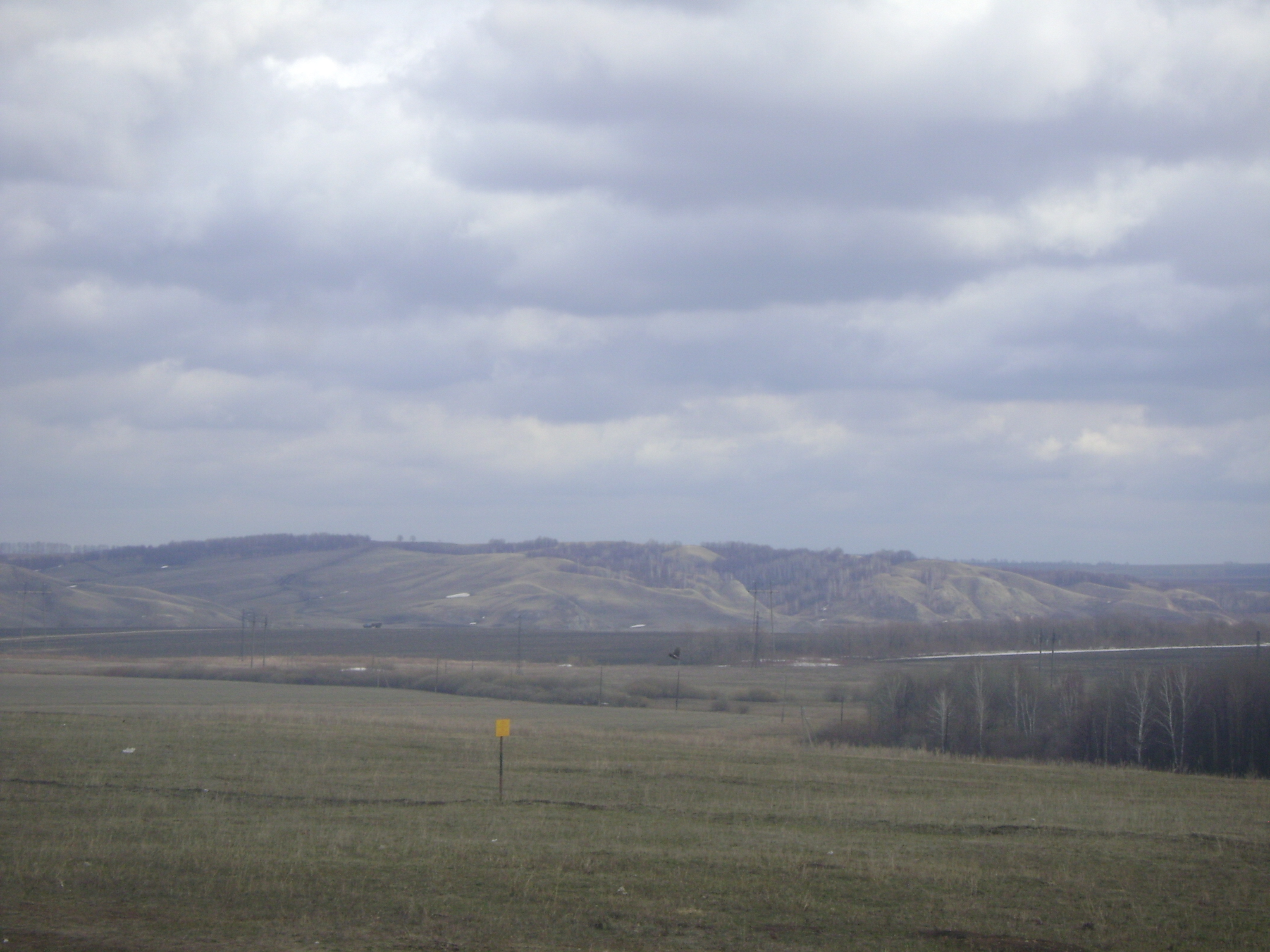
- Village Arslanovo, Aurgazinsky District

- Flag Coat of arms
- Location of Aurgazinsky District in the Republic of Bashkortostan
- Coordinates: 54°00′N 55°54′E
- Country: Russia
- Federal subject: Republic of Bashkortostan
- Established: August 20, 1930
- Administrative center: Tolbazy

Area
  - Total: 2,014 km^{2} (778 sq mi)

Population (2010 Census)
  - Total: 36,970
  - Density: 18.36/km^{2} (47.54/sq mi)
  - Urban: 0%
  - Rural: 100%

Administrative structure
  - Administrative divisions: 21 Selsoviets
  - Inhabited localities: 137 rural localities

Municipal structure
  - Municipally incorporated as: Aurgazinsky Municipal District
  - Municipal divisions: 0 urban settlements, 21 rural settlements
- Time zone: UTC+5 (MSK+2)
- OKTMO ID: 80605000
- Website: http://aurgazinsky.ru

Population of Aurgazinsky District
- 2010 Census: 36,970
- 2002 Census: 38,996
- 1989 Census: 39,069
- 1979 Census: 47,213

Aurgazinsky District (Russian: Аургази́нский райо́н; Bashkir: Ауырғазы районы, Awırğazı rayonı; Tatar: Авыргазы районы, Awırğazı rayonı; Chuvash: Авăркас районӗ, Avărkas rayonĕ) is an administrative and municipal district (raion), one of the fifty-four in the Republic of Bashkortostan, Russia. It is located in the center of the republic and borders Karmaskalinsky District in the north, Gafuriysky District in the east, Sterlitamaksky District in the south, and with Alsheyevsky and Davlekanovsky Districts in the west. The area of the district is 2,014 square kilometers (778 sq mi). Its administrative center is the rural locality (a selo) of Tolbazy. As of the 2010 Census, the total population of the district was 36,970, with the population of Tolbazy accounting for 27.4% of that number.

== Geography ==
The landscape of the district is characterized by ridges and undulating plains and has deposits of gypsum and limestone and oil fields (such as Buzovyazovskoye, Tolbazinskoye, Urshakskoye, and others). The climate is continental and moderately moist, with an average annual temperature of −16 °C (3 °F) in January and 19 °C (66 °F) in July. It has an average annual rainfall of 500 millimeters (20 in), with 350 millimeters (14 in) falling during summer. Oak, birch, linden and aspen forests occupy about 18% of the area and a total of 27.3% is wooded. Fauna is represented by steppe and forest species.

== History ==
The district was established on August 20, 1930.

== Administrative and municipal status ==
Within the framework of administrative divisions, Aurgazinsky District is one of the fifty-four in the Republic of Bashkortostan. The district is divided into 21 selsoviets, comprising 137 rural localities. As a municipal division, the district is incorporated as Aurgazinsky Municipal District. Its twenty-one selsoviets are incorporated as twenty-one rural settlements within the municipal district. The selo of Tolbazy serves as the administrative center of both the administrative and municipal district.
