= Filin, Danilovsky District, Volgograd Oblast =

Filin Филин
- Khutor
- Location within Volgograd Oblast Location within Russia
- Coordinates: 50°21′N 44°16′E
- Country: Russia
- Region: Volgograd Oblast
- District: Danilovsky District
- Time zone: UTC+4:00

Filin (Russian: Филин) is a rural locality (a khutor) in Ostrovskoye Rural Settlement, Danilovsky District, Volgograd Oblast, Russia. The population was 63 as of 2010. There are 6 streets.

== Geography ==
Filin is located 28 km east of Danilovka (the district's administrative centre) by road. Krasny is the nearest rural locality.
