= Belye Prudy =

Belye Prudy Белые Пруды
- Settlement
- Location within Volgograd Oblast Location within Russia
- Coordinates: 50°34′N 44°02′E
- Country: Russia
- Region: Volgograd Oblast
- District: Danilovsky District
- Time zone: UTC+4:00

Belye Prudy (Russian: Белые Пруды) is a rural locality (a settlement) and the administrative center of Beloprudskoye Rural Settlement, Danilovsky District, Volgograd Oblast, Russia. The population was 551 as of 2010. There are 13 streets.

== Geography ==
Belye Prudy is located in steppe, 48 km north of Danilovka (the district's administrative centre) by road. Velichkin is the nearest rural locality.
