= Kamennochernovsky =

Kamennochernovsky Каменночерновский
- Khutor
- Location within Volgograd Oblast Location within Russia
- Coordinates: 50°24′N 44°13′E
- Country: Russia
- Region: Volgograd Oblast
- District: Danilovsky District
- Time zone: UTC+4:00

Kamennochernovsky (Russian: Каменночерновский) is a rural locality (a khutor) in Loboykovskoye Rural Settlement, Danilovsky District, Volgograd Oblast, Russia. The population was 128 as of 2010. There are 2 streets.

== Geography ==
Kamennochernovsky is located in steppe, on the left bank of the Chyornaya River, 23 km northeast of Danilovka (the district's administrative centre) by road. Loboykovo is the nearest rural locality.
