= Loboykovo =

Loboykovo Лобойково
- Selo
- Location within Volgograd Oblast Location within Russia
- Coordinates: 50°27′N 44°12′E
- Country: Russia
- Region: Volgograd Oblast
- District: Danilovsky District
- Time zone: UTC+4:00

Loboykovo (Russian: Лобойково) is a rural locality (a selo) and the administrative center of Loboykovskoye Rural Settlement, Danilovsky District, Volgograd Oblast, Russia. The population was 825 as of 2010. There are 19 streets.

== Geography ==
Loboykovo is located in steppe, on the Chyornaya River, 28 km northeast of Danilovka (the district's administrative centre) by road. Kamennochernovsky is the nearest rural locality.
