= Rogachi =

Rogachi Рогачи
- Khutor
- Location within Volgograd Oblast Location within Russia
- Coordinates: 50°10′N 44°08′E
- Country: Russia
- Region: Volgograd Oblast
- District: Danilovsky District
- Time zone: UTC+4:00

Rogachi (Russian: Рогачи) is a rural locality (a khutor) in Atamanovskoye Rural Settlement, Danilovsky District, Volgograd Oblast, Russia. The population was 123 as of 2010. There are 2 streets.

== Geography ==
Rogachi is located in steppe, on the right bank of the Beryozovka River, 49 km south of Danilovka (the district's administrative centre) by road. Atamanovka is the nearest rural locality.
