= Kuvshinov =

Kuvshinov Кувшинов
- Khutor
- Location within Volgograd Oblast Location within Russia
- Coordinates: 50°11′N 44°14′E
- Country: Russia
- Region: Volgograd Oblast
- District: Danilovsky District
- Time zone: UTC+4:00

Kuvshinov (Russian: Кувшинов) is a rural locality (a khutor) in Atamanovskoye Rural Settlement, Danilovsky District, Volgograd Oblast, Russia. The population was 131 as of 2010. There are 3 streets.

== Geography ==
Kuvshinov is located in steppe, on the Beryozovka River, 55 km southeast of Danilovka (the district's administrative centre) by road. Rogachi is the nearest rural locality.
