= Kamenny, Danilovsky District, Volgograd Oblast =

Kamenny Каменный
- Khutor
- Location within Volgograd Oblast Location within Russia
- Coordinates: 50°22′N 44°20′E
- Country: Russia
- Region: Volgograd Oblast
- District: Danilovsky District
- Time zone: UTC+4:00

Kamenny (Russian: Каменный) is a rural locality (a khutor) in Ostrovskoye Rural Settlement, Danilovsky District, Volgograd Oblast, Russia. The population was 168 as of 2010. There are 13 streets.

== Geography ==
Kamenny is located in steppe, on the left bank of the Medveditsa River, 35 km east of Danilovka (the district's administrative centre) by road. Filin is the nearest rural locality.
