= Gonchary, Danilovsky District, Volgograd Oblast =

Gonchary Гончары
- Selo
- Location within Volgograd Oblast Location within Russia
- Coordinates: 50°27′N 43°57′E
- Country: Russia
- Region: Volgograd Oblast
- District: Danilovsky District
- Time zone: UTC+4:00

Gonchary (Russian: Гончары) is a rural locality (a khutor) in Miusovskoye Rural Settlement, Danilovsky District, Volgograd Oblast, Russia. The population was 146 as of 2010. There are 5 streets.

== Geography ==
The village is located in steppe, 10 km from Miusovo, 18 km from Danilovka and 250 km from Volgograd.
