= Zaplavka =

Zaplavka Заплавка
- Selo
- Location within Volgograd Oblast Location within Russia
- Coordinates: 50°22′N 43°56′E
- Country: Russia
- Region: Volgograd Oblast
- District: Danilovsky District
- Time zone: UTC+4:00

Zaplavka (Russian: Заплавка) is a rural locality (a selo) in Plotnikovskoye Rural Settlement, Danilovsky District, Volgograd Oblast, Russia. The population was 181 as of 2010. There are 8 streets.

== Geography ==
Zaplavka is located in steppe, on the north-west bank of the Bobrovoye Lake, 26 km northwest of Danilovka (the district's administrative centre) by road. Bobry is the nearest rural locality.
