= Semibratovsky =

Semibratovsky Семибратовский
- Khutor
- Location within Volgograd Oblast Location within Russia
- Coordinates: 50°29′N 43°49′E
- Country: Russia
- Region: Volgograd Oblast
- District: Danilovsky District
- Time zone: UTC+4:00

Semibratovsky (Russian: Семибратовский) is a rural locality (a khutor) in Profsoyuzninskoye Rural Settlement, Danilovsky District, Volgograd Oblast, Russia. The population was 49 as of 2010.

== Geography ==
Semibratovsky is located in steppe, on the north-west bank of the Bobrovoye Lake, 18 km northwest of Danilovka (the district's administrative centre) by road. Profsoyuznik is the nearest rural locality.
