= Prydki =

Prydki Прыдки
- Khutor
- Location within Volgograd Oblast Location within Russia
- Coordinates: 50°26′N 44°20′E
- Country: Russia
- Region: Volgograd Oblast
- District: Danilovsky District
- Time zone: UTC+4:00

Prydki (Russian: Прыдки) is a rural locality (a khutor) in Orekhovskoye Rural Settlement, Danilovsky District, Volgograd Oblast, Russia. The population was 30 as of 2010. There are 3 streets.

== Geography ==
Prydki is located in steppe, on the left bank of the Medveditsa River, 34 km northeast of Danilovka (the district's administrative centre) by road. Orekhovo is the nearest rural locality.
