= Velichkin, Volgograd Oblast =

Velichkin Величкин
- Khutor
- Location within Volgograd Oblast Location within Russia
- Coordinates: 50°34′N 44°01′E
- Country: Russia
- Region: Volgograd Oblast
- District: Danilovsky District
- Time zone: UTC+4:00

Velichkin (Russian: Величкин) is a rural locality (a khutor) in Beloprudskoye Rural Settlement, Danilovsky District, Volgograd Oblast, Russia. The population was 184 as of 2010. There are 3 streets.

== Geography ==
Velichkin is located in steppe, 49 km north of Danilovka (the district's administrative centre) by road. Belye Prudy is the nearest rural locality.
