= Atamanovka, Volgograd Oblast =

Atamanovka Атамановка
- Khutor
- Location within Volgograd Oblast Location within Russia
- Coordinates: 50°10′N 44°04′E
- Country: Russia
- Region: Volgograd Oblast
- District: Danilovsky District
- Time zone: UTC+4:00

Atamanovka (Russian: Атамановка) is a rural locality (a khutor) and the administrative center of Atamanovskoye Rural Settlement, Danilovsky District, Volgograd Oblast, Russia. The population was 601 as of 2010. There are 7 streets.

== Geography ==
Atamanovka is located in steppe, on the left bank of the Beryozovka River, 42 km south of Danilovka (the district's administrative centre) by road. Rogachi is the nearest rural locality.
