= Gryaznukha, Danilovsky District, Volgograd Oblast =

Gryaznukha Грязнуха
- Selo
- Location within Volgograd Oblast Location within Russia
- Coordinates: 50°42′N 44°02′E
- Country: Russia
- Region: Volgograd Oblast
- District: Danilovsky District
- Time zone: UTC+4:00

Gryaznukha (Russian: Грязнуха) is a rural locality (a selo) in Beloprudskoye Rural Settlement, Danilovsky District, Volgograd Oblast, Russia. The population was 161 as of 2010. There are 3 streets.

== Geography ==
Gryaznukha is located in steppe, on the left bank of the Kraishevka River, 63 km north of Danilovka (the district's administrative centre) by road. Kraishevo is the nearest rural locality.
