= Zapolyansky =

Zapolyansky Заполянский
- Khutor
- Location within Volgograd Oblast Location within Russia
- Coordinates: 50°13′N 43°47′E
- Country: Russia
- Region: Volgograd Oblast
- District: Danilovsky District
- Time zone: UTC+4:00

Zapolyansky (Russian: Заполянский) is a rural locality (a khutor) in Sergiyevskoye Rural Settlement, Danilovsky District, Volgograd Oblast, Russia. The population was 170 as of 2010. There are 9 streets.

== Geography ==
Zapolyansky is located on the left bank of the Medveditsa River, 41 km southwest of Danilovka (the district's administrative centre) by road. Sergiyevskaya is the nearest rural locality.
