= Lovyagin =

Lovyagin Ловягин
- Khutor
- Location within Volgograd Oblast Location within Russia
- Coordinates: 50°18′N 44°02′E
- Country: Russia
- Region: Volgograd Oblast
- District: Danilovsky District
- Time zone: UTC+4:00

Lovyagin (Russian: Ловягин) is a rural locality (a khutor) in Beryozovskoye Rural Settlement, Danilovsky District, Volgograd Oblast, Russia. The population was 201 as of 2010.

== Geography ==
Lovyagin is located in forest steppe, on the left bank of the Medveditsa River, 23 km north of Danilovka (the district's administrative centre) by road. Bobry is the nearest rural locality.
