= Bobry, Volgograd Oblast =

Bobry Бобры
- Khutor
- Location within Volgograd Oblast Location within Russia
- Coordinates: 50°19′N 44°00′E
- Country: Russia
- Region: Volgograd Oblast
- District: Danilovsky District
- Time zone: UTC+4:00

Bobry (Russian: Бобры) is a rural locality (a khutor) in Plotnikovskoye Rural Settlement, Danilovsky District, Volgograd Oblast, Russia. The population was 226 as of 2010. There are 8 streets.

== Geography ==
Bobry is located in steppe, on the northwest bank of the Bobrovoye Lake, 21 km west of Danilovka (the district's administrative centre) by road. Lovyagin is the nearest rural locality.
