= Petrushi, Volgograd Oblast =

Petrushi Петруши
- Khutor
- Location within Volgograd Oblast Location within Russia
- Coordinates: 50°11′N 44°02′E
- Country: Russia
- Region: Volgograd Oblast
- District: Danilovsky District
- Time zone: UTC+4:00

Petrushi (Russian: Петруши) is a rural locality (a khutor) in Atamanovskoye Rural Settlement, Danilovsky District, Volgograd Oblast, Russia. The population was 147 as of 2010. There are 2 streets.

== Geography ==
Petrushi is located in steppe, on the Beryozovka River, 39 km south of Danilovka (the district's administrative centre) by road. Atamanovka is the nearest rural locality.
