= Profsoyuznik =

Profsoyuznik Профсоюзник
- Settlement
- Location within Volgograd Oblast Location within Russia
- Coordinates: 50°29′N 43°49′E
- Country: Russia
- Region: Volgograd Oblast
- District: Danilovsky District
- Time zone: UTC+4:00

Profsoyuznik (Russian: Профсоюзник) is a rural locality (a settlement) and the administrative center of Profsoyuzninskoye Rural Settlement, Danilovsky District, Volgograd Oblast, Russia. The population was 490 as of 2010. There are 16 streets.

== Geography ==
Profsoyuznik is located in steppe, 9.4 km from Profsoyuznik, 18 km northwest of Danilovka (the district's administrative centre) by road. Semibratovsky is the nearest rural locality.
