= Dorozhkin =

Dorozhkin Дорожкин
- Khutor
- Location within Volgograd Oblast Location within Russia
- Coordinates: 50°14′N 44°21′E
- Country: Russia
- Region: Volgograd Oblast
- District: Danilovsky District
- Time zone: UTC+4:00

Dorozhkin (Russian: Дорожкин) is a rural locality (a khutor) in Krasninskoye Rural Settlement, Danilovsky District, Volgograd Oblast, Russia. The population was 11 as of 2010.

== Geography ==
Dorozhkin is located in steppe, 37 km southeast of Danilovka (the district's administrative centre) by road. Popki is the nearest rural locality.
