= Plotnikov 1-y =

Plotnikov 1-y Плотников 1-й
- Khutor
- Location within Volgograd Oblast Location within Russia
- Coordinates: 50°17′N 43°57′E
- Country: Russia
- Region: Volgograd Oblast
- District: Danilovsky District
- Time zone: UTC+4:00

Plotnikov 1-y (Russian: Плотников 1-й) is a rural locality (a khutor) and the administrative center of Plotnikovskoye Rural Settlement, Danilovsky District, Volgograd Oblast, Russia. The population was 809 as of 2010. There are 19 streets.

== Geography ==
Plotnikov 1-y is located in steppe, 2.7 km from the right bank of the Medveditsa River, 26 km southwest of Danilovka (the district's administrative centre) by road. Beryozovskaya is the nearest rural locality.
