= Orekhovo, Volgograd Oblast =

Orekhovo Орехово
- Selo
- Location within Volgograd Oblast Location within Russia
- Coordinates: 50°28′N 44°25′E
- Country: Russia
- Region: Volgograd Oblast
- District: Danilovsky District
- Time zone: UTC+4:00

Orekhovo (Russian: Орехово) is a rural locality (a selo) and the administrative center of Orekhovskoye Rural Settlement, Danilovsky District, Volgograd Oblast, Russia. The population was 602 as of 2010. There are 7 streets.

== Geography ==
Orekhovo is located in steppe, on the right bank of the Medveditsa River, 49 km northeast of Danilovka (the district's administrative centre) by road. Ostrovsky is the nearest rural locality.
