= Alexander Kibalnikov =

Soviet sculptor (1912–1987)

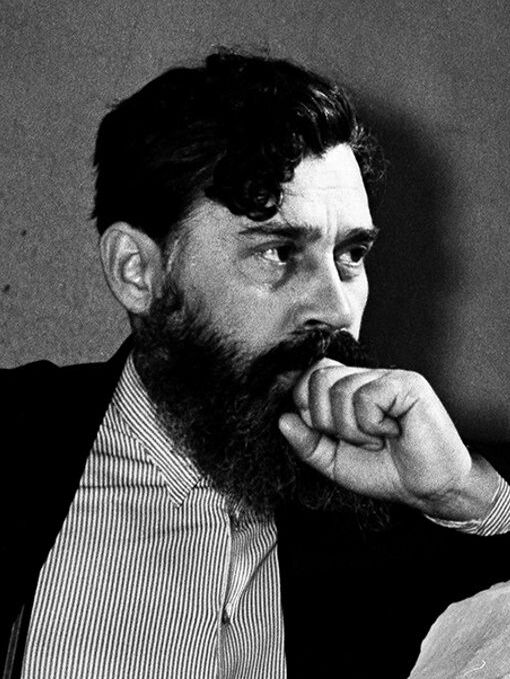
1951

Alexander Pavlovich Kibalnikov (Russian: Александр Павлович Кибальников; 22 August 1912 – 5 September 1987) was a Soviet sculptor.

== Early life ==
Alexander Kibalnikov was born in Orekhovo, a settlement in the Don Host Oblast (now Volgograd Oblast).

Kibalnikov was a small child when his gift for art became apparent. His parents did not support their son's interest, wanting him to receive a technical education. He ran away from home twice, without money or documents, and went to Saratov, where he tried to be admitted to the local art school.

He worked as a loader at the port and made many drawings, mostly portraits of his friends. Those pencil drawings received high grades at the entrance exams, and he was soon enrolled in the Department of Painting at the Saratov School of Art and Manufacturing. After graduation, Kibalnikov worked as a designer in the theater. However, the young artist was increasingly drawn to sculpture. He studied the works of major sculptors in the Saratov Art Gallery. The contest to create a sculpture of N. Chernyshevsky in Saratov, announced in 1940, offered Kibalnikov a chance to try his hand at sculpture. His work on sculpture of Chernyshevsky went well until it was interrupted by World War II.

== Career ==
In 1949, Kibalnikov's work on creating the image of Chernyshevsky was rewarded with the Stalin Prize for his bronze statue Nikolay Chernyshevsky (1948).

Kibalnikov took part in work on the monumental sculpture of Vladimir Mayakovsky in Moscow in the 1950s. Many famous masters tried to create the poet's image in sculpture, among them Matvey Manizer, Sergey Konenkov, Nikolai Tomsky, Yevgeny Vuchetich, Mikhail Anikushin, and Lev Kerbel. Kibalnikov's work received support due to its vibrant expressiveness, and won final approval. The bronze figure of the poet was unveiled in 1958; in 1959 the sculptor was awarded the Lenin Prize for this work.

Kibalnikov's work on the monument to Sergei Yesenin in Ryazan, unveiled in 1975, earned him the Repin Prize of the Russian Federation.

Kibalnikov created Tretyakov's sculptural portrait in marble in 1961. For more than 20 years he nurtured his dream to create a monument to Pavel Tretyakov. Kibalnikov fulfilled his task brilliantly. Both the size and color of the monument blended seamlessly into the complex of the Tretyakov Gallery. The monument opened in 1980.

== Sources ==
- Biography. Great Soviet encyclopedia (in Russian)
- A Master of Major Forms
