= Irgiz monasteries =

Complex of 18th-century Old Believer monasteries in Russia

Irgiz Monasteries were a complex of Old Believer monasteries built in the second half of the 18th century on the Bolshoy Irgiz River. From the late 18th to the first half of the 19th century, this area was the largest centre of Beglopopovstvo in the Russian Empire. As deacon Maxim Plyakin has noted, the Old Believers themselves called the Irgiz monasteries the "new Athos," in contrast to the Greek Mount Athos, which had "fallen into Nikonianism."

== History ==
Since the beginning of the 18th century, the environs of the Bolshoy and Maly Irgiz rivers were being settled by Old Believers, despite the constant threat of nomad raids. In 1727, Archbishop Sylvester (Kholmsky-Volynets) of Kazan reported to the Most Holy Synod that "along the Kirgiz (Irgiz) River, schismatics from the upstream towns and districts live, fleeing investigation, together with their wives and children, in great numbers." The authorities periodically searched for such settlers using military detachments, but, despite these persecutions, the area kept attracting new settlers. By the 1760s, the district was home to "more than a thousand Russian subjects." A number of slobodas arose.

Emperor Peter III, almost immediately after his accession, sent the Governing Senate a decree permitting all Old Believers who had earlier fled abroad to return to Russia unhindered, with the right to freedom of religion. G. R. Derzhavin suggested that this decree had appeared under the influence of a proposal submitted by Ivan Serebryakov, a peasant from Malykovka — one of the centres of Old Belief, now Volsk — for settling the sparsely populated lands along the Irgiz with Old Believer migrants from Poland. In December 1762, Catherine II confirmed the earlier decree, additionally promising the settlers exemption from taxes for six years and land allotments. The decree became the main source of colonisation of the Saratov Krai in the 18th century — in 1763 alone, about 20,000 people moved to the Irgiz from the Polish sloboda of Vetka, long an Old Believer centre. Along with the migrants from Europe, settlers from the interior of Russia also secretly made their way to the Irgiz, some of whom likewise managed to obtain land allotments.

In 1762, the Avraamiev Hermitage (later the Nizhne-Voskresensky Monastery) was founded, followed by the Isakiev Hermitage (later the Verkhne-Uspensky, then the Verkhne-Spaso-Preobrazhensky Monastery) and the Pakhomiev Hermitage (later the Sredne-Nikolsky Monastery). Initially, all these hermitages were named after their founders. Since the first settlers and founders of the Old Believer hermitages on the Irgiz were mostly natives of Vetka, women's hermitages began to be founded next to the men's ones, following Vetka's example. Five versts from the Isakiev Hermitage, the nun Margarita founded a women's hermitage, later known as the Pokrovsky Convent, while near the Pakhomiev Hermitage the Anfisin Hermitage (later the Sredne-Uspensky Convent) arose in 1783. Old Believers could also use the word "hermitage" (skit) to refer to a fairly large Old Believer monastery.

In 1797, Paul I sent his closest courtier — Privy Councillor Pavel Stepanovich Runich — to the Irgiz as an envoy. The grateful monks wrote the emperor a letter assuring him of their "loyal zeal and unshakeable devotion ... for all the days of [our] life." Soon after, a supreme decree exempted the Irgiz monks from military conscription. The land occupied by the monasteries was granted to them in perpetual ownership. After Paul's death, this order was confirmed by Alexander I as well. Thus the Irgiz monasteries came to hold a vast land grant of 12,534 desyatinas.

The favour shown by three successive Russian emperors could not but affect the prosperity of the monasteries. Spiritually, too, the Irgiz monasteries flourished. Council resolutions of 1779–1780 gave the Irgiz monasteries a virtual monopoly on the right to receive fugitive priests from the Russian Orthodox Church through chrismation, allowing them to retain their former rank. From then on, Beglopopovtsy Old Believer communities throughout Russia would accept for the performance of church rites only priests who had been chrismated ("reanointed") at the Irgiz monasteries. A distinct market even developed. The heads of Old Believer communities would buy priests on the Irgiz (the price of a "corrected" clergyman ranged from 500 to 2,000 roubles) either permanently or temporarily, after which they would trade on the priest's profession, moving him from one Old Believer settlement to another and earning good money from it. Almost every year new prohibitions were issued forbidding the monasteries to accept fugitive priests, and these were routinely ignored.

In 1805, a council held at the Verkhne-Spaso-Preobrazhensky Monastery recognised and confirmed the right to the title of "Orthodox," "catholic" church for the Irgiz monasteries alone. The Irgiz monasteries came to represent significant competition for the official Russian Orthodox Church. During this period, the Irgiz Old Believer monasteries achieved considerable prosperity: they owned 12½ thousand desyatinas of land and had several churches that attracted rich donations. In 1828, the Preobrazhensky Monastery had 87 cells; the Pokrovsky Convent, 100 households and 200 cells; the Nikolsky Monastery, 61 cells; the Uspensky Convent, 89 households and 145 cells; and the Nizhne-Voskresensky Monastery, 61 cells — besides many buildings for the sacristy, library, common refectory, the superiors, and so on. The number of monastics also grew, ranging from 100 to 700 across individual monasteries and reaching a total of 3,000 people by 1828. The characters in P. I. Melnikov's novel speak of the monasteries thus: "As Constantinople became the Second Rome after the fall of piety in old Rome, so after the fall of piety on the holy Mount Athos, a second Athos appeared on the Irgiz ... Truly it was a kingdom of monks ... They lived free of care and in abundance in all things ..."

During the reign of Alexander I, the state and church figures made several attempts to move against the Irgiz monasteries, but none of these were particularly persistent, and all ended in failure. Periodic searches were conducted at the monasteries, and new prohibitions were issued against accepting fugitive Orthodox priests. However, the monastic leadership ignored such demands, and the local authorities, mindful of the large number of Old Believers in the region — including some who held high office — were reluctant to quarrel with the monasteries' leadership; governors Belyakov and Panchulidzev repeatedly invited the superiors to consult with them.

With the accession of Nicholas I, the Irgiz began a period of decline. The pretext for persecution was the appearance on the Irgiz of two state criminals, whom the Old Believers refused to hand over. In 1826, bell-ringing was banned. At the end of 1827, the Irgiz "patriarch" Prokhor and the criminals were arrested. In 1828, the monasteries were required to convert to Edinoverie. Three men's Old Believer monasteries were converted to Edinoverie: the Nizhne-Voskresensky (1829), the Sredne-Nikolsky (1837), and the Verkhne-Spaso-Preobrazhensky (1841). Two women's Old Believer monasteries on the Irgiz were closed by the authorities and later dismantled: the Sredne-Uspensky (1837) and the Verkhne-Pokrovsky (1841).

However, the closure or conversion of the monasteries to Edinoverie did not reduce the number of Old Believers in the region — on the contrary, it increased. Whereas in 1826 the Ministry of Internal Affairs counted 41,761 Old Believers in Saratov Governorate, and the diocesan administration counted 14,602, by 1847 the Ministry counted 35,338 and the bishop 33,990 schismatics of the Beglopopovtsy persuasion alone. In 1854, the official Artemyev counted as many as 125,000 Old Believers. The monks' fate aroused sympathy among the population, who "considered them martyrs for the faith, kept in contact with them, and revered them." Of the monastics from all five Old Believer monasteries, no more than 20 people converted to Edinoverie.

Most of the Irgiz monks resettled in the district town of Khvalynsk and its surroundings — remote places, at a considerable distance from the provincial authorities — where the later-famous Cheremshan hermitages were founded. And although by the mid-19th century the Irgiz's history as an all-Russian centre of Old Belief had ended, according to the Old Believers themselves it was precisely the Irgiz monks — in particular Affony Kochuyev, secretary of the Verkhne-Spaso-Preobrazhensky Monastery, and Abbot Siluan (Nikiforov) — who, at the all-Old-Believer council of 1831, insisted on seeking a bishop for themselves from abroad. In 1846, Metropolitan Ambrose became that bishop, through whom the Belokrinitsy branch of Old Belief obtained a complete hierarchy, although many did not recognise this hierarchy because of the unilateral episcopal ordinations performed by Metropolitan Ambrose.

== See also ==
- Sergiy Yurshev
- Old Believers

== Bibliography ==
- Dobrotvorsky, I. M. (1857). "Исторические сведения об Иргизских мнимостарообрядческих монастырях до обращения их к единоверию" [Historical Information on the Irgiz Pseudo-Old-Believer Monasteries before Their Conversion to Edinoverie]. Pravoslavny Sobesednik (in Russian) (Book 2).
- Sokolov, N. S. (1888). Раскол в Саратовском крае. Опыт исследования по неизданным материалам [The Schism in the Saratov Krai: An Investigation Based on Unpublished Materials] (in Russian). Saratov: N. P. Shtertser & Co.
- Mordovtsev, D. L. (1889). "Последние годы иргизских раскольничьих общин" [The Last Years of the Irgiz Schismatic Communities]. Исторические Пропилеи. Том 1 [Historical Propylaea. Volume 1] (in Russian). St. Petersburg: N. A. Lebedev Printing House.
- "Иргизские единоверческие монастыри" [Irgiz Edinoverie Monasteries]. Brockhaus and Efron Encyclopedic Dictionary (in Russian). Vol. XIII. pp. 310–311.
- Lebedev, A. A. (1911). К истории старообрядчества на Иргизе [Toward the History of Old Belief on the Irgiz] (in Russian). Moscow: I. M. Mashistov Typo-Lithography.
- Melnikov-Pechersky, P. I. (1976). "Очерки поповщины" [Sketches of Popovshchina]. Собрание сочинений в 8 т [Collected Works in 8 Volumes] (in Russian). Moscow: Unknown. p. 476.
- Blok, V. S.; Katrenko, K. A., eds. (2002). Монастыри Самарского края (XVI—XX вв.): Справочник [Monasteries of the Samara Krai (16th–20th Centuries): A Reference Guide] (in Russian). Samara: Samara Dom Pechati. pp. 97–112. ISBN 5-7350-0350-X.
- Kargin, Yu. Yu. (2007). "Иргизские монастыри" [Irgiz Monasteries]. Балаковская народная энциклопедия [Balakovo Popular Encyclopedia] (in Russian). idea and compilation by Yu. Yu. Kargin. Saratov: Privolzhskoye Izdatelstvo.
- Naumlyuk, A. A. (2009). Центр старообрядчества на Иргизе: появление, деятельность, взаимоотношения с властью [The Centre of Old Belief on the Irgiz: Origins, Activity, and Relations with the Authorities] (PDF) (in Russian). Saratov: Nauchnaya Kniga. ISBN 978-5-9758-1147-9.
- Polozova, I. V. Библиотеки Иргизских и Черемшанских старообрядческих монастырей (к вопросу изучения рукописного певческого наследия) [Libraries of the Irgiz and Cheremshan Old Believer Monasteries (On the Study of the Manuscript Singing Heritage)] // Slavic Almanac 2009. — Moscow, 2010. — pp. 258–274.
- Ageeva, E. A.; Ryazhev, A. S.; Khachayants, A. G. "Иргизские монастыри" [Irgiz Monasteries]. Orthodox Encyclopedia (in Russian). Vol. 26. pp. 356–364.
- Polozova, I. V. Иргизские и Черемшанские монастыри и их роль в жизни саратовского старообрядчества [The Irgiz and Cheremshan Monasteries and Their Role in the Life of Saratov Old Belief] // Izvestiya of Saratov State University. History Series. 2013. — Vol. 13. — Issue 1. — pp. 102–109.
- Hieromonk Varsonofy (Yashin). Единоверие и старообрядчество в городе Кузнецке [Edinoverie and Old Belief in the Town of Kuznetsk] // Pravda Pravoslaviya. 2018. — No. 1 (77). — pp. 16–23.
- Ageeva, E. A. Иргизские монастыри в контексте русской культуры XVIII-XIX вв. [The Irgiz Monasteries in the Context of Russian Culture of the 18th–19th Centuries] // Aktualnye problemy gumanitarnykh i sotsialno-ekonomicheskikh nauk. — 2018. — Vol. 12, No. S2. — pp. 4–10.
- Suleymanova, N. I. (2018). "Роль М. Н. Тихомирова, К. И. Журавлева и А. И. Тереножкина в спасении и сохранении исторических ценностей Иргизских монастырей" [The Role of M. N. Tikhomirov, K. I. Zhuravlev and A. I. Terenozhkin in Saving and Preserving the Historical Treasures of the Irgiz Monasteries] (PDF). 255-letie Irgizskogo staroobryadchestva kak yavleniya Drevlepravoslaviya: Materialy Pyatykh Mezhdunarodnykh Maltsevskikh kraevedcheskikh chteniy (18–19 October 2018) (in Russian). Saratov–Moscow: Desyataya Muza: 61–67.
- Kargin, Yu. Yu. (2018). "«К одному знаменателю». Расправа над Иргизскими старообрядческими монастырями: новые документы" ["To a Common Denominator": The Crackdown on the Irgiz Old Believer Monasteries — New Documents] (PDF). 255-letie Irgizskogo staroobryadchestva kak yavleniya Drevlepravoslaviya: Materialy Pyatykh Mezhdunarodnykh Maltsevskikh kraevedcheskikh chteniy (18–19 October 2018) (in Russian). Saratov–Moscow: Desyataya Muza: 68–75.
- Polozova, I. V. (2018). "Певческие традиции Иргизских монастырей: сохранение и обновление средневекового певческого канона" [Singing Traditions of the Irgiz Monasteries: Preservation and Renewal of the Medieval Chant Canon] (PDF). 255-letie Irgizskogo staroobryadchestva kak yavleniya Drevlepravoslaviya: Materialy Pyatykh Mezhdunarodnykh Maltsevskikh kraevedcheskikh chteniy (18–19 October 2018) (in Russian). Saratov–Moscow: Desyataya Muza: 86–92.
