= Sergiy Yurshev =

Russian religious figure

- Сергий Юршев

Personal life
- Born: Simon Petrovich Yurshev; 1745
- Died: c. 1799 (53–54 years)
- Occupation: Monastery abbot

Religious life
- Religion: Russian Orthodox
- Order: Old Believers
- Philosophy: Edinoverie movement

Sergiy Yurshev (Russian: Сергий Юршев, secular name Simon Petrovich Yurshev, Симон Петрович Юршев) (1745 — circa 1799) was a Russian religious figure of the 18th century.

He was the founder of the Old Believer Irgiz monasteries and contributed significantly to their all-Russian fame, but later joined the Edinoverie movement and was expelled from the Irgiz, despite the patronage of the authorities. Subsequently, he became the abbot of an Edinoverie monastery, leaving behind a number of religious writings directed against the Schism of the Russian Church and in support of Edinoverie. In the Brockhaus and Efron Encyclopedic Dictionary, he is described as an outstanding figure for the benefit of Edinoverie.

== Historiography ==
Despite his enormous role in the Old Believer community's life, the personality of Sergiy is poorly covered in historical literature. Only a few main sources of his biography are known.

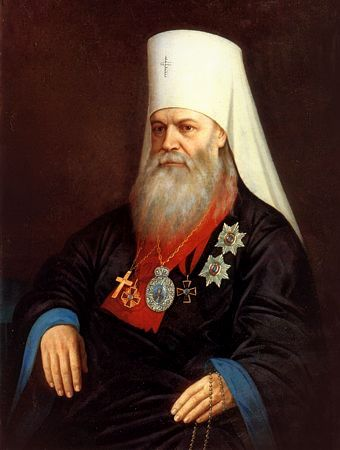
Metropolitan Macarius (Bulgakov)

The longest period of Sergiy's life is covered by Moscow Metropolitan Macarius (Bulgakov) in his work The history of the Russian schism known as Old Belief, which went through at least three editions. However, his work contains numerous outright errors, including indications of historically inaccurate events, confusion of surnames, dates, and facts, which allows the reliability of his sources —which Macarius does not cite— to be assessed as very low.

The history of the Russian schism known as Old Belief. 1855 edition

A number of details about Sergiy's biography are found in the work of historian Ivan Dobrotvorsky Historical information about the Irgiz pseudo-Old Believer monasteries before their conversion to the Orthodox faith. Rich in details and facts is the manuscript of an unknown author titled The History of Sergius of Irgiz signed with the initials A. Ya., which was kept in the Imperial Public Library. It was written in Volsk in 1797 and mainly covers the situation with the attempt to introduce Edinoverie on the Irgiz. It is written with noticeable sympathy for Sergiy, but without descending into bias. According to historians, it is distinguished by a high degree of reliability, simplicity, and naturalness of writing, most likely by an eyewitness to the events.

Another important manuscript relating to the same historical period is The story of the false monk Sergiy by a certain monk of the Upper Dormition Monastery named Theoph. in October 1797 by the blessing of the monastery. According to the assessment of 19th-century historian Nikolai Sokolov, it is characterized by the author's strong personal dislike for Sergiy and an apologia for his rivals, but despite the negative-emotional component, the facts are presented quite reliably. It was previously kept in the library of A. I. Khudov.

Some details of Sergiy's biography are revealed in his own work Mirror for Old Believers who do not submit to the Orthodox Church.

Significant work on generalizing sources was done by Saratov historian Nikolai Sokolov in his master's thesis The split in the Saratov region. Research based on unpublished materials. Considering that more sources were available to him than have survived to the present day, a significant part of the information on materials whose current location is difficult or impossible to determine is cited in this article with references precisely to his fundamental work. Historians of the 20th and 21st centuries have not added much to the scientific data on Sergiy, but they have nevertheless managed to clarify some details of his biography, including the date of birth.

== Biography ==
=== Early years ===
N. S. Sokolov Раскол в Саратовском крае (1888)

There is little information about Sergiy's early years, and the existing versions and details are quite contradictory. According to Macarius, he was the eldest son of Moscow merchant Peter Yurshev. Peter Yurshev was a well-known Old Believer and was one of the main culprits in the murder of Archimandrite Ambrose during the Plague Riot in Moscow in 1771, for which he paid the price. Fearing a repetition of his father's fate, Semyon hid in the forests of the Moscow Governorate, where he lived among Old Believers and various kinds of fugitives. It was there, in one of the sketes, that he took tonsure under the name Sergiy.

During one of the searches, Sergiy was detained and ended up in a Moscow prison, from which, however, he escaped to the Polish–Lithuanian Commonwealth, to the Vetka sloboda, which at that time was one of the Old Believer centers, and where many Russian Old Believers who had fled from persecution found refuge.

In 1776, Sergiy took advantage of the decree of Catherine II permitting schismatics to return to Russia. When crossing the border, he identified himself as a Russian native, allegedly not remembering where he was born or who brought him to Poland.

According to the generally accepted view, he managed to bring a portable folding church from Poland to Russia, prudently recording it in his passport. Later, this gave him the opportunity to set up the church in the monastery. However, Macarius believed that instead of a church, Sergiy brought an empty canvas wound on sticks through the border. In his opinion, Sergiy initially set himself the goal of becoming the head of the entire Irgiz community. Another researcher of the history of Saratov Old Believers, Ivan Dobrotvorsky, also believed that Sergiy planned to gain power over all the Irgiz monasteries even before arriving on the Irgiz. He supported this assertion with the fact of Sergiy's illegal construction of a church to strengthen his power, as the church brought new parishioners to the monasteries, and thus growth in income and influence.

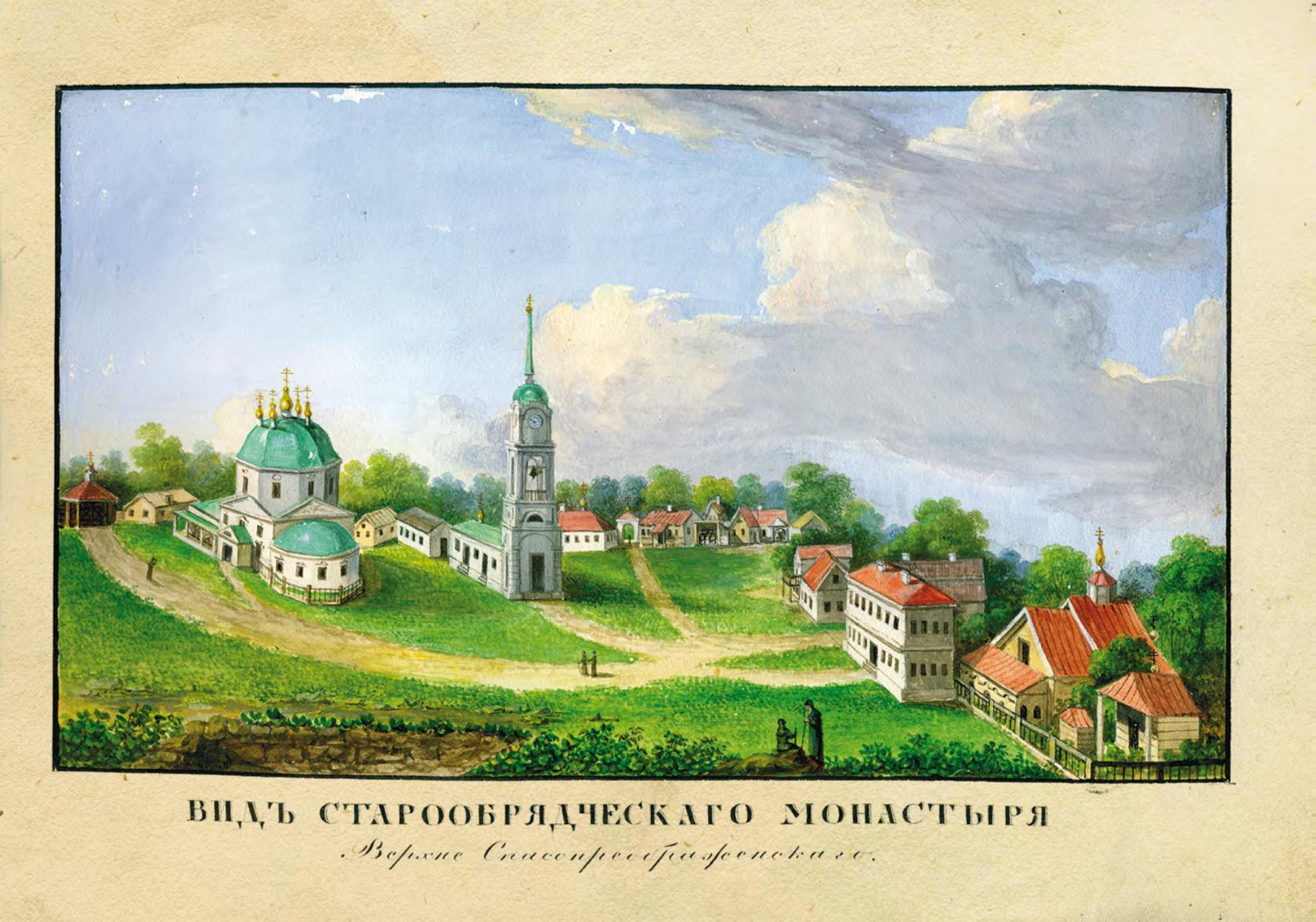
Upper Transfiguration Monastery

In the same 1776, according to Macarius, fearing to return to Moscow after his recent escape, Sergiy went to the Bolshoy Irgiz, where several fairly well-known Old Believer sketes operated. He chose the Isaakiev skete as his place of residence and soon gained respect among the monastery's inhabitants, clearly standing out from them not only as a native of Moscow and the son of a famous schismatic, but also as a well-read and educated person. Following him to the Irgiz came his mother Marina with his younger son and daughter, who took tonsure with the name Macrina.

However, Nikolai Sokolov, describing in his work Schism in the Saratov region the version of Metropolitan Macarius, notes that the latter provides no evidence that Sergiy was personally involved in the events of the Plague Riot or that he had any reasons to fear for his life and freedom before going into the forests. Moreover, Sokolov believed that such far-sighted plans for seizing power on the Irgiz, which Macarius attributes to Sergiy, are completely inconsistent with the further course of his biography, when he showed neither foresight nor the ability to analyze people in the events surrounding his joining Edinoverie. Modern researcher Anton Naumlyuk also believes that Sergiy's subsequent actions, in particular his long confrontation with other abbots regarding peremazovshchina, allow one to assume that Sergiy did indeed bring a folding church to the Irgiz, but he had no special plan.

=== Life on the Irgiz ===
The Irgiz period of Sergiy's life is better known: Sergiy quickly gained authority in the monastery, where there was a great shortage of literate people. Thus, during the Pugachev's Rebellion, one of the elders spoke about literate people in the monastery: "there are no such in the monastery; about twenty gathered, but they all ran away from the detective's command". Just a year after his appearance, Sergiy played a very important role in the management of the monastery. The founder and abbot of the monastery, Isaakiy, even sent him to Moscow to establish connections between the Irgiz and Moscow Old Believers. In Moscow, Sergiy witnessed the famous attempt by the Old Believer community of the Rogozhskoye Cemetery to boil chrism for the chrismation of Orthodox priests who wished to join the Old Believers. In his work The Mirror for the Old Believers, he left a number of recollections of this trip, including about the chrism-boiling procedure itself, during which he entered into a dispute with the performing priest, Vasily Cheboksarsky, regarding the fact that the latter did not read all the prayers prescribed by the canons. However, no matter how Sergiy felt in the depths of his soul about the legality of the procedure and the exact observance of the canon, in practice he recognized the legality of the chrism-boiling, not forgetting to stock up on the boiled chrism for his monastery, where it was absent.

He did not forget about another vital necessity for the monastery: for two years there had been no Old Believer priests on the Irgiz. Sergiy obtained from Mikhail Kalmyk, who was considered at that time the supreme father of the popovtsy, the hieromonk Jerome for performing church services.

=== Peremazansky Council ===
The attempt by the Rogozhskoye Cemetery community to boil chrism caused a major conflict in the Old Believer world.

The fact is that after the church reform of Nikon, not a single bishop joined the Old Believers, which led to a constant decrease in the number of priests adhering to the old rites. Some schismatics even formed a special trend—the Bespopovtsy, while the popovtsy accepted priests from the Nikonians into their ranks. However, the procedure for accepting fugitive priests varied for different Old Believer communities: in the Polish Vetka, the priest was immersed in the baptismal font in full vestments, and then anointed with chrism personally boiled by the priest Theodosius. The Kerzhene Old Believers anointed priests with chrism allegedly boiled before the schism by Patriarch Joseph, some communities accepted priests after a simple renunciation of heresies. And now other communities did not want to agree to the unification of the rite and the recognition of the primacy of the Moscow community. To resolve the conflict, a council was convened, later called the "Council on Re-anointing".

The council took place from November 1779 to January 1780, during which 10 sessions were held, attended by from 100 to 300 people. Sergiy participated in the council as one of the representatives of the Irgiz monasteries — a large Old Believer community. According to his recollections, he participated in the council as a simple observer. In the works of Nicodemus of Starodub, who left detailed notes on the council, Sergiy is mentioned only twice.

However, a well-known manuscript by one of the witnesses to this council allows the conclusion that Sergiy was a fairly prominent participant in the process, actively speaking at the sessions and skillfully playing on the contradictions between various communities, and Nicodemus in his work wrote that he asked to send Sergiy specifically as his opponent for discussion after Nicodemus himself was not allowed into one of the sessions.

The council ended inconclusively; the envoys from Starodubye categorically refused to recognize the Moscow re-anointing and completely quarreled with the other Old Believers, breaking away from them. The other delegates decided in the future to accept Orthodox priests only after re-anointing, simultaneously deciding to destroy the chrism boiled in 1777 and henceforth use the oil of "Patriarch Joseph". Sergiy supported the Moscow community, that is, he adhered to the opinion that re-anointing was necessary to cleanse priests from heretical defilement. During the debates at the council, Sergiy was even accused of heresy, but the support of the victorious party not only protected him from accusations but also elevated him to the ranks of Old Believer leaders. It was he who was sent to the camp of the opponents, to Starodubye, to notify them of the council's decision. However, on their own territory, his opponents could act more boldly: according to several testimonies, there they tried to simply kill Sergiy, and he barely escaped.

After his salvation and return to Moscow, Sergiy was entrusted with conducting a written polemic with Mikhail Kalmyk and Nicodemus of Starodub. Which he did, using all his eloquence and erudition. His work Inquisitive reasoning became the first attempt to place re-anointing on a canonical basis.

=== Abbacy ===
During Sergiy's stay in Moscow, the founder and abbot of his skete, Isaakiy, died. Before his death, he indicated Sergiy as his successor, with which the brethren agreed: with the name of Sergiy, already known in the Old Believer world as the unyielding "adamant of piety," they associated their hopes, and no one in the monastery could compare with him in glory.

However, Sergiy reluctantly accepted the proposed position, citing his youth and inexperience. How sincere his excuses were is unknown, but on May 3, 1780, the skete inhabitants drafted the following document:

By the good will and mercy of God the Father Almighty... all the brethren of the Upper Isaakiev Skete, have gathered for the election of an abbot for our monastery, and by the full common brotherly counsel, have chosen in our community as builder the monk Sergey, for the correction of all monastic needs, both spiritual and not. And let the abbot, the monk Sergey, above all have care for the common prayer temple..., so that it not be lacking in church service... And let us all the brethren, abiding under his hand, have unquestioning obedience in all God-pleasing deeds, and let the abbot teach us correctly and paternally with us... Let him by no means decide any matter pertaining to the monastery by himself, but let him have the treasurer in counsel with him... And if, beyond expectation, some great matter should occur concerning the whole monastery and all the brethren, let that matter be presented to the whole brethren at assembly and let brotherly counsel be taken humbly on the occurred matter.

In addition, the abbot was prescribed to monitor the fulfillment of the monastic rule according to the instructions of Macarius, Metropolitan of Moscow, so that "the elders not keep [women] with them and not drink intoxicating and hot wine; so that disorder not arise in the monastery and from disorder every evil deed be produced, that is, the destruction of patristic and monastic life."

Sergiy actively set about fulfilling the brethren's instructions: he drafted a rule for communal living and introduced a common refectory. Sergiy's rule is unknown to historians, but the rule of the Lower Resurrection Monastery has been preserved, which is known to have been created in analogy with the rule of the Upper Dormition:

1. Care for the brotherhood by any strength.
2. Have 12 people from the brethren for counsel, without which no matters are to be done.
3. Have a collection box in the churches for donations, which go exclusively to the priests.
4. If any of the brethren becomes guilty, feed him, do not deprive him of will, but punish only by determination with counsel.
5. All sums of offerings go to the abbot, but the string-bound books of income and expenditure are checked by the elders.
6. For receiving offerings in letters, appoint a special agent who will receive them, record them in books, hand them to the abbot, and he hands them to the treasurer or church warden.
7. Do not accept those coming on pilgrimage or for living without the Council under any circumstances.
8. For visitors, the treasurer allocates everything necessary.
9. The abbot is not to travel anywhere arbitrarily without the Council and the treasurer.
10. Expenditure of money by the abbot only after agreement of the Council and the treasurer.
11. If any of the brethren is guilty of a crime, hand him over to the public offices at the desire of the whole brethren.
12. Do not keep excess livestock, but for their care keep the corresponding number of workers.
13. If the abbot does not fulfill it, the Council reports it to the other abbots; if the abbot does not submit, a new one is elected.

Soon, thanks to connections with wealthy Old Believer merchants from Moscow and the Volga region, as well as his own fame, Sergiy managed to obtain permission from the local authorities for the construction of a permanent temple—contrary to existing legislation of the Russian Empire, which prohibited Old Believers from building churches. An altar was added to the existing chapel, and the new church was consecrated in honor of the Entry of the Most Holy Theotokos into the Temple.

Details of this event are found only in the work of Metropolitan Macarius, which, as noted earlier, is not distinguished by the quality and reliability of sources. According to Macarius, the matter proceeded as follows: Sergiy first petitioned the authorities for permission to repair the chapel after a fire. Having received such permission, he immediately built a new five-domed church with a bell tower, still calling it a chapel, and filed a new petition: to allow the placement in this chapel of a temporary canvas church brought by him from abroad, in order to have the opportunity to serve several liturgies to replenish stocks of the Holy Gifts. The hieromonk, through Sergiy's efforts, had already appeared in the monastery several years earlier. And again permission was obtained, but the church turned out not temporary, but permanent.

Be that as it may, the first full-fledged church appeared on the Irgiz, divine liturgy began to be served in the monastery, and the skete received the name of the Upper Monastery. This became the beginning of the flourishing of the Irgiz monasteries. The news of the formal permission for worship on the Irgiz quickly spread throughout the country, and crowds of pilgrims began to flock to the monastery from all corners of Russia: the Urals, the Don, the Volga, Siberia, Saint Petersburg. Some went to venerate the holy places, believing the widespread legend that the sites for building the monasteries on the Irgiz were indicated from above, and that incorrupt relics of holy ascetics repose there. Others went for the Holy Gifts. Soon the small Vvedensky church could no longer accommodate all the visitors, and the hieromonk Jerome could not cope with all the necessary services. The issue of expanding the number of priests became acute.

The Irgiz monasteries, even before the Council on Re-anointing, did not accept "uncorrected" priests, and after it this became completely impossible. Starodubye, having broken away from the majority after the council, discredited itself in the eyes of the Old Believers and also could not send new priests. Sergiy found a way out: he decided to transfer the privileges of Starodubye to the Irgiz, where he himself hoped to take the place of Mikhail Kalmyk. His composed Explanatory Discourse ultimately quite convincingly proved that without re-anointing, priests defiled by "affusion baptism" cannot be accepted. But correcting priests and cleansing them from defilement by chrismation is possible only where there is a true church and true chrism. After the defection from the fugitive popovtsy trend of Starodubye, the church and chrism existed in only one place: the Upper Monastery on the Irgiz. Sergiy quite carefully masked this idea of his in arguments and references to canonical rules and patristic establishments. Some Old Believers did not understand the hidden meaning of the writing, others understood but did not want to accept it.

First of all, dissatisfaction with such exaltation of Sergiy was expressed by the other abbots of the Irgiz monasteries. Anthony, abbot of the Philaretov skete, stated that in case of acute need, Old Believers can accept Orthodox priests without additional re-anointing, and supported his words with action by accepting into the monastery without correction a certain priest Vasily. Sergiy responded by convening a council held on August 2, 1782 "at the church of the honorable and glorious Entry into the Temple of the Mother of God." Anthony also attended the council, but all of Sergiy's arguments that the baptism and ordination of "affusionists" and "single immersers" cannot be recognized as true and re-anointing is mandatory were not heard. The council ended in nothing, all sides remained with their opinions.

On March 5, 1783, a "full general assembly" was again convened in the Upper Monastery. And although the majority spoke in favor of Sergiy, accepting and approving the Rogozh rules of re-anointing, this was not enough for Sergiy. He sought complete submission to his course from the other abbots, including the unyielding Anthony. For this purpose, Sergiy entered into a written polemic with his opponent, sending him a series of questions regarding church canons. Anthony replied, but using not references to church statutes, but primarily his own opinion as arguments. Sergiy did not delay in taking advantage of his rival's blunder and gathered the brethren of his monastery, where he read Anthony's answers. The brethren hastened to agree with their abbot and entrusted him with writing a "conciliar consideration," which was soon sent to the major Old Believer communities. In it, Sergiy simply recorded his opponent as a heretic, accusing him of stubbornness and unwillingness to submit to the truth. Anthony did not delay in responding with a new letter, and the matter went in a new circle. Such active open correspondence between the abbots lasted quite a long time.

=== 1783 Council ===
Meanwhile, Sergiy continued church construction in his monastery, as the Vvedensky temple no longer met the needs of the monastery and the believers. Soon after its consecration, construction of a new temple began. The civil authorities did not hinder the construction, and thanks to generous donations from all over Russia, the temple was soon built. On December 19, 1783, it was consecrated in honor of the Dormition of the Mother of God, and the monastery became known as the Upper Dormition (under this name it existed until 1804, when it was renamed the Upper Transfiguration). Numerous believers arrived for the solemn ceremony of consecrating the new Old Believer temple, rare in the Russian Empire, mainly Saratov, Volsk, and Khalynsk merchants. Sergiy did not miss the opportunity to use this for his purposes and on the day of consecration gathered a "general assembly" in the monastery, proposing to those present in one way or another to resolve the issue of re-anointing. He was confident in the disposition of the merchants and hoped that the assembly would take his side, after which Anthony would have nothing left but to submit: quarreling with generous benefactors was extremely disadvantageous. This calculation proved correct.

The general assembly adopted the "holy-righteous consideration and explanatory common position of the holy church and all Christianity":

1. That the holy Christian church have in itself holy-legal every determination in all things, according to the holy-apostolic and holy-patristic holy rules binding and supervisory;
2. That it use them each in its time, and not as some wanderers from the holy church used holy-apostolic and holy-patristic traditions not in their time, from which they wandered and for which they received a curse from the holy church, and not a blessing;
3. That it not accept those baptized by Little Russian affusion and the ordination proceeding from affusionists and to sacred ministry by no means admit such, and those priests accepted from affusionists are left in their places and consigned to silence;
4. That nowhere newly accept arriving priests except at the holy church, for better legal consideration in all things;
5. When, wherever due to some necessary need, some newly arrived priest is accepted, then speedily give notice from that place to the holy church, for union-loving submission to the holy church.

Although Anthony perfectly understood against whom such formulations were directed, which church was called holy, saw that the fourth and fifth points secured for the Upper Dormition Monastery the privilege of accepting fugitive priests for an indefinite time, realized all the spiritual and material benefits of such a monopoly, he was forced to submit, putting his signature under the document immediately after Sergiy. However, he apparently did not hide his dissatisfaction with the decision, as Sergiy, commenting on the council's decision, stated that "the abbot Anthony of the holy church and its general assembly... submitted with unwilling zeal". Anthony's dissatisfaction was understandable: as can be seen from the signatures to the document, by this time the Upper Monastery had four priests, one hieromonk, one hierodeacon, and one deacon, which allowed services with all splendor, while the Philaretov skete had no clergy at all, putting the monastery in direct dependence on Sergiy.

But overall, Sergiy achieved complete victory. The conciliar position essentially placed him at the head of the entire popovtsy trend of Old Believers, and the Upper Monastery received a de facto monopoly on "re-anointing" priests. Developing the success, Sergiy immediately sent copies of the resolution to all major communities, presenting this council as a direct continuation of the Moscow council of 1779. But although all communities accepted the council's resolution for information, not all wished to fulfill its decisions. The Siberian Old Believers refused to submit to the Irgiz resolutions, arguing that they accept not "affusionists" but "triple immersers" who received ordination from Georgian bishops or from Piryatislav's Alexius and Astrakhan's Hilarion, about whom it is exactly known that they themselves are not affusionists and were ordained not by affusionists, and therefore do not consist "in confusion" with heretical bishops. Learning of this, Anthony revived and again spoke out against Sergiy, defending affusion baptism and affusion ordination, and even again accepted some priest into the monastery without correction. And if Sergiy could oppose Anthony by convening a new council, an attempt to force submission from the large and influential Siberian Old Believer community by similar methods threatened schism and loss of all obtained privileges. To fight the Siberian Old Believers, Sergiy chose the already tested literary path of persuasion.

His new work Discourse with Doubters on the Holy Church and Orthodox Priesthood was completed and sent to the Old Believers in April 1786. In it, he again defended the positions from his previous labors: that affusion baptism is the root ulcer of the Russian church and the main heresy, that there is now not a single Orthodox bishop in Rus', as some are themselves baptized by affusion, others are ordained by affusionists, thirds are in close connection with them, including the Georgian bishops, and Piryatislav's Alexius, and Astrakhan's Hilarion. Sergiy wrote that only in the Dormition Irgiz monastery was the apostolic teaching, correct sacred hierarchy, and the same performance of sacraments invariantly preserved, and therefore only it, only the holy church, has the right "in need or supervision of time to allow deviation from the law." After which Sergiy circumstantially and with references to the decisions of early Christian councils proved that such deviation from church rules is in principle possible and acceptable by necessity.

The "Discourse" worked; the popovtsy submitted, yielding both the Siberian Old Believers and other doubters, henceforth considering the church position of the general assembly of 1783 canonical. The monopoly right of the Irgiz monasteries to correct fugitive priests was no longer disputed, and the period of their flourishing began. For the first time since the schism of Starodubye and the transition to "heresy" of Nicodemus and Mikhail Kalmyk, the popovtsy Old Believers had authority, supreme leadership, and visible legality. Considering these merits of Sergiy, as well as his works on establishing monastic life on the Irgiz, contemporaries bestowed on Sergiy the title of "builder," of which he was very proud.

Meanwhile, on the Irgiz, the other monasteries followed Sergiy's example: rules were adopted, church construction began, solemnity, splendor, and effectiveness ensured Sergiy and his associates a constant influx of pilgrims to the monasteries. The Irgiz correction of priests worked so intensively that almost annually decrees appeared from the authorities prohibiting the admission of fugitive priests to the Irgiz monasteries. However, enterprising Old Believers founded a highly profitable business on sending corrected priests throughout the country, the income from which, directed to bribes, allowed them to ignore the demands of the Synodical Church.

=== Conversion to Edinoverie ===
The next few years of Sergiy's life are practically not reflected in historical documents and literature. It is known that on July 6, 1786, elections of the abbot took place in the Upper Dormition Monastery, but neither the reason for Sergiy's resignation nor the name of his successor is known. It is also known that in 1790 Sergiy was again in the position of abbot — on July 18 in this capacity he sent his "questions" to Nikifor Theotoky.

When and why such an "adamant of piety" as Sergiy converted to Edinoverie is also unknown. Two similar versions are described in the literature.

According to Metropolitan Macarius's version, it was precisely Astrakhan Archbishop Nikifor Theotoky who converted Sergiy from the schism, and the reason for this was observing the morality and behavior of fugitive priests: "their shameful, scandalous life led Sergiy to the thought of asking the synod for lawful pastors". Dobrotvorsky agrees with this, additionally pointing to an incident that especially affected Sergiy: during one of the processions a woman threw herself at the feet of the leading priest and began accusing him that he was a perjurer, deceiver, who left her, his lawful wife, with young children without a crust of bread.

However, Nikolai Sokolov, referring to the Mirror for Old Believers, indicates that Sergiy knew of fugitive priests' transgressions even worse, and such a scandal could not have been an important episode. Sokolov believes that one of the reasons was the rapid growth in popularity of the abbot of the Lower Resurrection Monastery, Prokhor Kalmykov, whom Sergiy considered a serious competitor in the struggle for the position of supreme Irgiz administrator. Another reason Sokolov names the closeness to the wealthy merchant Vasily Zlobin. It became inconvenient for Zlobin to confess the schism in the circles in which he moved thanks to his millions: ministers, high-society balls and routs, foreign envoys, and he was considering a certain compromise with the Synodical Church, similar to the one previously concluded by Nicodemus of Starodub. However, Zlobin did not wish to act as the initiator of such a conversion and decided to act through his friend Sergiy. The date of the supposed internal conversion to Edinoverie can be judged from Sergiy's own words in the preface to his 1799 published "Mirror for Old Believers": "it has already been ten years since I renounced their (old) teaching."

Sergiy undertook the conversion of the community to Edinoverie quite cautiously. Having received the encyclical message of Nikifor Theotoky addressed to the Old Believers, he, as if in response, composed 15 questions on several points of disagreement between Old Believers and Nikonians and read them at an assembly of Irgiz abbots and senior brethren. The assembled approved the questionnaire and authorized Sergiy to send it to Nikifor with his signature and the signature of the monastery's warden Prokhor. Taking advantage of Nikifor's arrival in the Saratov Governorate to inspect churches, Sergiy appeared to him on July 18, 1790, during which he handed over the questions and a petition, in which, among other things, it was said:

Seeing your good will and paternal mercy, we dare to fall at the feet of your high prelate and ask for your archpastoral legal reasoning and decisiveness from the holy fathers' writings on our following presentation to you. We ask you to lead not only us wretched ones out of doubt, but also others of our Old Believer unity, so that everyone may see your archpastoral legal reasoning and decisiveness, and could not only we, but everyone without doubt come and join the Greco-Russian holy Orthodox Church, and if your high prelate gives us this desired and requested holy-church correct and undoubted resolution, we, in the name of our entire society, promise before Almighty God, according to the resolution, to join the Greco-Russian Orthodox Church.

Sergiy's questions in themselves are unremarkable; their moderation, softness, and restraint compared to the usual questions in such discussions are curious. Most likely, Sergiy anticipated in advance what answers would be given, but he needed a formal occasion to initiate the process of joining the community to Edinoverie. Nikolai Sokolov suggests in his work that the participants in the conciliar council most likely noted the softness and triteness of the questions, which is why they refused to put their signatures under them. The touchingness of the appeal, and most importantly, the promise on Sergiy's part to renounce Old Believerism together with the most influential Irgiz community, could not but attract special attention of Nikifor, who composed "Answers to 15 Questions of the Irgiz Schismatics and a Discourse on Holy Chrism," subsequently reprinted several times. Having received the archbishop's answers, Sergiy immediately sent copies of them to all Old Believer communities, thereby quite clearly demonstrating his intentions. This was probably the reason for his repeated resignation from the position of abbot, presumably at the end of 1791.

In the biography of Sergiy authored by A. Ya., there are reports that some monks even tried to kill Sergiy, but he was saved by the unexpected arrival of the ispravnik. At the same time, the attackers avoided punishment thanks to bribes to officials from the wealthy Old Believer merchant Rastorguev.

For the year spent as a simple monk, Sergiy traveled to Astrakhan several times, where he met with Nikifor. In the work of unknown authorship "Notes on the Ancient Shroud Kept in Astrakhan," transmitted in 1833 to the Saratov bishop Jacob (Vecherkov) by the Ober-Procurator of the Synod Nechaev, it is told that Nikifor "was carried away by the spirit of evangelical zeal to overcome the fighter of delusions with the truth of Orthodoxy and salvation." The ancient shroud, kept in the Astrakhan cathedral, the construction of which dates to the pre-schism period, on which the Savior is depicted with fingers folded according to the rules of the Orthodox Church, according to this work, finally convinced Sergiy to convert to the Orthodox Church. And although it is doubtful that it was precisely the shroud that convinced Sergiy, especially since he never converted to Orthodoxy, only to Edinoverie, the fact of its examination and repeated disputations on faith with Nikifor is undoubted.

Meanwhile, it turned out that Cyril, who replaced Sergiy as abbot, was completely unfit; under him the monastery was actually plundered, the monastery's property was openly embezzled, so that already after a year it had a miserable appearance. The brethren again turned to Sergiy with a request to take the place of abbot. He refused several times, but eventually agreed "mainly at the conviction of the Volsk merchants." The elections held on January 28, 1793, were indeed greatly influenced by Vasily Zlobin, still seeking ways for a scandal-free transition to a more convenient religious trend.

The act of election, witnessed on February 2 by the ispravnik, is quite curious:

"Being at the general assembly, having again elected, we all the brethren have entreated the former builder Sergiy to be abbot over us, with the condition that we all unanimously be in every obedience to him, the abbot, as duty and order commands monks; and we all bind ourselves to him, the abbot, as our first shepherd in every respect from us; and among ourselves all the brethren to live in perfect agreement, undividedly, and in all bad, especially in drunken deeds, by no means for any of us, elders or laymen, to turn to and intoxicating drinks no one of us in our cells... under no circumstances to have."

Having secured such a paper, Sergiy ruled the monastery with a firm hand, so that already in two years the monastery restored its former appearance. True, many monks could not withstand the strictness of his management and left the monastery, going to the Urals or the Don. Having dealt with the main monastic problems by 1795, Sergiy again engaged in promoting Edinoverie. On the Irgiz, his persistence was explained as follows: "Fortified everywhere with well-being, the apostate Sergiy was lifted up in heart, like the ancient Pharaoh and Nebuchadnezzar, leaving God's help..."

But Sergiy was now not alone in his endeavor. In addition to Zlobin, his idea was supported by influential Volsk merchants Vasily Epifanov, Pyotr Sapozhnikov, Zlobin's brother-in-law Pyotr Volkoynov, and other less significant Volsk citizens. His propaganda caused much noise: "Seeing in him the fathers' spiritual disorder, they feared lest his tares be mixed into the mature wheat and could harm the salvation of simple souls and lead from the right path to another, which our fathers did not betray". And an opposing party formed from Prokhor Kalmykov, his associate Sergiy Syrtovsky, Zlobin's wife Pelageya, a zealous schismatic, and another prominent merchant Ivan Rastorguev, and in 1795 they managed to achieve Sergiy's removal.

=== Resignation ===
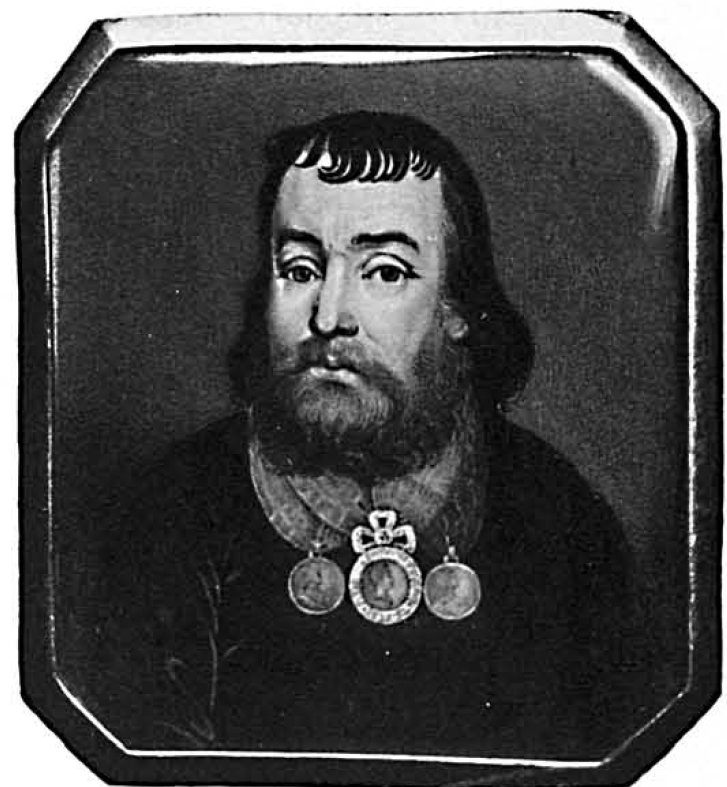
Vasily Zlobin

In Zlobin's house, a "full assembly of monastics and citizens" was held, at which the host asked the question: "Do you, father lords, wish Father Builder Sergiy to be the leader?" To which the assembled, prompted by Prokhor and Pelageya Zlobina, shouted: "Undesirable, undesirable!" To Zlobin's question why and in what his guilt lay, Prokhor with Sergiy Syrtovsky answered: "What greater vice than that almost all the fathers doubt him, about his composition 'Conversation of the Orthodox with the Opposing' and about the 'Questions,' recognizing in everything that he is completely departing from us, and praises the Great Russian church in everything and considers it graceful? This vice is more important than any vice... We all disagree with him in this." Attempts by Sergiy to explain himself were interrupted; his opponents knew his skill in conducting religious disputations and did not intend to give him even the opportunity to speak. According to one version, the assembly ended with Sergiy, after Zlobin's persuasions, answering that he wanted "to work on enlightening and uniting the brethren with the church," but since he found no support, he renounces the idea. Zlobin was pleased with such an answer and even assigned Sergiy a pension of 300 rubles a year. According to another version, he had to give an oath and subscription that he would remain faithful to the Irgiz holy church. Undoubtedly, in the absence of open support from Zlobin, Sergiy had to make concessions: it was more convenient to conduct agitation in favor of Edinoverie as abbot than as a simple monk. However, he was deprived of the position of abbot. His place was taken by the former soldier Isaakiy, an illiterate and deaf man. This decision ended the assembly.

The next day Sergiy appeared to Zlobin to understand what position he actually held—whether he supported the Old Believers or was ready to join Edinoverie and accept blessed priests by the bishop. Zlobin answered evasively, advised not to hurry, and recommended going to Saint Petersburg to negotiate there about blessed priesthood, promising meanwhile to prepare the ground for Edinoverie on the Irgiz. Sergiy believed. However, his diplomacy and compliance came to naught: not ten days had passed after the council when a notebook with Sergiy's composition fell into the elders' hands, in which he proved the truth of the two-finger sign, calling the Old Believer two-fingered sign heretical. The news of such a heretical composition and apostasy from the given oath quickly spread along the Irgiz.

Then Sergiy decided to act directly, turning to the elders for blessing to go to Starodubye. Confused by such audacity, the monks gathered for counsel twice, but Sergiy invariably answered that he wanted to go for his own needs. With that he left, but the news of his trip preceded him. He had not yet reached Volsk when the local Old Believers became alarmed, especially since all remembered Sergiy's alliance with several prominent Volsk citizens. One source even reports that Pelageya Zlobina publicly promised that if Sergiy went to Petersburg, she would do everything to intercept and kill him.

=== Efforts to Convert the Monastery to Edinoverie ===
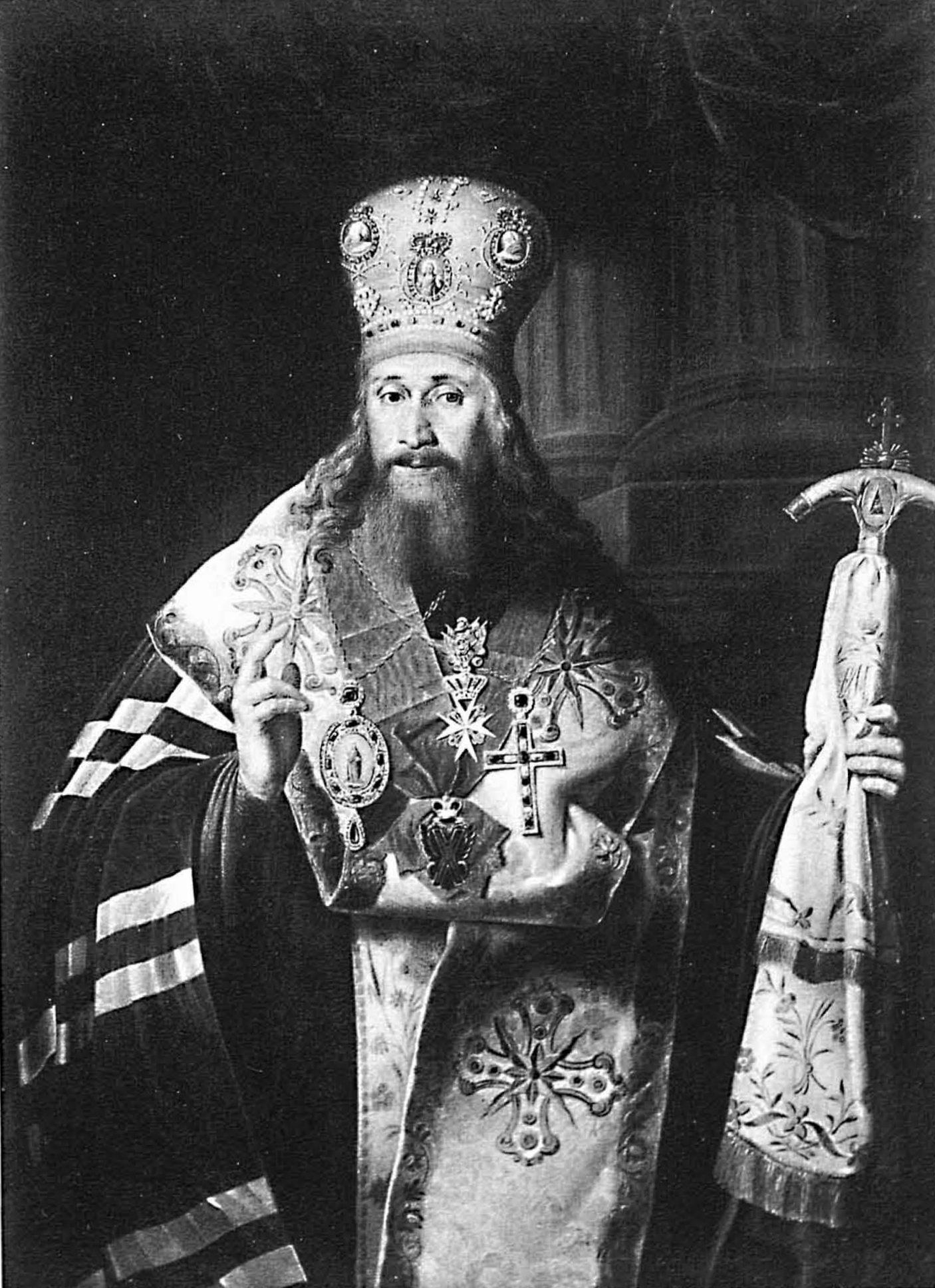
Ambrose

Nevertheless, Sergiy safely reached Saint Petersburg, where he submitted a petition to the Kazan bishop Ambrose, then sitting in the Synod, in which, calling himself the builder of the Dormition Irgiz monastery, on behalf of the entire brethren petitioned for the appointment to the monastery of an Orthodox priest on the terms previously given to the Crimean Old Believers, that is, with being under the jurisdiction of the Kazan Diocese and permission to perform services according to old-printed books.

Ambrose gladly agreed, a petition followed to the Synod, which was relatively quickly satisfied thanks to the assistance of Metropolitan Gabriel and Aleksey Ivanovich Musin-Pushkin. In the highest rescript of June 19, 1796, to the Kazan Archbishop Ambrose, the desired resolution followed.

Having accomplished the planned in the capital, on August 30, 1796, Sergiy arrived in Moscow. The local Old Believers plotted a conspiracy—"better for us to destroy one such apostate than for many of us to perish," fearing that if Sergiy really began agitation against the old rites, he would act as skillfully and resolutely as once in their favor, and his loud name and knowledge of many unsightly things could seduce and lead many astray. Sergiy did not fall into the trap, and it was not possible to lure him to places where he could be dealt with. A new plan was drawn up.

On September 10, 1796, it became known that Sergiy was planning to leave and had hired a cabman to Saratov. A delegation from the Old Believers appealed directly to the civil governor P. Kozlov, who sent a trusted person to the quarterly overseer Sergiy Veniaminovich, overseer of the Old Believer cemetery, with a verbal order to fulfill the Old Believers' request. That same evening, September 10, the quarterly arrested Sergiy and sent him to the police station "under strict and harsh guard." The news of Sergiy's arrest caused a real celebration at the Rogozhskoye Cemetery: "...Builder Sergiy the apostate from us is sitting in the police station; perhaps he will lose his life".

For three and a half days Sergiy spent in confinement; he was repeatedly thoroughly searched, hoping to find with him the highest command on the conversion of the Irgiz to Edinoverie. His life was in constant danger; no one was allowed to him except his enemies; only one of his friends managed to secretly supply him with food and drink. Sergiy's friends saved him; someone reported the incident to the police chief Pavel Kaverin, who ordered Veniaminovich to deliver Sergiy to him. Veniaminovich was frightened and secretly took Sergiy personally to the governor. He asked where the police chief learned about the prisoner and ordered to fulfill Kaverin's order, telling him that he would not interfere in this matter but leave it to the police chief's consideration. Veniaminovich delivered Sergiy to Kaverin, where he reported that he arrested the builder on the governor's order, as someone informed him that he "has with him some false papers and passport." The next day the police chief and the quarterly brought Sergiy to the Moscow commander-in-chief Mikhail Mikhailovich Izmaylov. He received Sergiy kindly and, having listened to his story from the police chief, offered to file a complaint. Sergiy refused: "I am a monk and must in everything follow in the footsteps of the Savior... take upon myself His cross..., and not enter into worldly paper troubles".

Izmaylov offered an escort on the way, to which Sergiy agreed. On September 16, under convoy of a soldier detachment with a sergeant at the head, he left Moscow; from Kolomna he was accompanied by the local town mayor, and on October 12 Sergiy safely arrived in Volsk, where he stayed at the monastic metochion. The city head Vasily Epifanov congratulated Sergiy on his safe arrival and receipt of the monarch's mercy: "we all as the best people agree to that, and we thank you very much for it; only such a God-pleasing matter must be started as modestly as possible," after which he asked him to stay in the city, saying that the monastic elders asked to notify them of Sergiy's arrival in advance. A messenger was sent to the monastery.

However, in the monastery they did not intend to accept Sergiy. His novice, sent with news of the imminent arrival, was excommunicated from communion, forbidden to eat, drink, and pray with him; they even began to feed him from special dishes. The priest who granted the novice forgiveness and cleansing from the defilement of the journey upon arrival had to literally beg forgiveness from the brethren according to a hastily invented rite, as he was considered defiled. Immediately a council was convened, where Prokhor Kalmykov spoke most against Sergiy, proving that he had no highest command and was acting arbitrarily: "Listen, you elders and laymen, here Sergiy the apostate is coming and whoever agrees with him, or who goes to a cell and lets him in, whatever that person, elder or layman... we will do everything to expel him to the last penny and deprive him of place...". The council decided not to admit Sergiy to the monastery not only for leadership but even for residence.

=== Expulsion ===
Until October 21, Sergiy waited for a response from the Irgiz, but instead of a response, a whole delegation of monastery abbots and prominent elders arrived, who asked the city head to convene an assembly on the 22nd, where they could talk with Sergiy. The assembly took place, attended by up to 200 people. And again, Sergiy was not allowed to enter into religious disputations, in which he was strong and convincing, and when Sergiy presented the papers sent from the Kazan bishop on the conversion of the monastery, Prokhor took the floor: "Builder Sergiy has completely departed from piety, because he agrees to pray to God for the empress and the entire royal family for health and calls them in prayer pious and faithful; also to pray for the repose of the souls of the deceased from the entire royal family; also for the holy synod and the diocesan bishop; so whoever wants to agree with him, let him be, but we disagree with him in this." Rastorguev also supported him, and many after him shouted "disagree, disagree". Sergiy tried to prove that the empress can be called pious and faithful, but Prokhor and Rastorguev with their supporters again raised a noise. The assembly ended in nothing but a quarrel between prominent Volsk citizens: Rastorguev on one side and Sapozhnikov and the city head on the other. Thus, skillfully playing on minor but conflicting details, Sergiy's opponents managed to leave him idle.

On October 25, Sergiy appealed to the ispravnik Peter Bezobrazov with a request to give him escorts to the monastery in addition to the two Cossacks given by the governor. The ispravnik did not advise going to the monastery, informing that the monastery abbots had submitted a petition to the court stating that they did not agree to see Sergiy in the monasteries even for residence. In the end, obeying the decree from the governorate administration and the governor's order to assist Sergiy in everything, the ispravnik announced to the elders that he could not prevent Sergiy from returning to the monastery. However, until special orders were received, Sergiy was prescribed not to interfere in the monastery's affairs. Sergiy requested permission to conduct an inventory of the monastic property, as he was informed that it was being plundered. For this, the ispravnik assigned him the noble assessor Nikiforov and the registrar Ufimcev. On October 28, Sergiy arrived at the monastery. It turned out that indeed much of the monastic property was missing: canvases, cloth, steel, iron, sheepskins, and other things were short by more than 2 thousand rubles. However, contrary to the ispravnik's direct order, having received considerable bribes, Nikiforov and Ufimcev refused to inventory the property and left.

Sergiy found himself in a very difficult position. He was not allowed either into the church or the cellar, they gave him no food; his native sister, the nun Alexandra, fed him, who was also oppressed. Only on December 23 did the ispravnik arrive at the monastery with a decree from the governorate administration, by which the brethren were prohibited from appealing to the district court, governorate or provincial administration; the only path indicated was to the diocesan bishop. The ispravnik also permitted Sergiy to go to the church, cellar, and brethren's cells. However, after his departure, Sergiy was still not allowed into the church. From both temples, the vestments, books, sticharia, candlesticks, and other utensils were carried to the cellar, and the churches themselves were locked and services were not held. Sergiy went with a complaint to the Volsk zemsky court and to the governor. But in Volsk he met the local merchant and burgomaster Klimov, who persuaded Sergiy to wait for Zlobin's return from Astrakhan, who allegedly could settle the whole matter more quickly and simply. And although Sergiy feared that Zlobin would not go against his wife, he could not show such obvious inattention to the influential tax farmer and patiently waited for him from December 27 to February 12, 1797. Upon arrival, Zlobin indeed promised to help.

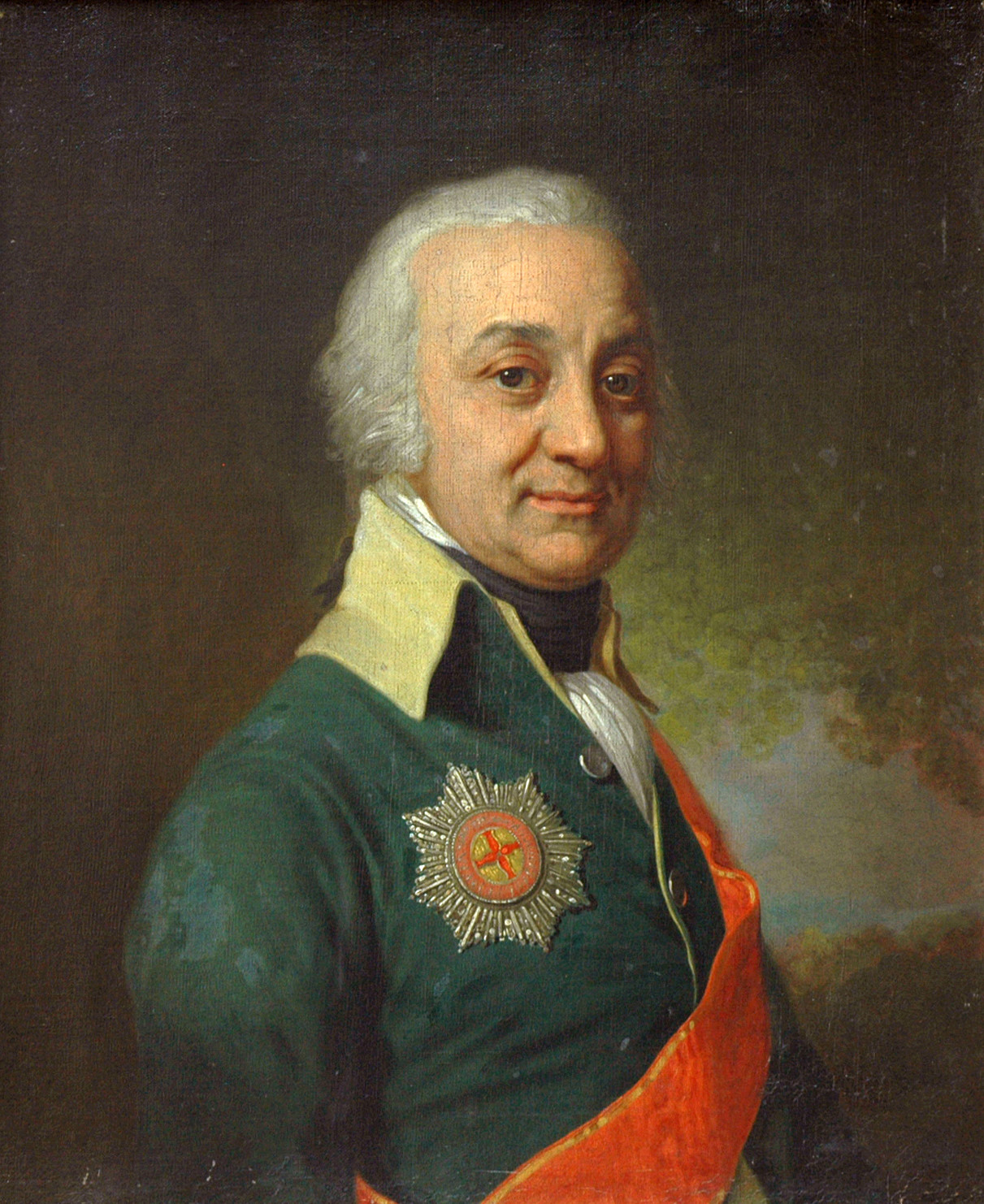
Portrait of Pavel Runich by V. L. Borovikovsky

On February 16, with a special commission from Emperor Paul I, Vladimir Governor Pavel Runich arrived in Volsk, who stayed at Zlobin's house. He visited the Lower Monastery, where they did not fail to complain about Sergiy that he was oppressing them in spiritual matters. In response, the elders were promised that everything would go on as before and Sergiy would do nothing to them. When in turn Sergiy wanted to complain to Runich about the opposition of the "monastic scum" to the highest command on joining Edinoverie, Zlobin dissuaded him, allegedly fearing that then not a stone would remain on a stone from the monastery, and "by neighborhood" it would fall on them. After Runich's departure, Zlobin advised Sergiy to go to Moscow, where at Easter the emperor would be with the senate and Synod. He even ordered the treasurer of the Dormition Monastery to issue Sergiy one hundred rubles of monastic money for the trip.

Upon Sergiy's return to the monastery, about 20 of his supporters from among the elders and lay brothers issued him a written power of attorney to the Kazan bishop to request the sending of hieromonks and hierodeacons. In Volsk, Epifanov, Sapozhnikov, and many others also gave him a written request to Ambrose for blessed priesthood. In Saratov, Sergiy met Zlobin and handed this request to him, after which he went to Moscow. In Moscow, Sergiy展开ed vigorous activity: he submitted a petition to the Synod and achieved that Metropolitan Gabriel sent a decree to the Tikhvin Monastery demanding the sending of a hieromonk and hierodeacon to the Upper Dormition Monastery. Upon Zlobin's arrival in the capital, Sergiy informed him of this; he thanked him, and after conversations with Ambrose and Gabriel promised to introduce Sergiy with the hieromonks into the monastery "without any grief on both sides".

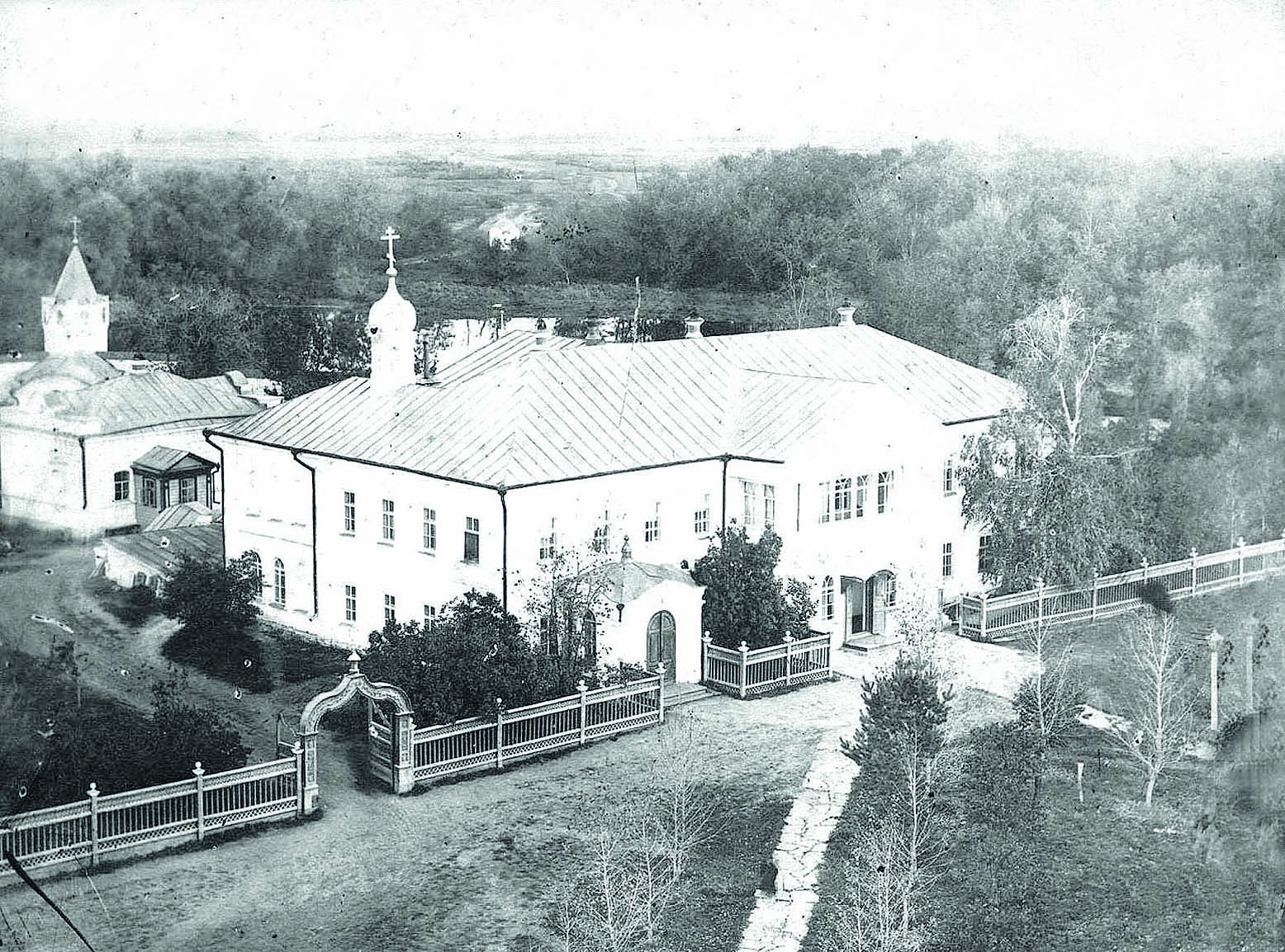
Upper Transfiguration Monastery

However, Sergiy did not suspect that he had long lost his main ally. Earlier, Zlobin still refused the idea of Edinoverie and agreed with the Old Believers that there should be no blessed priesthood on the Irgiz. Therefore, for some time he had not been helping but, on the contrary, harming Sergiy, though not showing it openly. He sent several merchants to Gabriel, who informed him that the hieromonks sent by him would not be accepted on the Irgiz. In addition, Zlobin allegedly did not manage to hand Ambrose the petition from the Volsk townspeople. Sergiy had to catch up with Ambrose in Kazan together with the Tikhvin monks. Zlobin wrote a letter to the archbishop, in which he asserted that upon returning from Moscow "I found the Dormition monastery all in disarray," the brethren do not wish to accept the builder with blessed priests, and even the surrounding villages are greatly embittered against the builder. The letter was clearly calculated so that Ambrose would be frightened and not let Sergiy go to the Irgiz, but it was delayed in transit, and on June 23 Sergiy arrived in Volsk, where Zlobin, demonstrating apparent joy at his arrival, simultaneously secretly sent a messenger to the monasteries with an order under no pretext to admit Sergiy. Some time later, the Volsk merchant Alexey Popov was officially sent to the monasteries with a written inquiry: are there any who agree with the builder. He brought back the answer that there were none: all who agreed with Sergiy, about twenty people, had been expelled from the monastery in advance. Four of the expelled elders came to Zlobin, whom they considered their ally. Further cooperating with both sides, Zlobin could not and finally frankly confessed to Sergiy: "do what you want, Father Sergiy, when there are no agreers in the monastery, then we have no business".

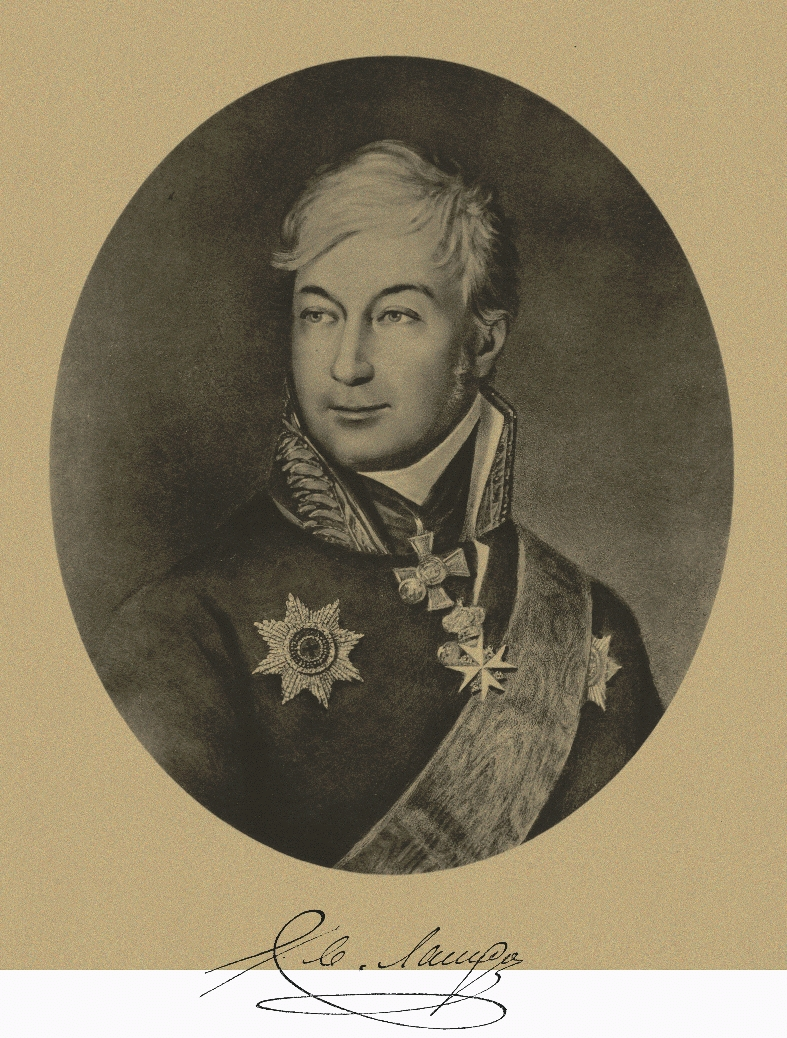
Vasily Lanskoy

Now the nearest hope was the governor Vasily Lanskoy, to whom Sergiy appealed for help, continuing to assert that many in the monastery support him but fear the current monastic leadership. The governor already knew in advance about all of Sergiy's misfortunes and satisfied his request, sending with him to the monastery the councilor of the governorate administration, Colonel Alexander Ivanchin, who set out on July 10. But Ivanchin did not help Sergiy: passing through Volsk, the colonel visited Zlobin and after receiving "signs of attention and gratitude" was not at all inclined to support Sergiy. As a result, the monks met Ivanchin with bread and salt, but did not even let Sergiy to come it to his locked cell.

In the end, Ivanchin advised Sergiy to leave the monastery. He had to obey. Together with the Tikhvin monks, Sergiy stayed in the monastery for only 9 and a half hours, after which he had to go back to Volsk.

Exasperated, Sergiy decided to fight the monastic brethren in another way; he filed a complaint with the Saratov governorate administration, stating that the monastery owed him 300 rubles in cash, plus 650 rubles of his own money had been invested in building cells. However, there were no documents for such debts of the monastery, and the threat of answer for false accusations hung over the former abbot. He had to ask the brethren to hush up the incident, simultaneously submitting a petition to the Volsk zemsky court for non-collection of this money from the monastery. In return, he had to give a subscription not to enter the monastery under any circumstances and no longer interfere in its spiritual affairs.

=== Later life ===
After such a promise, nothing held Sergiy in the Saratov Governorate anymore. Taking with him all his relatives, he went to Starodubye. There he officially accepted Edinoverie and together with his nephew entered the Nikodemov Monastery, arranging his sister and brother's wife with niece at the Edinoverie Transfiguration Church in Novozybkov. Soon he was ordained a hieromonk and became the abbot of the consenters' Dormition Monastery of the Novorossiya Diocese in Belarus.

In this post, he is remembered only for the publication in 1799 of the work Mirror for Old Believers Not Submitting to the Orthodox Church. His further fate did not attract the attention of historians and remained unknown.

== Religious works ==
Зеркало для старообрядцев, не покоряющихся православной церкви (1799 edition)

Sergiy's literary legacy consists of a series of literary labors. His Explanatory Discourse, Conciliar Consideration on the Answers of Abbot Anthony, Composition on the Fugitive Priesthood, Discourse from the Person of the Holy Church Builder Father Sergiy with Doubters on the Holy Church and Orthodox Priesthood consistently carry the idea of the necessity of re-anointing fugitive priests, while proving that their true correction is possible only where there is a holy church and holy chrism — in the Upper Dormition Monastery.

The Discourse of an Old Ritualist with a New Ritualist was written by Sergiy in 1782–1783. The composition is polemical in nature; it lists all the sins of Nikonism and collects all evidence in favor of Old Believerism, even evidence from ancient icons, and everything is said in defense of popovshchina. The composition is a dialogue in which the new ritualist provides replicas, and the Old Ritualist leads speeches, with the interlocutors not equal but rather in the position of student and teacher, who condescendingly explains to the student his delusions, instructs him, and even pretends to argue, while the new ritualist objects too weakly and agrees too quickly. The author's erudition, his experience in polemical affairs, and dexterity in selecting evidence were duly appreciated by the Old Believers. The main shortcoming of the composition, according to N. S. Sokolov, was the lack of an original idea, noting that the excessive use of earlier sources gives the composition a compilatory character, and accordingly affects the logical constructions, while positively evaluating the language of the work as very flexible and developed for its time.

In 1799, in Saint Petersburg, Sergiy's work Mirror for Old Believers Not Submitting to the Orthodox Church was published. According to Dobrotvorsky, this work served purely religious purposes aimed at demonstrating to the schismatics their delusions and rapprochement with Edinoverie in this way. Sokolov, however, believed that Sergiy, while still a schismatic, had seen similar books, knew the firmness and stubbornness of the schismatics, understood that a simple book would not convince them, and the Mirror was written as an apology of the author, an attempt to justify in the eyes of his former co-religionists his betrayal of former convictions. Any success for Orthodoxy from this composition among the Old Believers is unknown, but in 1860 it was even reprinted in Moscow.

== Influence ==
Despite Sergiy's expulsion from Irgiz, attempts to accept Edinoverie did not immediately cease. Volsk merchants Epifanov and Sapozhnikov, with the support of some other townspeople, whose number had decreased, undertook an attempt to introduce Edinoverie in Volsk, fulfilling the previous plan. At the end of 1797, they accepted a lawfully ordained priest. However, they were opposed, with Zlobin's support and his wife, by the custodian of the Old Believer chapel Pyotr Volkoynov, who managed to incite both in the city and in the surroundings the common people, who rose to defend the old rites. The innovators had to submit, and the acceptance of Edinoverie on the Irgiz was delayed by several decades.

However, Sergiy's attempt left a long memory in the popovtsy Old Believer milieu; for a long time his ideas caused ferment of minds, making the ghost of blessed priesthood the most terrible accusation. Suspicions of inclination to Nikonism henceforth were feared even by the most popular figures in the schismatic world, and even Prokhor Kalmykov himself was forced in 1825 to justify himself before accusers of "sophisticating against the Orthodox Church," sending to the Nicholas Monastery a written certificate of his Orthodoxy signed by the warden, treasurer, and conciliar elders — the memory of Sergiy was too strong.

== Bibliography ==
- "Сергий, раскольник" [Sergiy, the schismatic]. Brockhaus and Efron Encyclopedic Dictionary [Энциклопедический словарь Брокгауза и Ефрона] (in Russian). 1890–1907.
- Vorobyov, Mikhail (2002). Orthodox local history: Essays on the church history of Volsk and the Saratov region [Православное краеведение. Очерки церковной истории Вольска и Саратовского края] (in Russian). Moscow: Liniya Grafik. p. 196.
- Dobrotvorsky, I. M. (1857). "Historical information on the Irgiz pseudo-Old Ritualist monasteries before their conversion to Edinoverie" [Исторические сведения об Иргизских мнимостарообрядческих монастырях до обращения их к единоверию]. Orthodox Interlocutor [Православный собеседник] (in Russian). 2.
- Makary (1889). History of the Russian Schism, known under the name of Old Belief [История русского раскола, известного под именем старообрядства] (in Russian) (3rd ed.). St. Petersburg: (Unknown).
- Makary (1855). History of the Russian Schism, known under the name of Old Belief [История русского раскола, известного под именем старообрядства] (in Russian). St. Petersburg: (Unknown).
- Naumlyuk, A. A. (2009). The center of Old Belief on the Irgiz: emergence, activity, relations with the authorities [Центр старообрядчества на Иргизе: появление, деятельность, взаимоотношения с властью] (in Russian). Saratov: Nauchnaya Kniga. p. 100. ISBN 978-5-9758-1147-9.
- "On the permission for schismatics to leave and settle in Russia in the places indicated in the attached register (No. 11725, December 14, 1762)" [О позволении раскольникам выходить и селиться в России на местах означенных в прилагаемом у сего реестре (№ 11725, 14 декабря 1762)]. Complete Collection of Laws of the Russian Empire. First Collection [Полное собрание законов Российской Империи. Собрание Первое] (in Russian). Vol. XVI: June 28, 1762–1765. St. Petersburg: Typography of the II Department of His Imperial Majesty's Own Chancellery. 1830. p. 132.
- Popov, N. I. (1866). Collection for the history of Old Belief [Сборник для истории старообрядчества] (in Russian). Vol. 2. Moscow: (Unknown).
- Sergius (1799). Mirror for Old Believers not submitting to the Orthodox Church [Зеркало для старообрядцев не покоряющихся православной церкви] (in Russian). St. Petersburg.
- Sokolov, N. S. (1888). The Schism in the Saratov region: An attempt at research based on unpublished materials [Раскол в Саратовском крае. Опыт исследования по неизданным материалам] (in Russian). Saratov: (Unknown). p. 480.
- Theotoky, Nikifor (1834). Answers to 15 questions of the Irgiz schismatics and a discourse on holy chrism [Ответы на 15 вопросов иргизских раскольников и рассуждение о св. мире] (in Russian) (5th ed.). Moscow.
