= Daniil Mordovtsev =

Russian writer and historian (1830–1905)

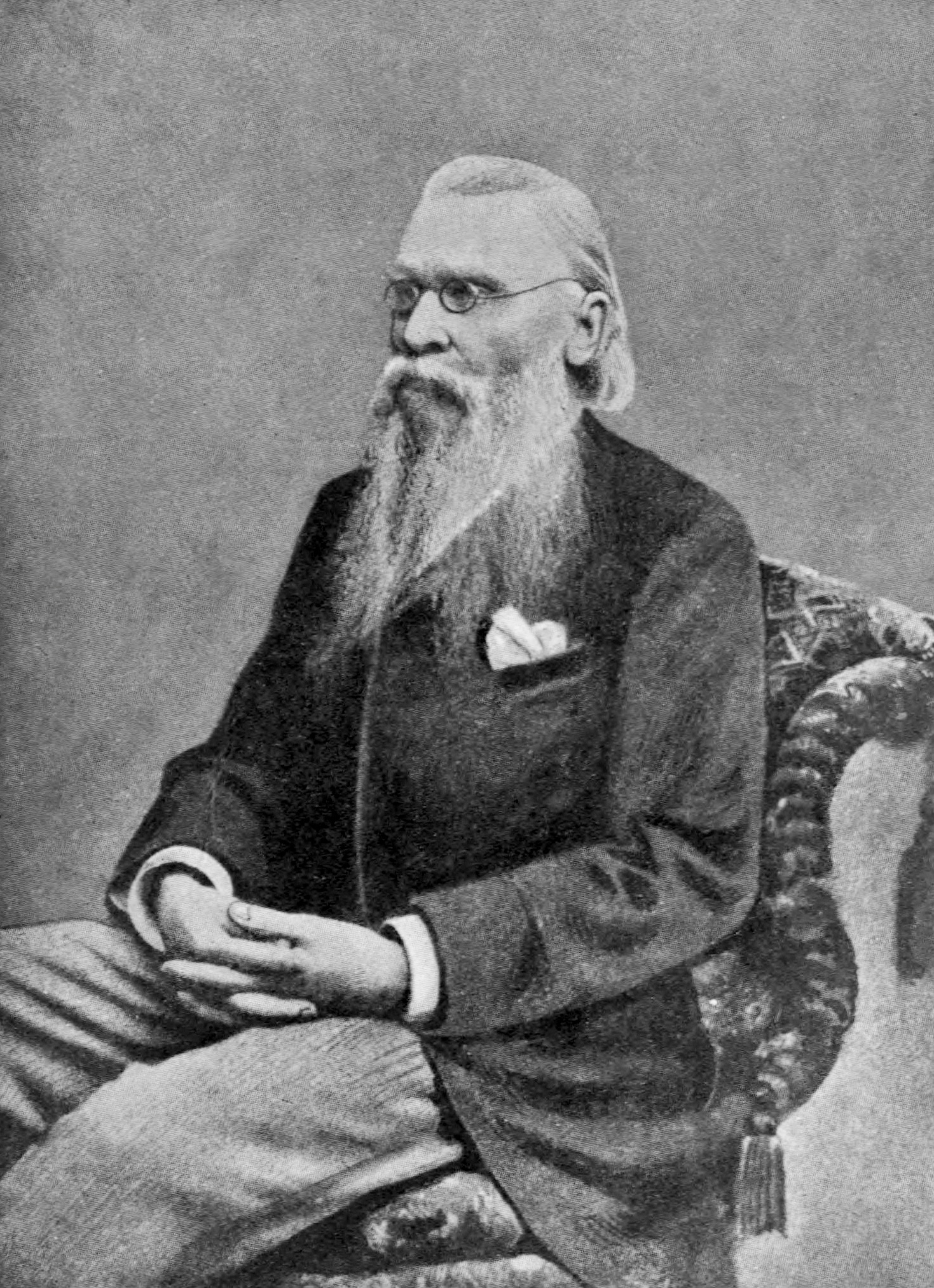
- Born: December 19, 1830; Don Host Oblast, Russia
- Died: June 23, 1905 (aged 74); Kislovodsk, Russia

Daniil Lukich Mordovtsev (Russian: Даниил Лукич Мордовцев; December 19, 1830 in Danilovka, Don Host Oblast, Russian Empire – June 23, 1905 in Kislovodsk, Russian Empire) was a Russian writer and historian.

== Biography ==
Mordovtsev was born in Danilovka, Volgograd Oblast, Russia. Mordovtsev's father was a Don Cossack and an estate manager. Mordovtsev spent his childhood in Don Host Oblast, where he learned in school. He graduated from the faculty of history and philology at St. Petersburg University in 1854.

Mordovtsev's literary debut came in the mid-1850s. His first work was the poem The Cossacks and the Sea (1854, published 1859). He began writing in Russian in the 1860s his first novels. His novella New Russian People (1868) dealt with the Narodniks and their cause, and with the position of raznochintsy intellectuals, as did the novel Signs of the Times (1869), although Mordovtsev did not share the views of the Narodniks. His historical novels were widely read; (The False Dmitry, 1879; Tsar Peter and the Regent Sophia, 1885; The Tsar and the Hetman, 1880; Lord Novgorod the Great, 1882; For Whose Sins?, 1890); these novels demonstrated Mordovtsev's democratic leanings. He served for more than thirty years as an official in Saratov and was the editor of the Saratov Provincial News. He contributed to several popular journals, including Russian Word, Notes of the Fatherland, and Affairs.

Mordovtsev also published many historical works, such as Impostors and the Freemen of the Lower Reaches (1867), The Haidamak Uprising (1870), Political Movements of the Russian People (2 vols, 1871), and On the Eve of Freedom (1872, published 1889), and his memoirs, From My Past and Experiences (1902, written in Ukrainian), in which he tells of his meetings with Taras Shevchenko and Nikolay Chernyshevsky. His historical works were received favorably in St. Petersburg academic circles, and he was even considered for a position on the faculty of St. Petersburg University.
