= Danilovsky District, Volgograd Oblast =

Danilovsky District Даниловский район (Russian)
- District
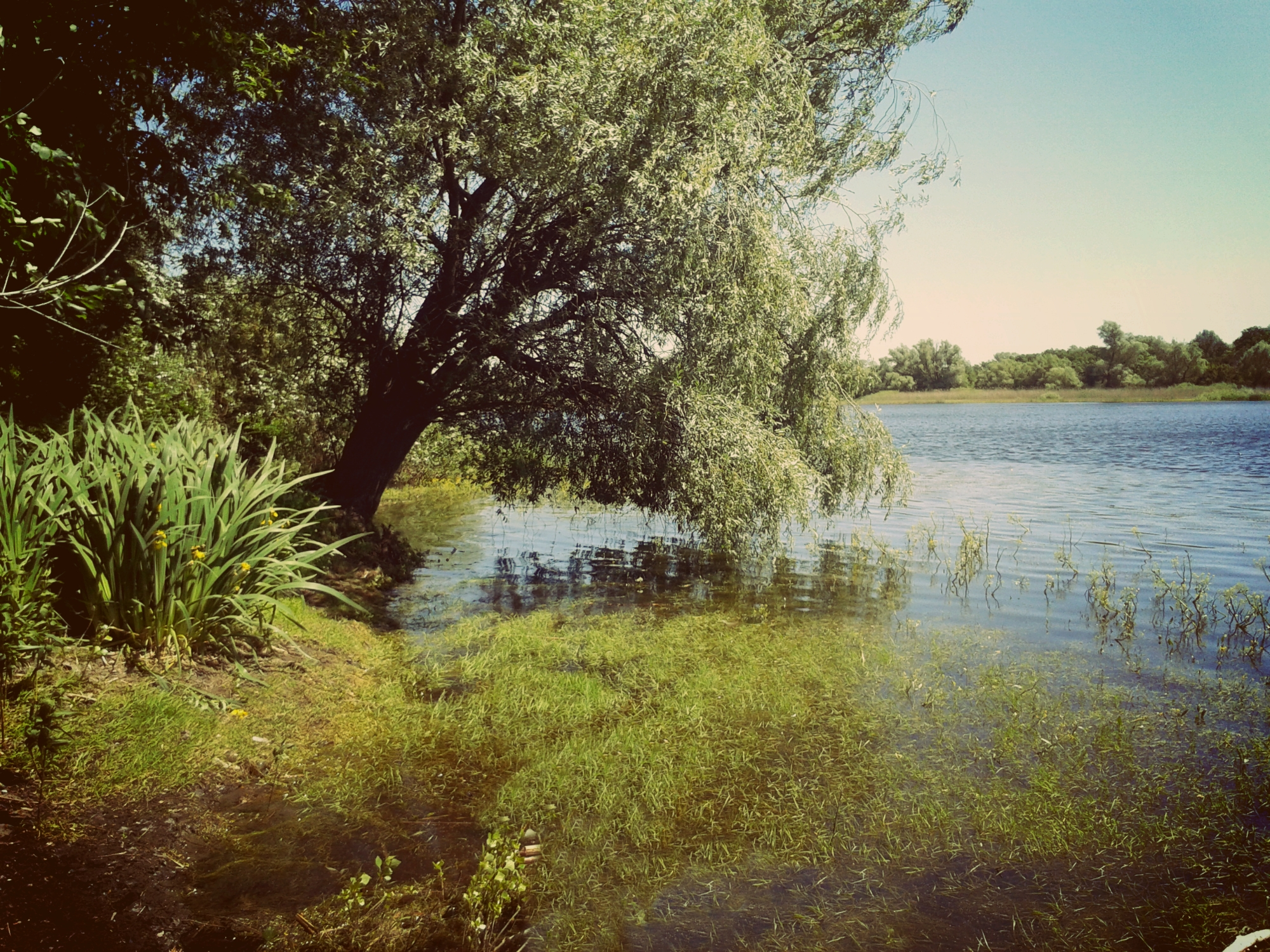
- Lake Ilmen in Danilovsky District

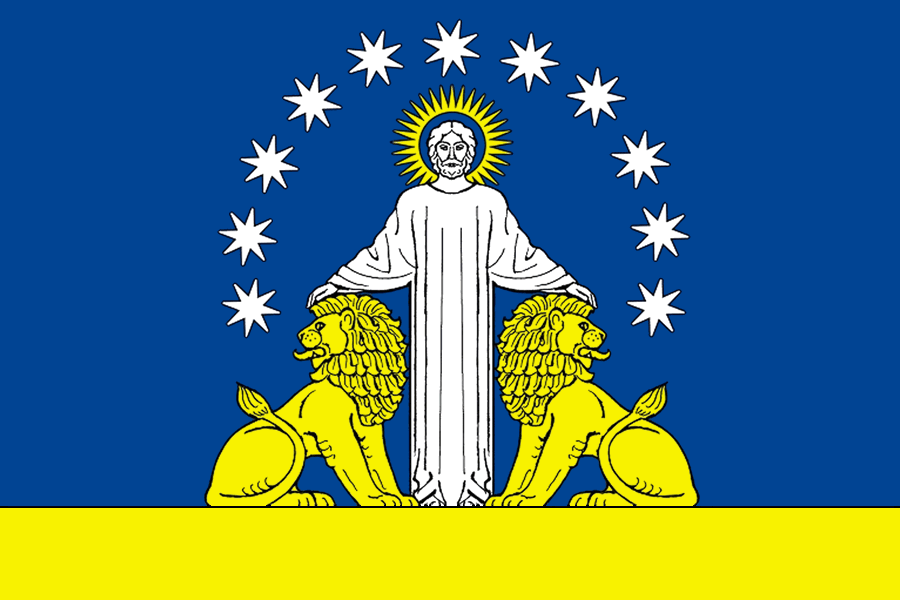
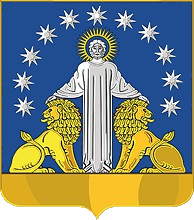
- Flag Coat of arms
- Location of Danilovsky District in Volgograd Oblast
- Coordinates: 50°17′N 42°11′E
- Country: Russia
- Federal subject: Volgograd Oblast
- Established: 23 June 1928
- Administrative center: Danilovka

Area
  - Total: 2,960.74 km^{2} (1,143.15 sq mi)

Population (2010 Census)
  - Total: 16,908
  - Density: 5.7107/km^{2} (14.791/sq mi)
  - Urban: 31.4%
  - Rural: 68.6%

Administrative structure
  - Administrative divisions: 1 Urban-type settlements, 11 Selsoviets
  - Inhabited localities: 1 urban-type settlements, 35 rural localities

Municipal structure
  - Municipally incorporated as: Danilovsky Municipal District
  - Municipal divisions: 1 urban settlements, 11 rural settlements
- Time zone: UTC+3 (MSK)
- OKTMO ID: 18606000
- Website: http://danilovskiy-mr.ru

Population of Danilovsky District
- 2010 Census: 16,908
- 2002 Census: 19,348
- 1989 Census: 20,859
- 1979 Census: 22,217

Danilovsky District (Russian: Дани́ловский райо́н) is an administrative district (raion), one of the thirty-three in Volgograd Oblast, Russia. As a municipal division, it is incorporated as Danilovsky Municipal District. It is located in the north of the oblast. The area of the district is 2,960.74 square kilometers (1,143.15 sq mi). Its administrative center is the urban locality (a work settlement) of Danilovka. As of the 2010 Census, the total population of the district was 16,908, with the population of Danilovka accounting for 31.4% of that number.
