= Danilovka, Volgograd Oblast =

Danilovka Даниловка
- Work settlement
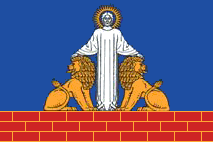
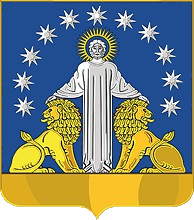
- Flag Coat of arms
- Interactive map of Danilovka
- Location of Danilovka Danilovka (Volgograd Oblast)
- Coordinates: 50°22′00″N 44°07′00″E
- Country: Russia
- Federal subject: Volgograd Oblast
- Administrative district: Danilovsky District

Population (2010 Census)
  - Total: 5,317
  - Estimate (2021): 4,308 (−19%)

Administrative status
  - Capital of: Danilovsky District
- Time zone: UTC+3 (MSK)
- Postal code: 403371
- OKTMO ID: 18606151051

Danilovka (Russian: Дани́ловка) is an urban locality (a work settlement) and the administrative center of Danilovsky District of Volgograd Oblast, Russia. Population: 5,317 (2010 census); 5,943 (2002 census); 5,518 (1989 Soviet census).
