= Tarasovo =

Tarasovo (Russian: Тарасово), rural localities in Russia, may refer to:

- Tarasovo, Kursk Oblast, a selo
- Tarasovo, Perm Krai, a village
- Tarasovo, Gryazovetsky District, Vologda Oblast, a village
- Tarasovo, Kichmengsko-Gorodetsky District, Vologda Oblast, a village
- Tarasovo, Nikolsky District, Vologda Oblast, a village
- Tarasovo, Plesetsky District, Arkhangelsk Oblast, a village
- Tarasovo, Vologodsky District, Vologda Oblast, a village
- Tarasovo, Volgograd Oblast, a selo

== See also ==
- Tarasov
