= Tarasov (disambiguation) =

Tarasov is a surname.

Tarasov or Tarasova may also refer to:

- Tarasov, Rostov Oblast, farmstead in Orlovsky District, Rostov Oblast, Russia
- Tarasov, Volgograd Oblast, farmstead in Ostrovskoye Rural Settlement, Danilovsky District, Volgograd Oblast, Russia
- Tarasova, a village in Solonceni Commune, Rezina district, Moldova
- Tarasova, Perm Krai, village in Perm Krai, Russia

== See also ==
- Tarasovka
- Tarasovo
