= Andrii Klantsa =

Ukrainian surgeon and politician

Andrii Ivanovych Klantsa
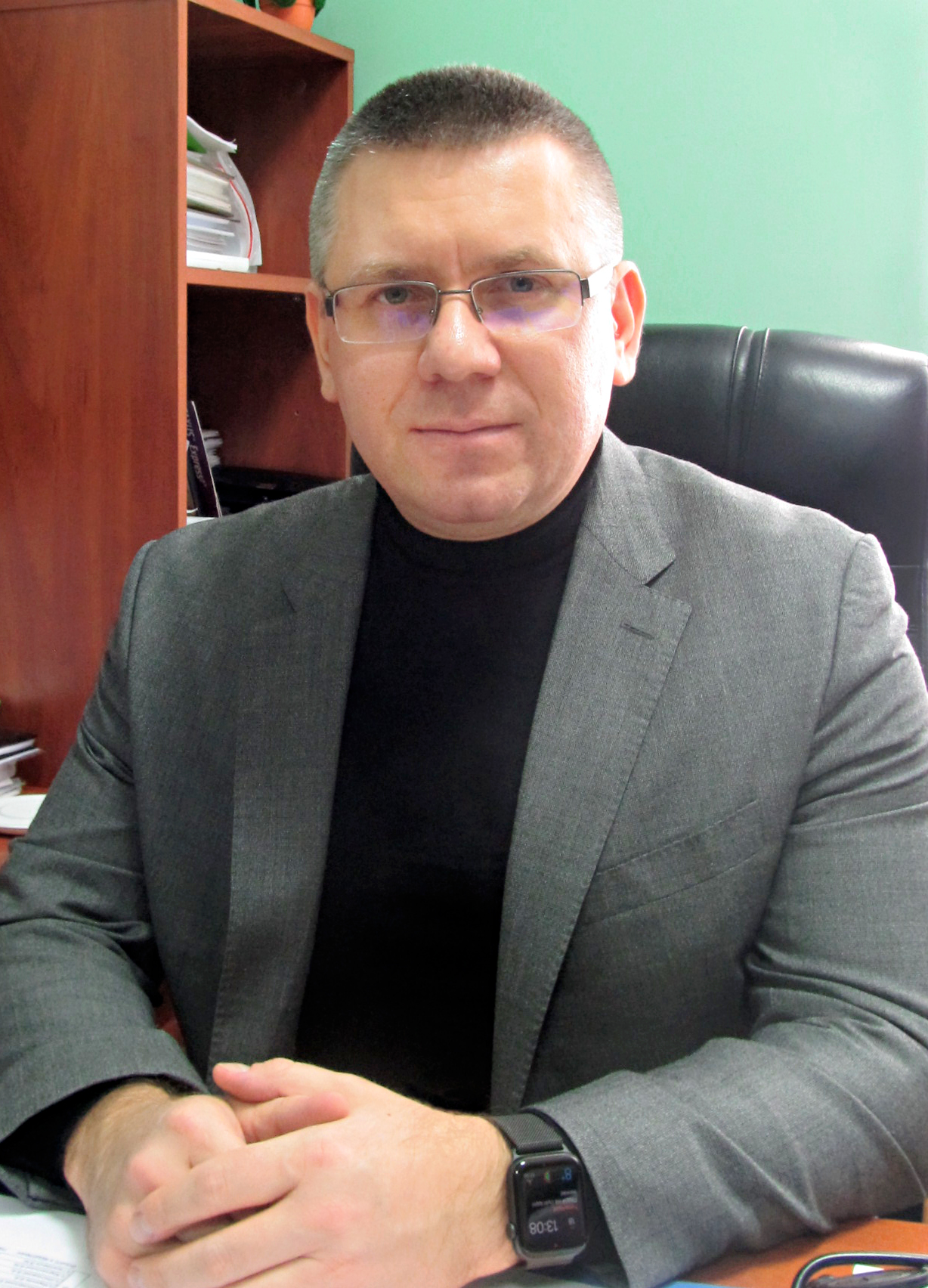
- Photo of Andrii Klantsa, 2020
- Born: 24 June 1980; Kamianets-Podilskyi, Khmelnytskyi Oblast, Ukraine
- Education: Bucovinian State Medical Academy, National Academy for Public Administration under the President of Ukraine
- Medical career
- Profession: Cardiac surgeon, organizer of health care
- Institutions: Khmelnytskyi regional cardiovascular center
- Sub-specialties: Cardiology
- Research: Acute mesenteric ischemia, cardiac activity in coronary artery bypass grafting

Andrii Ivanovych Klantsa (Ukrainian: Андрій Іванович Кланца, born 24 June 1980) is a Ukrainian cardiac surgeon and organizer of health care of the highest qualification category, scientist, Merited Doctor of Ukraine (2013), Doctor of Science in Public Administration, Candidate of Medicine, Director of Communal nonprofit enterprise Khmelnytskyi Regional Cardiovascular Center of Khmelnytskyi Oblast Council (2019), deputy of the Khmelnytskyi Oblast Council (2020).

== Biography ==
Klantsa was born on 24 June 1980 in Kamianets-Podilskyi, Khmelnytskyi Oblast, Ukraine. After completing the ninth grades of secondary school he entered Kamianets-Podilskyi Medical college. Then he was studying at the Bucovinian State Medical Academy, majoring in General Medicine, which he graduated with honors in 2002. He passed an internship in cardiac surgery at the Institute of Cardiovascular Surgery of the National Academy of Medical Sciences of Ukraine named after M.M. Amosov.

He started his career in 2004 as a cardiac surgeon at the Department of cardiac and endovascular surgery, interventional radiology of Khmelnytskyi Regional Hospital, and from 2007 to 2015 he was the head of this department.

2010–2013 - training at the National Academy for Public Administration under the President of Ukraine.

2015–2019 - Chief Doctor of Khmelnytskyi Regional Cardiology Dispensary.

In December 2019, he was elected as a director of the Khmelnytskyi Regional cardiovascular center of Khmelnytskyi Oblast Council.

In October 2020, he was elected a deputy of the Khmelnytskyi Oblast Council. As a deputy of the regional council, in August 2022 he was on a working visit to the State of Utah (United States) with the aim of establishing international cooperation regarding the support of Khmelnytskyi region during the war.

== Research activities ==
Main areas of research: development of effective treatment of acute mesenteric ischemia, investigation of hemodynamic aspects of cardiac activity in coronary artery bypass grafting, mechanisms of public administration in health care.

Annually he performs more than 500 surgical interventions on the heart of various degree of complexity (prosthetics of heart valves, prosthetics of the aorta, coronary bypass and stenting, implantation of artificial pacemaker). He was the first in the Khmelnytskyi region to perform coronary angiography and stenting, bypass of the vessels of the heart, prosthetics of the aorta, implantation of an artificial pacemaker.

In January 2022, together with colleagues, he performed the first heart transplant in Khmelnytskyi region

In addition to his scientific and practical activities, he is involved in the organization of health management in Khmelnytskyi, and he is a chief freelance cardiac surgeon of the Department of Health of Khmelnytskyi Regional State Administration, member of the board of the Association of Cardiovascular Surgeons of Ukraine. In 2013 he got a master's degree in Public Administration in Health Care, graduating from the National Academy for Public Administration under the President of Ukraine. In 2019 he defended his doctoral dissertation «Health care as a structural component of the national security of the state». He participates in roundtables of the Health Committee of the Ministry of Healthcare of Ukraine. He developed and implemented a regional program of assisting patients with acute coronary syndrome in the Khmelnytskyi region.

He is the author of numerous scientific works, rationalization proposals and patents for invention. His works are used and cited.

=== Selected works ===
- (2019) Healthcare as a structural component of the national security of the state. Manuscript
- (2018) The structural role of the state in the processes of health care and the provision of the national security system
- (2018) The main indicators of maintaining public health as a condition of the national security of the state
- (2018) Using of the 'warm blood cardioplegia in cardio valve replacement
- (2018) Demographic models of preserving public health and their impact on national security of the state
- (2018) Public health as a condition of national security of the state
- (2017) Human health and conservation options: Theoretical and methodological analysis
- (2017) The main models of public health as a condition of national security of the state
- (2017) Influence of health care system on formation (stable conditions of ensuring) of national security of the state
- (2017) Relationship between health protection of citizens and national security of the state: Methodology of the problem

== Awards and honors ==
Twice awarded the Diploma of the Verkhovna Rada of Ukraine (2008, 2016), Honorary Diploma of the Government of Ukraine (2020), Honorary Diploma of the Verkhovna Rada of Ukraine (2021), a medal named after M.M. Amosov of the National Academy of Medical Sciences of Ukraine (2018). He is Merited Doctor of Ukraine (2013), Candidate of Medicine (2007) and Doctor of Science in Public Administration (2019).
