= Taras (name) =

Taras (Ukrainian: Тарас) is a male given name especially popular in Ukraine. In Greek mythology, Taras (Ancient Greek: Τάρας) was the eponymous founder of the Greek colony of Taras (Tarentum, modern Taranto), in Magna Graecia (today South Italy). The name was later modified in Byzantium after Saint Tarasios (also Saint Tarasius; Greek: Ἅγιος Ταράσιος). Saint Tarasios's feast day is on the Calendar of Saints, celebrated on February 25 by the Eastern Orthodox and Ukrainian Greek-Catholic Church churches, and on February 18 by the Roman Catholic Church. (This date on the Julian Calendar at present corresponds to March 10 on the Gregorian calendar).

A common version is that the name Taras means "rebellious" from Greek word "rebellion" - ταραχή (tarahi), but this version is not confirmed. In Greece name Taras is practically unknown.

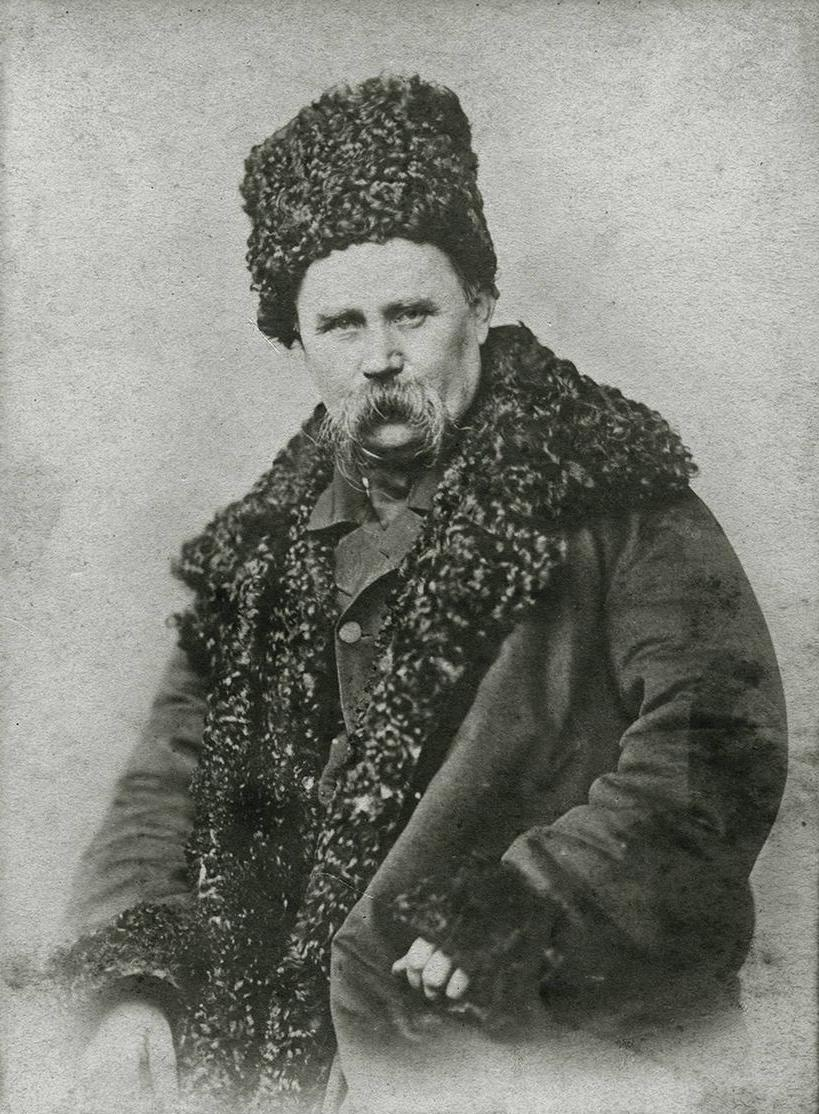
Taras Shevchenko. April 1859

The spread of the name in Ukraine is explained by its association with Taras Shevchenko, a national poet and unifying figure for the Ukrainian nation who was likely named after Saint Tarasios as he was born on March 9, 1814.

After Taras Shevchenko, naming your child Taras came to signify the allegiance to the national cause in a Ukrainian family. Notable people with the name include:

- Taras Bidenko (born 1980), a Ukrainian boxer
- Taras Bidiak (born 1945), a Canadian soccer player
- Taras Borodajkewycz (1902–1984), an Austrian economics historian
- Taras Borovets (1908–1981), a Ukrainian WWII insurgency leader
- Taras Mykolayovych Boychuk (born 1966), a Ukrainian scientist
- Taras Burlak (born 1990), a Russian footballer

- Taras Chopik (born 1972), a Ukrainian footballer
- Taras Chornovil (born 1964), a Ukrainian politician
- Taras Chubay (born 1970), a Ukrainian musician and poet

- Taras Danko (born 1980), a Ukrainian wrestler
- Taras Duray (born 1984), a Ukrainian footballer
- Taras Dutko, a Ukrainian paralympic footballer

- Taras Fedorovych (died c. 1636), a Cossack leader
- Taras Ferley (1882–1947), a Canadian publisher and politician
- Taras Filenko, a Ukrainian musician and academic
- Taras Foremsky (born 1980), a Canadian ice hockey player

- Taras Gabora (born 1932), a Canadian violinist
- Taras Grescoe (born 1966), a Canadian writer

- Taras Hunczak (born 1932), a Ukrainian-American academic
- Taras Hryb (1952–2021), a Canadian wrestler

- Taras Ilnytskyi (born 1983), a Ukrainian footballer

- Taras Kabanov (born 1981), a Ukrainian footballer
- Taras Karabin (born 1989), a Ukrainian footballer
- Taras Kermauner (1930–2008), a Slovenian author
- Taras Khtey (born 1982), a Russian volleyball player
- Taras Kiceniuk, Jr. (born 1954), an American hang glider
- Taras Kiktyov (1986–2012), a Ukrainian footballer
- Taras Kompanichenko (born 1969), a Ukrainian musician
- Taras Konoshchenko, a Ukrainian opera singer
- Taras Kostanchuk (born 1964), Ukrainian activist
- Taras Kozyra (born 1941), a Canadian politician
- Taras Kulakov (born 1987) also known as "CrazyRussianHacker", a Russian YouTuber.
- Taras Kuzio (born 1958), a British academic

- Taras Lazarovych (born 1982), a Ukrainian footballer
- Taras Lutsenko (born 1974), a Ukrainian footballer
- Taras Lyssenko (born 1960) of A and T Recovery, an American marine salvage expert of once lost US Navy World War II aircraft

- Taras Mychalewych (born 1945), a German artist
- Taras Mykhalyk (born 1983), a Ukrainian footballer

- Taras Natyshak (born 1977), a Canadian politician

- Taras Petrivskyi (born 1984), a Ukrainian footballer
- Taras Petrynenko (born 1953), a Ukrainian singer
- Taras Pinchuk (born 1989), a Ukrainian footballer
- Taras Protsyuk (1968–2003), a Ukrainian journalist
- Taras Puchkovskyi (born 1994), a Ukrainian footballer

- Taras Rajec (born 1988), a Ukrainian-born Slovak ice skater
- Taras Romanczuk (born 1991), a Ukrainian-born Polish footballer

- Taras Senkiv (born 1989), a Ukrainian luger
- Taras Shelest (born 1980), a Russian footballer
- Taras Shelestyuk (born 1985), a Ukrainian boxer
- Taras Shevchenko (1814–1861), a Ukrainian poet
- Taras Sokolyk, a Canadian politician and businessman
- Taras Stepanenko (born 1989), a Ukrainian footballer

- Taras Tsarikayev (born 1989), a Ukrainian footballer

- Taras Valko (born 1985), a Belarusian sprint canoer
- Taras Voznyak (born 1957), a Ukrainian writer and activist

- Taras Yastremskyy, a Ukrainian paralympic swimmer
- Taras Yavorskyi (born 1989), a Ukrainian footballer

- Taras Zaviyskyi (born 1995), a Ukrainian footballer
- Taras Zytynsky (born 1962), a Canadian ice hockey player

== Fictional characters ==
- Taras Bulba, the protagonist of Nikolai Gogol's 1835 novel of the same name
