= Tarasov =

Tarasov (Russian: Тарасов), Tarasoff (masculine), or Tarasova (feminine) is a Russian patronymic surname derived from the male given name Taras. Notable people with the surname include:

- Alexander Tarasov, Russian left-wing sociologist
- Alla Tarasova, Russian theater actress
- Anatoly Tarasov, ice hockey coach
- Artyom Tarasov, Russian businessman
- Boris Tarasov, Russian military officer
- Daniil Tarasov (disambiguation), several people
- Denis Tarasov, Russian Paralympic swimmer
- Dmitri Tarasov (footballer), Russian footballer
- Dmitri Tarasov (ice hockey), Russia ice hockey player
- Evgenia Tarasova, Russian figure skater
- Maksim Tarasov, pole vaulter
- Pyotr Tarasov, birth name of Petras Tarasenka (1892–1962), Lithuanian archaeologist
- Sergei Tarasov (biathlete), Russian biathlete
- Sofia Tarasova, Ukrainian singer
- Tatiana Tarasova, Russian figure skating coach
- Vladimir Tarasov, Russian director and animator

== Fictional characters ==
- Abram Tarasov, Iosef Tarasov, Viggo Tarasov, antagonists is John Wick

== See also ==
- Tarasoff v. Regents of the University of California (1976), a California Supreme Court decision
