= Taras Boychuk =

Ukrainian scientist (born 1966)

Taras Mykolayovych Boychuk
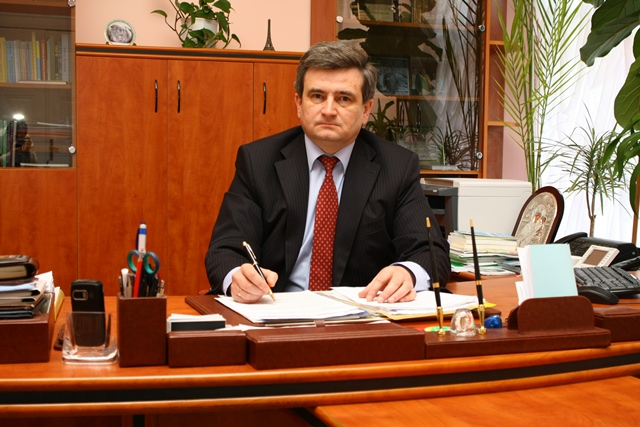
- Taras Mykolayovych Boychuk; Doctor of Science, Professor
- Born: 17 March 1966 (age 60); Lukavtsy, Vyzhnytsia District Chernivtsi Province
- Education: Bukovinian State Medical University
- Known for: Science works in Chronobiology, rector of Bukovinian State Medical University
- Scientific career
- Fields: Pathophysiology, Chronobiology
- Workplaces: Bukovinian State Medical University

Taras Mykolayovych Boychuk (Ukrainian: Тарас Миколайович Бойчук; born March 17, 1966, in the village of Lukavtsi in the Vyzhnytsia district of Chernivtsi) is a Ukrainian scientist in the field of chronobiology and chronotoxicology, Doctor of Medical Science (1999), Professor (2002), Rector of Bukovinian State Medical University (2010), President of the Association of Bukovinian State Medical University Graduates Association of Bukovinian State Medical University Graduates (2012), Academician of the Academy of Science of the Higher School of Ukraine (2010).

== Education and career ==
After initial graduation in 1989 from the Chernivtsi State Medical Institute, specialising in General Medicine, he went from being a senior laboratory assistant to being the head of the Water Hygiene and Water Reservoir Sanitary Control Laboratory, Medical-Ecological Problems Research Institute, a department of the Ministry of Public Health of Ukraine. After defending his Candidate's thesis in 1994, he was appointed to a position of an assistant. Later he became associate professor in the Department of Medical Biology and Genetics, a faculty of the Bukovinian State Medical Academy.

In 1999, he defended his Doctor's Thesis. In 2002, he was appointed to a chair of Professor. Since 2000 to 2003 he was the Dean of Pediatric and Medical Faculties at the Bukovinian State Medical Academy.

During 2004-2007 he worked at the Ministry of Public Health of Ukraine as the Deputy Chief, Education and Science Bureau, Department of Personnel Policy, Education and Science. In 2007, he was appointed the Rector of Kyiv Medical University, head of the Ukrainian Association of Folk Medicine, and Chief of the Department of Normal Physiology and Medical Biology.

On April 7, 2010, he was appointed acting Rector of Bukovinian State Medical University (BSMU) by the Ukrainian Ministry of Public Health.

On November 12, 2010, during the Conference of BSMU Works Meeting he was elected as the Rector of Bukovinian State Medical University.

Boychuk's research priorities are Chronobiology, Chronotoxicology, and Laser polarimetry of biological objects. He is the author of more than 164 scientific works, including 10 educational manuals and 8 monographs. He has supervised three Candidates of Science and one Doctor of Science. He is now a scientific adviser to three doctoral candidates and two postgraduates.

He is the chief editor of the scientific-practical journals "Clinical and Experimental Pathology","Bukovinian Medical Herald", and "Neonatology, Surgery and Perinatal Medicine".

== Awards ==
- Honourable Charter of the Ministry of Public Health of Ukraine (2000, 2005),
- Commendation of the Cabinet of Ministers of Ukraine (2004);
- Honourable Charter of the Ministry of Education and Science of Ukraine (2009),
- Y. Fedkovych Prize,
- Badge of Honour “For Education Development” (2009),
- Certificates of Chernivtsi Municipal Authority and Bukovinian State Medical Academy,
- B.L. Radzikhovsky Prize (2011); Omelian Popovych Prize (2011).

== Personal life ==
He is married to Iryna Boychuk, with one son, Igor.

== Sources ==
- Website of Bukovinian State Medical University
- Website of the Ministry of Public Health of Ukraine
- Scientific biographies of Ukrainian scientists on the website of the V.I.Vernadsky National Ukrainian Library
