= Tarasovo, Gryazovetsky District, Vologda Oblast =

Tarasovo Тарасово
- Village
- Location within Vologda Oblast Location within Russia
- Coordinates: 58°48′N 41°03′E
- Country: Russia
- Region: Vologda Oblast
- District: Gryazovetsky District
- Time zone: UTC+3:00

Tarasovo (Russian: Тарасово) is a rural locality (a village) in Vokhtozhskoye Rural Settlement, Gryazovetsky District, Vologda Oblast, Russia. The population was 135 as of 2002.

== Geography ==
Tarasovo is located 57 km southeast of Gryazovets (the district's administrative centre) by road. Vokhtoga is the nearest rural locality.
