= Taras Foremsky =

Canadian ice hockey forward

- Born: February 15, 1980 (age 45); Calgary, Alberta, Canada
- Height: 6 ft 1 in (185 cm)
- Weight: 200 lb (91 kg; 14 st 4 lb)
- Position: Right Wing/Center
- Shot: Left
- Played for: Pensacola Ice Pilots; Hassfurt ERC; San Angelo Saints; Fort Worth Brahmas; Torino Bulls; Flint Generals; Jacksonville Barracudas; Memphis Riverkings; Peterborough Phantoms; Guildford Flames
- Playing career: 2002–2009

Taras Foremsky (born February 15, 1980) is a Canadian retired ice hockey forward.

== Junior and college ==
Foremsky began his hockey career in his local league, the Alberta Junior Hockey League (AJHL), where he spent three seasons plying his trade with four different teams putting up 212 points. The 2001–02 season was a bleak one for Foremsky only playing 10 games for Merrimack College of the NCAA. One year on and Foremsky had joined up with the Mount Royal College Cougars of the Alberta College's Athletic Hockey Conference (ACAC) posting 70 points in 28 games for the Cougars, leading the league in points, being picked for the first all-star team, receiving League MVP and setting a new league record for goals in a season.

== Going pro ==
At the end of the successful 2002–03 season Foremsky was given a short-term contract with the Pensacola Ice Pilots of the ECHL grabbing 1+3 from 6 regular season games. The following years were uncertain for Foremsky, who represented 7 teams in 3 seasons, starting with Hassfurt in Germany before moving back to North America and the CHL with San Angelo and Fort Worth. The 2004/05 season was more successful than those that it had proceeded, with Foremsky suiting up for the Torino Bulls of the Serie A, for whom he finished 2nd in goals, assists, points and penalty minutes for the team. The 2005/06 season was again unsettled, with Foremsky playing in the UHL (Flint Generals), SPHL (Jacksonville Barracudas) and CHL (Memphis Riverkings).

== Move to the U.K. ==
In 2006 Foremsky arrived in Peterborough to play for the Phantoms where he set the league alight scoring 136 points in 48 games, somehow finding time to rack up 102 penalty minutes. Foremsky also dominated the play-offs scoring 17 points in 7 games. His end of season plaudits included, top points scorer in EPL, top points scorer in League, Cup and Play-offs for Peterborough and selected for the EPL All-Star 1st Line 2006/07. It seemed as though the good times were going to keep on rolling for Taras and the Phantoms with Foremsky scoring 34 points in the first 14 games. But after a mid-game, dressing room dispute with head coach Phil David, Foremsky left through 'mutual consent'. Although it did not take long for Foremsky to attract interest from other clubs and was snapped up by eventual regular season champions Guildford Flames on November 10. Foremsky got off to a slow start at the Flames, finding it hard to gel with line mates, but once he found his mark he quickly established himself as a fan-favourite and was instrumental in the Flames regular season championship title. He scored 22+33 in 34 regular season games, being voted Supporters Club Player of the Year, an extrodinary achievement considering he missed over 2 months of the Flames season. Foremsky then re-signed for another year with Guildford in early May. After another slow start to the season Foremsky's production picked up as the months progressed but missed out on games due to the Flames carrying an extra import. Despite this Foremsky finished the season as the team's highest goal scorer on 33 goals. This was enough to earn him a second supporters club player of the year award from the fans. With major changes on the way in the summer the Flames were going to rebuild, where at this point led Foremsky to the decision to retire to run his family's butcher shop in Canada.

=== Playing record ===
Year by Year Record

Includes Play-Offs

Note: GP = Games played; G = Goals; A = Assists; Pts = Points; PIM = Penalty Minutes. All Stats from either Peterborough Phantoms' or Guildford Flames' websites

Club	Year	League	GP	G	A	Pts	PIM
Crowsnest Pass	1998-99	AJHL	??	25	27	52	??
Crowsnest Pass	1999-00	AJHL	??	10	13	23	??
Bow Valley Eagles	1999-00	AJHL	57	34	32	66	132
Calgary Canucks	2000–2001	AJHL	32	18	31	49	68
Fort Saskatchewan	2000-01	AJHL	13	9	13	22	10
Merrimack College	2001-02	NCAA	10	0	1	1	0
Mount Royal College	2002-03	ACAC	28	38	32	70	44
Pensacola Ice Pilots	2002-03	ECHL	10	3	1	4	8
Hassfurt ERC	2003-04	GerOb	18	10	6	16	80
San Angelo Saints	2003-04	CHL	9	1	1	2	6
Fort Worth Brahmas	2003-04	CHL	20	3	5	8	6
Torino Bulls	2004-05	Serie A	34	10	12	22	55
Flint Generals	2005-06	UHL	12	2	0	2	6
Jacksonville Barracudas	2005-06	SPHL	17	5	14	19	12
Memphis Riverkings	2005-06	CHL	31	5	8	13	22
Peterborough Phantoms	2006-07	EPL	55	55	98	143	126
Peterborough Phantoms	2007-08	EPL	14	10	24	34	41
Guildford Flames	2007-08	EPL	40	27	39	66	51
Guildford Flames	2008-09	EPL	53	33	37	70	78
Totals (Multiple Seasons)			GP	G	A	Pts.	PiMs
AJHL Totals			-	96	116	212	-
CHL Totals			60	9	14	23	34
EPL Totals			152	125	198	323	296
