= Tarasovo, Plesetsky District, Arkhangelsk Oblast =

Tarasovo Тарасово
- Village
- Location within Arkhangelsk Oblast Location within Russia
- Coordinates: 62°25′N 39°50′E
- Country: Russia
- Region: Arkhangelsk Oblast
- District: Plesetsky District
- Time zone: UTC+3:00

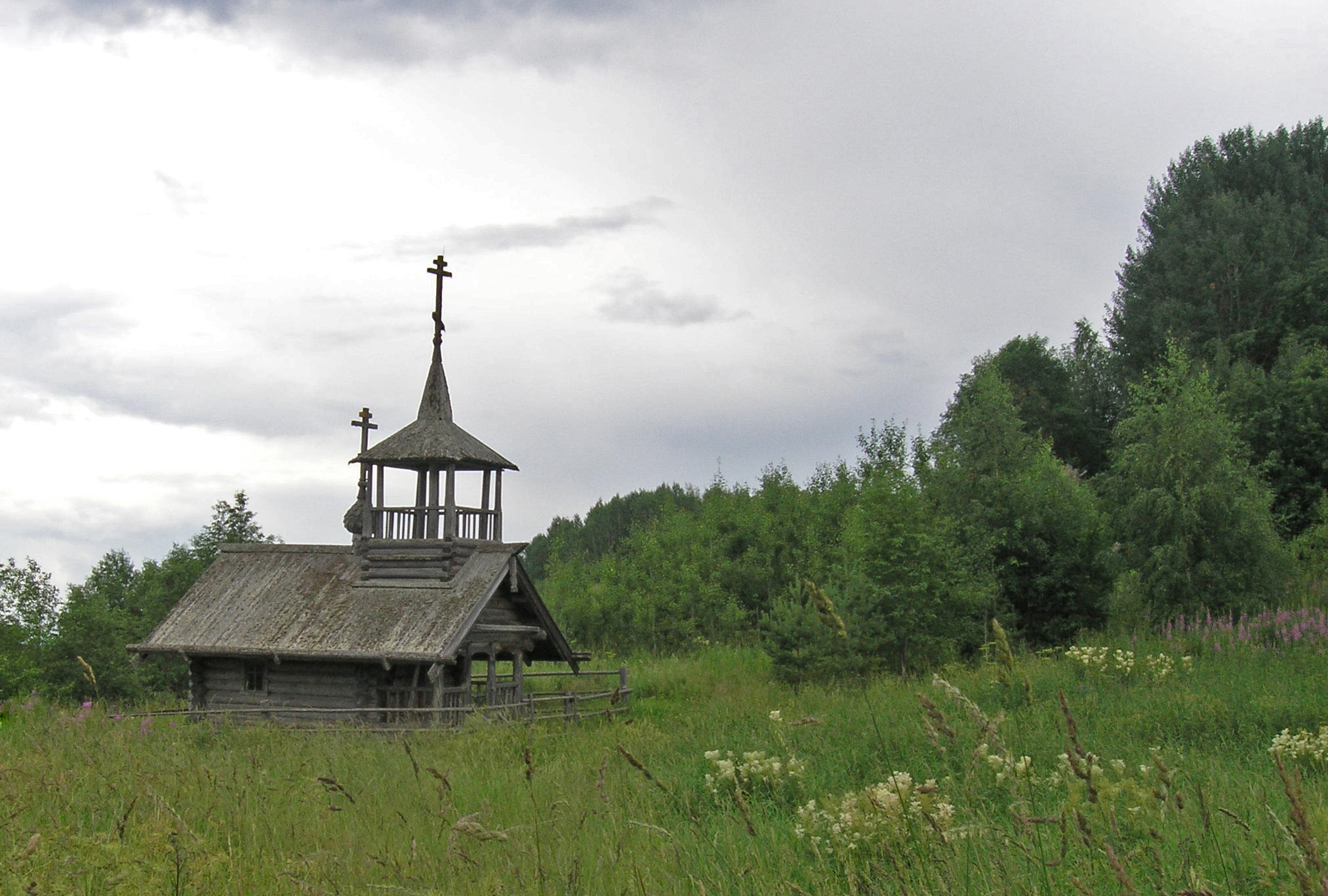
Chapel of St. Athanasius (Arkhangelsk Region, Tarasovo)

Tarasovo (Russian: Тарасово) is a rural locality (a village) in Plesetsky District, Arkhangelsk Oblast, Russia. The population was 1 as of 2010.

== Geography ==
Tarasovo is located 50 km southwest of Plesetsk (the district's administrative centre) by road. Zakumikhinskaya is the nearest rural locality.
