= Tarasovo, Kichmengsko-Gorodetsky District, Vologda Oblast =

Tarasovo Тарасово
- Village
- Location within Vologda Oblast Location within Russia
- Coordinates: 60°07′N 46°18′E
- Country: Russia
- Region: Vologda Oblast
- District: Kichmengsko-Gorodetsky District
- Time zone: UTC+3:00

Tarasovo (Russian: Тарасово) is a rural locality (a village) in Kichmegnskoye Rural Settlement, Kichmengsko-Gorodetsky District, Vologda Oblast, Russia. The population was 13 as of 2002.

== Geography ==
Tarasovo is located 39 km northeast of Kichmengsky Gorodok (the district's administrative centre) by road. Podvolochye is the nearest rural locality.
