= Bukovinian State Medical University =

Public university in Chernivtsi, Ukraine

- Буковинський державний медичний університет
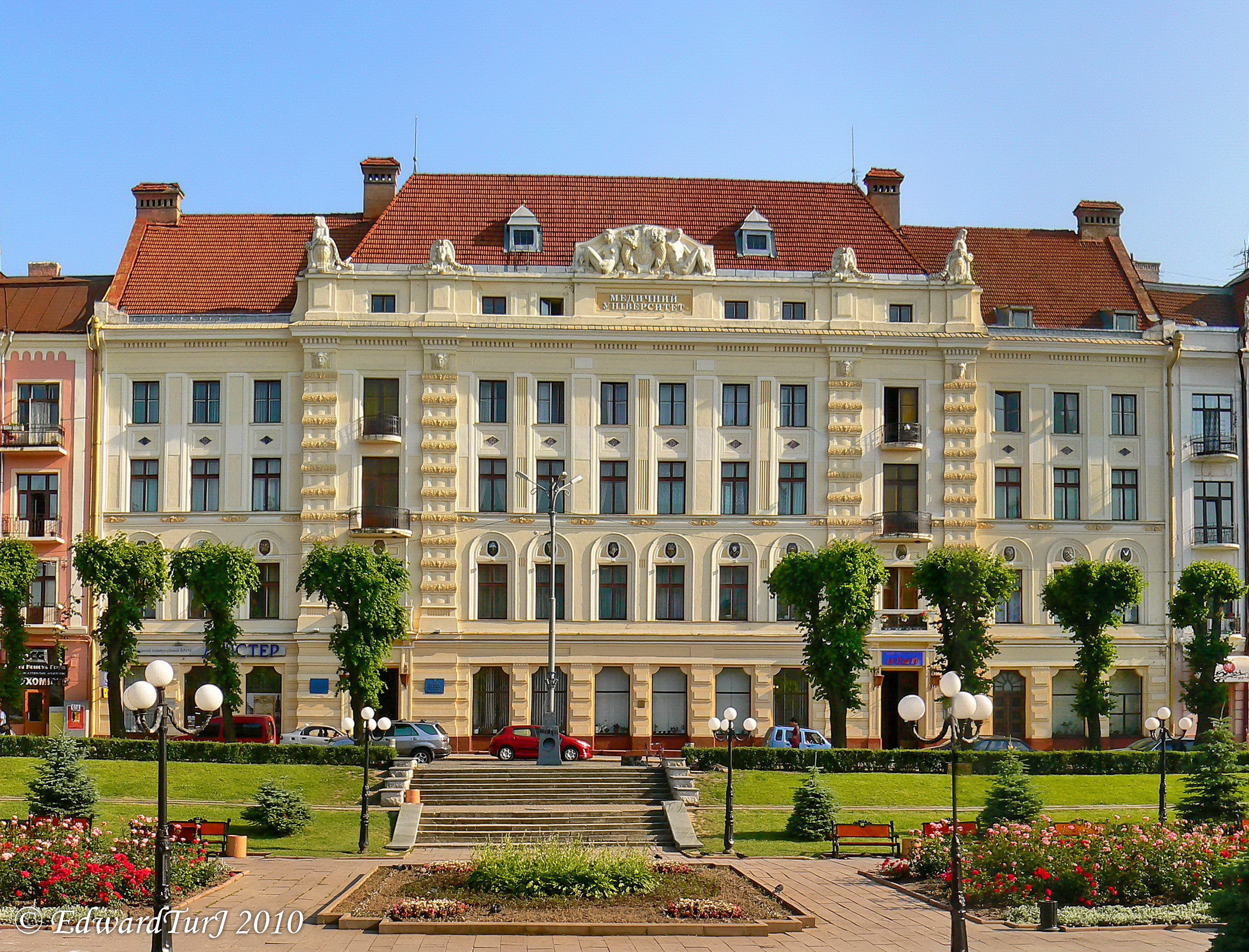
- Other name: BSMU
- Motto: Salus populi – suprema lex
- Motto in English: The people's health is the highest law
- Type: Public university
- Established: 1944
- Accreditation: Ministry of Education and Science of Ukraine (highest level)
- Affiliations: Ministry of Health of Ukraine
- Academic affiliations: European Universities Association
- Rector: Ihor Gerush (acting)
- Academic staff: 85 (2022)
- Administrative staff: 1406 (2018)
- Students: 5284 (including foreign citizens — 1934, October 2021)
- Postgraduates: 80 (2021)
- Doctoral students: 3 (2018)
- Location: Chernivtsi, Ukraine; 48.2914°N 25.9322°E
- Campus: Urban
- Website: www.bsmu.edu.ua

Immovable Monument of Local Significance of Ukraine
- Official name: Адміністративний корпус медичного інституту (Палата буковинських ремесел) (Administrative building of the Medical Institute (Chamber of Bukovina Crafts))
- Type: Architecture
- Reference no.: 2784-Чв

The Bukovinian State Medical University (Ukrainian: Буковинський державний медичний університет) is a public medical university of IV level of accreditation in Chernivtsi, Ukraine. It offers over 90 degree programs and has 49 departments in 6 undergraduate, graduate, and postgraduate faculties. BSMU is a member of the European University Association and is a signatory of the Magna Charta Universitatum.

The university was established in 1944, on the basis of Kyiv State Medical Institute, as Chernivtsi State Medical Institute. It was reorganized into its current form in 2005. In addition to the main campus in Chernivtsi, the university operates three preparatory departments in Chernivtsi, Novoselytsia and Vashkivtsi and a recreational complex in Repuzhyntsi.

== History ==
In October 1944 the Second Kyiv State Medical Institute was transferred for further work to the city of Chernivtsi. Without receiving a new name, the capital institute relocated to Chernivtsi continued to operate for a month and a half as the 2nd Kyiv State Medical Institute in Chernivtsi. Only at the end of November 1944 the 2nd Kyiv State Medical Institute was given the name "Chernivtsi State Medical Institute".

Bukovinian State Medical University (BGMU) was created by reorganization of the Bukovinian State Medical Academy on the basis of the Order of Cabinet of Ministers of Ukraine from 02.03.2005 46-p and Order of the Ministry of Health of Ukraine from 15.03.2005 110 "About reorganization of the Bukovinian State Medical Academy.

Academy (BGMA) was created according to the Decree of KMU from 04.04.1997 312 on the base of Chernivtsi State Medical Institute (CMI) which was founded in 1944 and functioned till April 1997. Chernivtsi State Medical Institute was founded on 20 October 1944 based on 2nd Kyiv Medical Institute after its redeployment to Chernivtsi city.

In 2014 the Bukovinian State Medical University celebrated its 70th anniversary, and in 2011 the university celebrated its 80th anniversary as a higher educational institution.

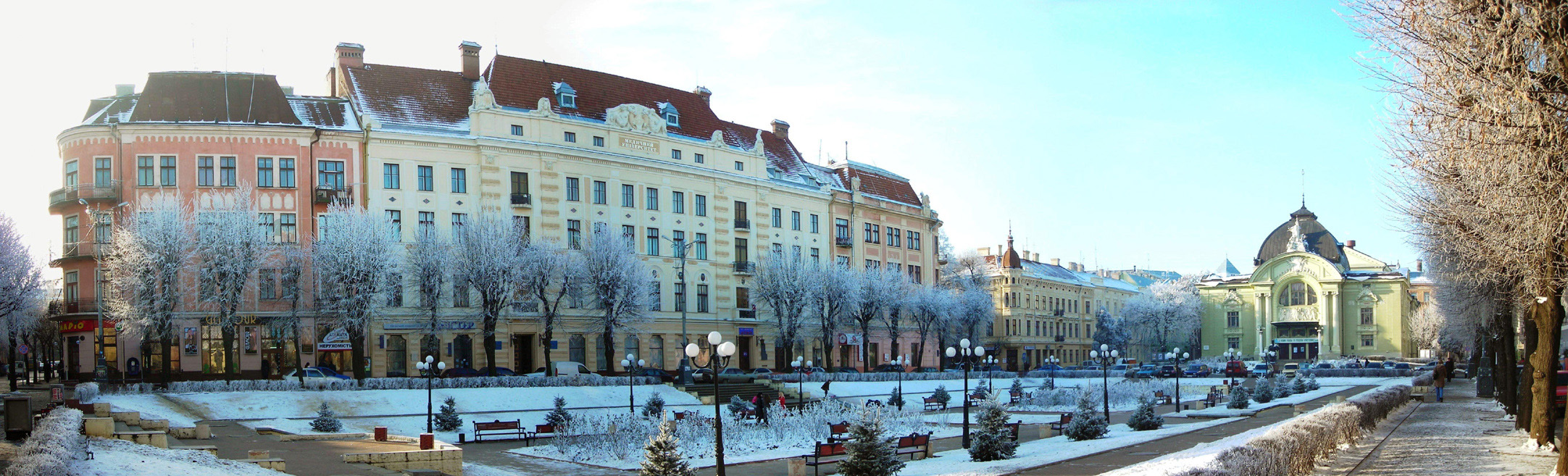
Chernivtsi Theater Square, administrative building of BSMU

== Rectors ==
The history of Bukovina is closely connected with the names of the rectors of the medical institution, famous professors - D. S. Lovlia (1945-1951), M. B. Mankovsky (1951-1954), M. M. Kovalev (1954-1963), O. D. Yuhimets (1963-1974), V. K. Patratij (1974-1993), V. P. Pishak (1993-2010), T. M. Boychuk (from 2010 to 2020) In 2021, the planned rector election did not take place. O. A. Andriets was acting as rector in 2021–2023.

== University authority ==
- Acting Rector – Gerush Igor Vasiliovych, Candidate of Medical Science, Associate Professor
- Vice-rector for Scientific and Pedagogical Work - Khodorovskyi Volodymyr Mykhailovych, Associate Professor
- Vice-rector for Scientific-Pedagogical and Therapeutic Activity - Ilashchuk Tetiana Oleksandrivna, Doctor of Medical Sciences, professor
- Vice-rector for Scientific and Pedagogical Work and Education - Zoryi Nina Ivanivna, Candidate of Philosophical Science, associate professor
- Vice-Rector on Scientific and Pedagogical Work and International Relations Grytsyuk Marjana Ivanivna , M.D., Doctor of medical sciences, Professor
- Educational and Research Institute of Postgraduate Education Director, MD, Associate Professor Bambulyak Andriy Vasyliovych

== Teaching staff ==
The personnel potential of the university is unique, it is staffed today by professionals in their field, who have exceptional teaching skills: 115 doctors of medical sciences and 429 candidates of medical sciences, among them 1 member-correspondent of Academy of Medical Sciences of Ukraine, 2 academicians of Academy of Medical Sciences of Ukraine, 6 academicians of Ukrainian Academy of Medical Sciences, 9 honored workers of Ukraine, 2 honored workers of national education and higher school of Ukraine, 85 professors, 269 associate professors. 52 employees of clinical chairs of BSMU are provincial freelance specialists and consultants of DOH of Chernivtsi Regional State Administration.

== Campuses and buildings ==
The university has 15 educational buildings, a modern library, an ultra-modern simulation centre, university dental centre, educational-productive chemist's, sport complex, the Palace of culture and rest "Academichny": a theatre, summer camp "Zdorovya". Clinical departments are located on the bases of 33 medical-preventive and pharmaceutical establishments of Chernivtsi.

== Education of foreign citizens ==
Today the university has 5181 students including 1727 foreign citizens from 32 countries. The training of foreign citizens has been carried out since 1994, and since 2004 the training of foreign students in English was started. The number of foreign students from India, Somalia, Nigeria, Ghana, Pakistan, Ethiopia, Sudan, Saudi Arabia, Bulgaria, USA and other countries studying at Bukovinian State Medical University increases year by year.

== Departments and courses ==
Department	Academic title	Head of department
Obstetrics and gynecology	Professor	Yuzko Oleksandr Mykhailovych
Obstetrics, gynecology and perinatology	Professor	Kravchenko Olena Viktorivna
Human anatomy named after M.G. Turkevych	Professor	Kryvetskyi Viktor Vasyliovych
Anatomy, clinical anatomy and operative surgery	Professor	Slobodyan Oleksandr Mykolayovych
Anesthesiology and resuscitation	Professor	Konovchuk Viktor Mykolaiovych
Bioorganic and biologic chemistry and clinical biochemistry	Assoc. Professor	Grygoryeva Nadiya Pylypivna
Biological physics and medical informatics	Professor	Fediv Volodymyr Ivanovych
Internal medicine	Professor	Fediv Oleksandr Ivanovych
Internal medicine, clinical harmacology and occupational diseases	Professor	Khukhlina Oksana Sviatoslavivna
Internal medicine, physical rehabilitation and sports medicine	Professor, Honored Physician of Ukraine	Tashchuk Viktor Korniiovych
Hygiene and ecology	Professor	Vlasyk Leonid Ivanovych
Histology, cytology and embryology	Professor	Tsygykalo Oleksandr Vitaliyovych
Dermatovenerology	Professor	Denysenko Olha Ivanivna
Pediatric surgery and otorhinolaryngology	Professor	Bodnar Oleg Borysovych
Nursing and higher nursing education	Professor	Plesh Igor Antonovych
General surgery	Professor	Poliovyi Viktor Pavlovych
Foreign languages	Assoc. Professor	Rak Oleksandr Mykhailovych
Infectious diseases and epidemiology	Professor	Moskaliuk Vasyl Deoniziiovych
Clinical immunology, allergology and endocrinology	Professor	Pashkovska Nataliia Viktorivna
Disaster medicine and military medicine	Assoc. Professor	Biryuk Igor Hrygorovych
Medical biology and genetics	Professor	Bulyk Roman Yevhenovych
Medical and pharmaceutical chemistry	Professor	Bratenko Mykhailo Kalininovych
Microbiology and virology	Professor	Deyneka Svyatoslav Yevhenovych
Nervous diseases, psychiatry and medical psychology named after s.m. savenko	Professor	Pashkovskyi Valerii Melentiiovych
Oncology and radiology	Assoc. Professor	Bodyaka Volodymyr Yuriyovych
Orthopedic dentistry	Professor	Bielikov Oleksandr Borysovych
Ophthalmology named after b.l. Radzichovskyi	Professor	Penishkevych Yaroslav Ivanovych
Pathologic physiology	Professor	Rohovyi Yurii Yevhenovych
Pathologic anatomy	Professor	Davydenko Igor Sviatoslavovych
Pediatrics, neonatology and perinatal medicine	Professor	Nechytailo Yurii Mykolaiovych
Pediatrics and children's infectious diseases	Professor	Koloskova Olena Kostiantynivna
Pediatrics and medical genetics	Professor	Sokolnik Snizhana Vasylivna
Propaedeutics of internal medicine	Professor	Ilashchuk Tetiana Oleksandrivna
Psychology and philosophy	Professor	Borysyuk Alla Stepanivna
Family medicine	Professor	Sydorchuk Larysa Petrivna
Social medicine and health organization	Assoc. Professor	Navchuk Ihor Vasylovych
Dentistry of childhood	Professor	Godovanets Oksana Ivanivna
Forensic medicine and medical law	Professor, Honored Physician of Ukraine	Bachynskyi Viktor Teodosiiovych
Social sciences and ukrainian studies	Professor	Moisey Anoniy Arkadiyovych
Therapeutic dentistry	Professor, Honored Physician of Ukraine	Batig Victor Markiyanovych
Traumatology and ortopedics	Professor	Vasiuk Volodymyr Leonidovych
Urology and neurosurgery	Professor, Honored Physician of Ukraine	Fedoruk Oleksandr Stepanovych
Pharmacology	Professor	Zamorskyi Igor Ivanovych
Pharmaceutical botany and pharmacognosy	Professor	Zakharchuk Oleksandr Ivanovych
Pharmacy	Assoc. Professor	Gerush Oleg Vasyliovych
Physiology named after Ya.D. Kirshenblat	Professor	Tkachuk Svitlana Serhiivna
Phthisiology and pulmonology	Professor	Todoriko Liliia Dmytrivna
Surgery № 1	Professor, Honored Physician of Ukraine	Polianskyi Igor Yuliiovych
Surgery № 2	Professor, Honored Physician of Ukraine	Shkvarkovskyi Igor Volodymyrovych
Surgical dentistry and maxillofacial surgery	Professor	Kuzniak Nataliia Bohdanivna
Course (as a part of the corresponding department)
Ear, nose, throat diseases	Assoc. Professor	Plaksyvyi Oleksandr Hrygorovych
Physical education and health	Senior teacher	Kulish Natalia Mykolajivna

== Divisions ==
The university consists of:

Teaching, educational and support units:

- Educational department with information and analytical sector;

- Educational and methodological office;

- Students' office;

- Department of practical training;

- Department of international relations;

- Editorial and publishing department;

- Historical and medical museum of the university.

Scientific divisions:

- Scientific and medical department [Archived 5 May 2022 at the Wayback Machine]; with the sector of innovational development;

- Department of doctoral studies, postgraduate studies, master's studies and clinical residency;

- Department of metrological and technical support; - Research laboratories (22);

- Vivarium.

Administrative and economic units:

- Rector's office;

- Personnel department;

- Planning and economic department;

- Accounting department;

- Chancellery;

- Archive;

- Civil defense headquarters;

- Department for occupational safety and health;

- Legal service;

- Economic division with departments of chief power engineer, chief mechanic, material and technical supply, utility department;

- Educational buildings (13);

- Hostels (5).

Other subdivisions of the University:

- Palace of Culture and Recreation "Academichnyi";

- Recreation center in Repuzhyntsi village, Zastavna district, Chernivtsi region.

Some departments have the following subdivisions:

- Medical and Psychological Center [Archived April 8, 2022 in the Wayback Machine] (at the S. M. Savenko Department of Nervous Diseases, Psychiatry and Medical Psychology);

- Sports club (at the Department of Disaster Medicine, Military Medicine with a course of physical education and health);

- Educational and methodical center of newborn resuscitation and modern perinatal technologies (at the Department of Obstetrics, Gynecology and Perinatology).

== Educational-recreational complex in the village of Repuzhyntsi, Zastavna District ==
On the Bank of the Dniester River near the village of Repuzhintsy, Zastavnivsky district, Chernivtsi region (70 km from the city of Chernivtsi), there is a sports and recreation camp for students and university staff for 250 vacationers. The health camp was founded in 1958 on the initiative of the then head of the Department of Physical Education Konstantin Vladimirovich Mironov. For the first time, the Camp accepted students and employees of the then Chernivtsi Medical Institute on vacation in 1958. Vacationers were placed only in tents provided by the military unit, with which the Medical Institute maintained close patronage relations. Only the dining room was located in a wooden house. In the early 60s, at the initiative of the rector of the Institute A. D. Yukhimets, brick and wooden cottages, pavilions for board games, a summer theater, and sports grounds were built for vacationers of various types. In the 60s, the famous satirist people's artist of the USSR Arkady Raikin liked to relax in the institute's camp. Currently, the Recreation Center "Zdorovye"/»Health», on the Dniester River, with restored, overhauled, equipped with modern furniture cottages hospitably receive visitors — guests, students and employees of the university. Traditionally, at the Recreation Center "Zdorovye"/»Health», the medical and psychological center of Bukovinian State Medical University conducts psychological intensive courses that invite everyone. The intensive courses feature the best Ukrainian and foreign trainers, various areas of psychotherapy, trainings, psychological games, master classes. The place gives a proven opportunity to find friends, colleagues and partners, interesting and fun leisure time.

== Organization of the educational process ==
The main goal of educational and methodical work at the university is to create conditions that contribute to improving the efficiency and quality of the educational process. Academic and methodological work is managed by the university's educational department. Methodological work at the university is a set of measures aimed at:- providing the educational process with educational and methodological documentation;- improving the pedagogical skills of teachers, improving classroom and independent work of students;- improvement of all forms, types and methods of educational work at the university, taking into account the state and prospects for the development of medical organizations and institutions for which the university trains specialists. Disciplines, courses at the university are taught in accordance with the working curricula of the disciplines. The content of work programs meets the requirements of educational and professional programs and standard training programs approved by the Central Methodological Commission for Higher Medical Education of the Ministry of Health of Ukraine. The formed programs provide a systematic approach, in the process of which each discipline is studied not as an independent and independent one, but as part of a system aimed at training a specialist of a certain profile. End-to-end programs for mastering practical skills in all disciplines have been introduced into the educational process. The system of training specialists at the university meets the requirements of the current branch standards of Higher Education. Taking into account the professional and active principle of organizing training at the university, the availability, creation and replication of textbooks, guidelines and textbooks plays an important role. The departments have prepared and published guidelines for practical classes and independent training of students with algorithms for consistent mastery of practical skills, knowledge, skills, training and teaching aids. Training at Bukovinian State Medical University is carried out according to a credit-modular system, in accordance with the requirements of the Bologna Process. The credit-modular system for assessing students ' knowledge and skills has been applied for 6 years. The university has a mandatory system for monitoring the preparation of students and the quality of training (certification with test primary and exit levels, rating control). It includes: daily (test, oral, written, computer) control of the preparation of students of the academic group in each lesson (100%); boundary control of the assimilation of individual sections of the program; certification of students every month from the beginning of each semester with the determination of the average (rating) grade in each discipline; final test (exam) of preparation control. A mandatory element of training in clinical departments and conducting exams at them is the assessment of mastering practical skills and solving situational problems, which is regarded as an algorithm of a doctor's activity for a specific, specific situation and a specific sick person. The university departments have compiled software packages, test sets and questions of varying complexity that are used at different stages of monitoring student training, which are placed on the Moodle Distance Learning Server for ease of study.

== Scientific activity ==
Scientific publications

- Bukovina medical bulletin

Problematics-promotion of achievements of medical science in Ukraine in the fields of Fundamental Sciences, internal, pediatric and surgical diseases, obstetrics and gynecology, healthcare organization.Address in scientific periodicals of Ukraine

Scientific schools

Therapeutic school

Pediatric school

Surgical school

Pharmaceutical school

Outstanding scientists of the university

- Boris Radzikhovsky-ophthalmologist, professor at the Chernivtsi Medical Institute since 1945.
- Roman Lev-Professor, Head of the Department of hospital surgery.
- Sergey Savenko-neurologist, university professor since 1945

== Medical and preventive activity ==
All practicals are held in classrooms and labs of the university, in therapeutic-prophylactic establishments and in sanitary-epidemiological stations of the town and region. Powerful potential of the professional staff of clinical departments includes 42 Professors, 48 Doctors of Medical Science, 187 Associate Professors (with academic status) and 321 Candidates of Medical Science. 166 workers of the staff have higher medical qualifying degree, 54 of them have obtained I category, 48 – II category. 32 workers of the clinical departments of BSMU are non-staff specialists and work as consulting physicians of Chernivtsi Regional Executive Board. Clinical departments of BSMU are located in 27 clinical centers: 17 therapeutic establishments of a regional subordinate and 10 – of a municipal one. According to their schedules, professors and associate professors make clinical ward rounds, consulting visits at polyclinics, examinations of patients in the inpatient departments of therapeutic-prophylactic establishments. A great deal of methodological organizing work is carried out: visit of therapeutic preventive establishments, review of the patients' histories, participation in the boards of experts and qualifying committee, conference conducting etc. Considerable therapeutic-prophylactic work is held by teachers during summer practice. Various and manifold therapeutic consulting activity in the system of Bukovina practical health service is carried out by the assistants of clinical departments. Except consultations this activity includes arrangement of all qualifying means for physicians of practical health service in the following spheres – subject mastering, reevaluating courses, lectures on actual topics, arrangement and conducting of science-practical conferences, working out of methodological recommendations, and expert evaluation of patients' management. The important part in cooperation of the university clinical workers and physicians of practical health service is devoted to consulting and science-methodological work in therapeutic-prophylactic establishments of health service.

More than 30 establishments are used for students' medical practical work. Among them there are military hospital A1028, SES of Lviv railway, Chernivtsi regional clinical hospital, Chernivtsi regional children's clinical hospital N1, Chernivtsi regional children's clinical hospital N2, Emergency Rescue Clinical Municipal Hospital, Regional children's clinical hospital, Maternity Home N1 and N2 of Chernivtsi. Some students have their practical training in the places of their residence.

In order to improve their knowledge in appropriate specialty, students are suggested to master their practical skills in specialized pediatric, therapeutic and surgical departments which are located in basic clinical establishments (casualty department, anesthesiology and resuscitation unit and traumatological, neurosurgical, endocrine, neurological departments). Modern methods of patient's examination are mastered by students in Regional Medical Diagnostic Centre of Chernivtsi, rooms of endoscopy and ultrasonic investigation and in specialized X-ray departments.

== International activity ==
The department of international contacts, created on October 29, 2003, by the Rector's order on the basis of corresponding documents of the Ministry of Public Health Service, is involved in international contacts. The work of international department is managed by the pro-rector on scientific work and international contacts Ivashchuk Aleksander Ivanovych. The activity of the university is directed to the development, extension and strengthening of international contacts and BSMU authority in the world cooperation. International cooperation constantly improves. Bukovinian State Medical University collaborates with: Klagenfurt Hospital (Austria), Belarusian State Medical University (Minsk), Grodno State Medical University, Vitebsk State Medical University (Belarus), Karlovy University, Prague (Czech Republic), the University of Montpellier (France), University of Lubeck, Karl-Garus University of Technology, Dresden, Humboldt University, Berlin, University of Konstanz, University of Cologne, Kuilnsky University, Liverpool John Moores University (Great Britain), Akmolinsk State Medical Academy (Kazakhstan), Pedagogical State University, Kyshyniv, Mykola Testemitsanu State Medical and Pharmaceutical University, Kyshyniv, "Shtefan chel Mare" University, Suchava, T.G.Shevchenko Prydniprovsky State University, Tyraspol (Moldova), Lomonosov State University (Moscow), Russian State Medical University, Moscow, Russian University of People's Friendship, Moscow, St.Petersburg institute of Bioregulation and Gerontology, Burdenko Medical Academy, Sechenov Moscow Medical Academy, Urals State Medical Academy, Yekaterinburg (Russia), Medical University (Warsaw), University Collegium Medicum im. Ludvika Rydygiera, Bydgoshch, the University of Zheshov, Jagiellonian University, Krakov, the University of Medical Sciences, Poznan, Medical University, Lublin (Poland), "1 December 1918" University, Alba Iulia, Babeș-Bolyai University, Cluj-Napoca, University of Medine and Pharmacy "Victor Babes", Timișoara (Romania), Alexander Dubcek-University, Trencin, Pavol Jozef Safarik University, Kosice (Slovakiya), Angelholm Hospital (Sweden), University of Lucerne (Switzerland), Neurological Hospital, USA Utah Valley State University, University of the State of New-York, Olbani, King's University School of Medicine, Solomon IslNDS, MEDU International, Inc." Palo Alto, California (USA). Trips for Bachelors, holders of Master's degree, post-graduates are ensured by "Druzi" association (Ukraine-France) and the Centre of international contacts, State of California (USA). Every year students, new doctors and scientists of the university take part in international medical conferences, congresses, symposia and forums in the cities and towns of Poland, United States, Russia, Germany, Austria, Sweden, etc. The number of foreign students from India, Somali, Nigeria, Ghana, Pakistan, Ethiopia, Sudan, USA and other countries, who study in Bukovinian State Medical University, increase from year to year.

== Buildings and campuses ==
The university has 13 academic buildings, a modern library, a University Dental Center, an educational and industrial pharmacy, a sports complex, the Academic Palace of Culture and Recreation, and the "Zdorovye"/"Health" Recreation Center. Clinical departments are based in 27 medical, preventive and pharmacy institutions in Chernivtsi, which are provided with modern equipment. Educational laboratories, classrooms as well as their equipment meet a modern level and are provided with the necessary furniture, technical means in volumes and quantities that meet the requirements for organizing the educational process, scientific, medical and consulting work.

== Material and technical base ==
The material and technical base of the university allows to carry out the educational process, scientific and medical work at a modern level in accordance with the requirements of standards for training specialists and providing medical care. The university has 15 academic buildings, its clinical departments are based in 33 medical and preventive institutions in Chernivtsi, which are provided with modern equipment. The total area of the premises is 65,553 m2, and the area of educational premises for the educational process is 26,694 m2.Classrooms are provided with the appropriate amount of furniture, boards and other necessary equipment. Educational premises where applicants for higher education are trained comply with existing construction and sanitary standards, safety requirements, and existing labor protection standards. Workplaces of scientific, pedagogical and support staff are equipped with modern furniture, computers, office equipment and other necessary equipment. In the educational premises there is a significant amount of equipment to ensure clarity of teaching disciplines, including anatomical models, wet drugs, dummies, simulators, simulators, medical and diagnostic equipment (microscopes, biochemical analyzers, devices for ultrasound diagnostics, X-ray diagnostics, ECG and echocardiography, functional diagnostics, endoscopy, etc.). In order to provide high-quality practical training for applicants for higher education in the field of knowledge 22 Healthcare, the university has created a training center for simulation medicine with a total area of 800 m2, which is equipped with modern training dummies and simulation robots. In order to improve the training of future dentists, a modern Dental Phantom Class has been created, which is equipped with 14 doctor's workplaces, which are equipped with a micromotor, micromotor and turbine tips, a photopolymer lamp, a clean water system, a dental lamp, an ergonomic chair and a monitor. The university has about 300 pieces of multimedia equipment, including about 130 multimedia projectors and 80 liquid crystal televisions, 7 interactive whiteboards. The availability of multimedia equipment for simultaneous use in classrooms is more than 63.6%. Computer technology is widely used in the educational process at departments. The university has 17 computer classes that are used for teaching disciplines, conducting practical classes, testing, studying electronic textbooks and manuals, broadcasting surgical interventions on-line, etc. The university has almost 1,100 computers. The university has an Academic Palace with 700 seats, which provides excellent conditions for holding diverse student evenings, art events, creative meetings, and classes in amateur art circles. The university has a historical and medical museum, which is located in the building of the Academic Palace. BSMU has created all conditions for sports and recreation of students. The BSMU Sports Complex includes 9 specialized sports halls with a total area of more than 1000 m2. There are sports and recreation sections for students, teachers and staff in volleyball, basketball, table tennis, chess, tourism, athletics, athleticism, judo, wrestling, Sambo, calanetics, aerobics. In summer, students have a rest in the summer sports and recreation camp of Repuzhintsy Village, Zastavnivsky district, Chernivtsi region, where entertainment and sports competitions and themed holidays are held. The university has 8 dormitories, which are designed for 2,812 beds. They are equipped with necessary furniture, soft equipment, showers, laundries, hygiene rooms, etc.

== Student self-government ==
Student self-government bodies are created and operate at the university in the form of student course bureaus, student deans ' offices of faculties, student councils of dormitories, and the Student Council of the university. Decisions of student self-government bodies are advisory in nature. The highest body of student self-government in BSMU is the conference of university students. One delegate from 12 students is selected for the conference. Student conference:

- adopts regulations on student self-government;
- elects the executive body — the Student Council of the university and hears a report on its activities;
- determines the structure, powers and procedure for electing the Student Council of the university, its term of office.

In its activities, the Student Council of the university is guided by the legislation, decisions of the Ministry of Education and Science and the Ministry of Health of Ukraine, the Charter of BSMU. Student self-government in BSMU is carried out at the level of the student group, course, faculty, hostel, university. The main tasks of student self-government bodies are:

- ensuring and protecting the rights and interests of students, in particular, in relation to the organization of the educational process;
- ensuring that students fulfill their duties;
- promotion of students ' academic, scientific and creative activities;
- promoting the creation of appropriate living and recreation conditions for students;
- promotion of the activities of student circles, societies, associations, interest clubs;
- Organization of cooperation with students of other higher educational institutions and youth organizations;
- promotion of employment of graduates;
- participation in international student exchange issues;
- promotion of sociological research among students.

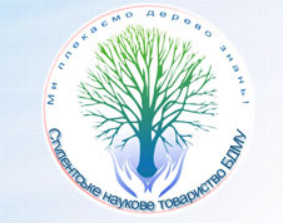
Students' Scientific Society Logo

=== Students Scientific Society (SSS) ===
The student scientific society (SSS) was established more than 60 years ago, a few years after the creation of the Chernivtsi Medical Institute (now Bukovinian State Medical University). From the very beginning, the society was a voluntary organization that plans and carries out its work under the leadership of the Scientific Department of the university. Since its foundation, the scientific society has been working in the following areas:

- assistance in organizing student research circles;
- comprehensive support of students ' scientific activities and ensuring an increase in the level of research;
- involvement of students in direct participation in research work at the university departments;
- participation in organizing and holding scientific forums and congresses, scientific and practical conferences and symposia, student subject Olympiads and competitions, as well as seminars and exhibitions;
- establishing international relations and cooperation with educational and research institutions, public and state organizations of Ukraine and other countries.

The second flourishing of the scientific society occurs in the nineties, and is due to the development of democracy in the country. The society's activities have always been coordinated by the best university teachers. From 1995 to 2001, the Council of young scientists and the work of the SSS was headed by candidate of Medical Sciences, Associate Professor of the Department of Medical Biology and Genetics Taras Boychuk. During 2001–2008, Igor Ivanovich Zamorsky, doctor of Medical Sciences, Professor, Head of the Department of Pharmacology, was the chairman of the Council of young scientists and scientific director of the SSS. In 2008, Doctor of medical sciences, professor of the Department of Cardiology, rehabilitation, physical therapy and sports medicine Tatyana A. Ilashchuk also performed the SSS duties. Since 2009, the work of the SSS and young scientists has been coordinated by candidate of Medical Sciences, Associate Professor of the Department of Medical Biology, Genetics and Histology Larisa Fedonyuk. During its activity, the SSS of BSMU has adequately represented the university at scientific events not only in Ukraine, but also far beyond its borders. The culmination of the organizational activity of the SSS Council and the daily hard work of students-Circle members is the final scientific conference. It has come a long way from the usual annual forum of students and young scientists of the university, first to the All-Ukrainian student conference with international participation, and then (since 2004) to an international conference. In 2009, the conference was first included in the Register of scientific congresses, congresses, symposia and scientific and practical conferences. Not only the geography of the conference, which currently has 23 countries, has expanded, but also its theme: the conference has grown from a medical conference to a medical and pharmaceutical one. The event involves the work of 37 sections of theoretical and clinical areas, where the results of research by young scientists are heard, current and promising problems of modern medicine are considered. The results of the conference are summed up at the plenary session, which, traditionally, takes place in the elegant hall of the Academic Palace. The most active participants of the SSS and the Council of young scientists of BSMU are the organizers of the BIMCO Scientific Forum (Bukovinian international medical conference, since 2013 — Bukovinian international medical congress). In 2018, 1,556 participants from 75 educational institutions from 23 countries participated in BIMCO. 37 clinical masterclasses and workshops were held. The SSS of Bukovinian State Medical University looks to the future with confidence, we believe that what we have done will help students and young scientists realize their potential, help them achieve their goals, and lay a good foundation for future achievements.

== Sport, leisure, recreation ==
Physical education and the formation of a healthy lifestyle is carried out at the university in accordance with the target comprehensive program "Physical education — health of the nation". In order to form a healthy lifestyle in 2006, the measures of Bukovinian State Medical University for the Prevention of drug addiction and substance abuse were approved, which defined the terms of introduction into the educational process of the program for the promotion of a healthy lifestyle and the prevention of drug addiction and substance abuse; mentors of academic groups of the first year systematically highlight issues related to the prevention of drug use and their harmful impact on the mental and somatic state of a person.During the academic year, sports competitions in the main Sports dedicated to the day of the Physical Culture student of Ukraine, traditional sports contests of courses, inter-course competitions, championships among faculties and dormitories are held. The university's Sports Base hosts the city and regional competitions of various levels — the city and Regional volleyball and basketball championships. PE teachers conduct training work with the university's national teams in basketball, volleyball, table tennis, wrestling, and track and field events. The university has created conditions for recreation, rehabilitation and professional-applied classes during the working day, preventive Physical Culture and Sports classes, including the organization of sports and recreation tourism. On the basis of the Department of Disaster Medicine and Military Medicine, there are sports and recreation sections for students, teachers and staff in volleyball, basketball, table tennis, chess, tourism, athletics, athleticism, judo, wrestling, Sambo, calisthenics, aerobics. In summer, students have a rest in the summer sports and recreation camp of Repuzhintsy village, Zastavnivsky district, Chernivtsi region, where entertainment and sports competitions and themed holidays are held. Chernivtsi, Shiller STR., 11

== Palace of Culture and Recreation "Academichnyi" ==
The building, which was transferred by the local authorities for BSMU, houses the 700-seat Academic Palace, which provides excellent conditions for holding diverse student evenings, art events, creative meetings, and classes in amateur art circles. The university has a wonderful historical and medical museum, which is located in the building of the Academic Palace.

== Historical and medical museum ==
The museum was founded in 1968. He started its work with a small exhibition dedicated to the 25th anniversary of the Chernivtsi State Medical Institute in Bukovina. The exhibition was located in the small conference hall of the administrative and educational building (Teatralnaya Square, 2). The museum-room worked on a voluntary basis under the supervision of associate professor of the Department of Health Organization Boris Yakovlevich Drobnis until 1982. In 1987, the museum resumed its work as a full-time division of the Medical Institute and worked under the supervision of associate professor of the Department of Anatomy Grigory Grigoryevich Fischer until 1992. To accommodate the museum, a special hall was allocated in the reconstructed building of the Department of Medical Biology and Genetics on Yu. Fedkovich Street. In 1992–1993, the duties of the head of the museum were performed concurrently by Senior Laboratory Assistant of this department Natalia Aleksandrovna Vysochina. In 1993, V. I. Belous, assistant of the Department of Social Medicine and Health Care, was appointed director of the museum. In connection with the preparations for the 50th anniversary of Chernivtsi Medical Institute in Bukovina, a new permanent exhibition of the museum was created, which reflected only the beginning of the formation and activity of the second Kiev State Medical Institute (2nd KSMI) after its relocation in October 1944 to Chernivtsi. Part of the exhibition was dedicated to outstanding scientists of the Institute and its glorious graduates. Since 1995, for the first time, a thorough study of the history of the foundation and activities of Chernivtsi Medical Institute and documents of the State Archive of Ukraine, the State Archive of Kiev, and the State Archive of the Chernivtsi region began. Collected during 1995–1998, numerous and interesting historical documents, objects, and photographs needed a larger area for their placement and display to visitors. Therefore, in 1998, three halls with a total area of more than 300 square meters were allocated to accommodate the museum in student dormitory No. 5. In 1999, the museum staff included a researcher (0.75 rates) and a laboratory assistant (0.25 rates), a cleaner. After the restoration and repair of Academic Palace it was transferred to the Bukovina State Medical Academy, and in 2004 the museum was transferred and placed in the basement of the palace building. Since 2004, the museum has 5 halls with a total area of 320 m2 and auxiliary rooms, a computer and audio and video equipment. Allocated premises and material and technical equipment allow you to create proper conditions for preserving, studying and exhibiting the museum collection. The museum receives scientific and methodological support from the Chernivtsi Museum of Local Lore. The museum is included and has been a member of the European Association of Museums of the history of Medicine and Pharmacy since 2002. Every year, the museum is visited by more than 5,000 people — students, schoolchildren, university guests, participants of scientific conferences, university graduates during their meetings, residents and guests of the city. The museum is open daily from 9.00 to 17.00. Days off: Saturday, Sunday. Guided tours are available on request on all days of the week.

== Studios and clubs ==
The areas of work with students in studios and clubs are diverse: lectures, seminars, lectures, round tables, debates, meetings with leading scientists of the university, etc. are held. With the opening of the Academic Palace, circle work with students with creative abilities and musical preferences has revived. In particular, a theater studio, a ССR team (The Club of the cheerful and resourceful), a vocal studio, and so on have been created. All public holidays at the university are celebrated according to the calendar, concerts, ceremonial holidays are organized, etc. Now the academic Palace is one of the best cultural and artistic centers in Chernivtsi, equipped with modern stage equipment-lighting and radio equipment. Its stage is equipped with everything necessary for showing performances, concerts, conferences, lectures and social events. At Academic Palace there is a Folk amateur song and dance ensemble "Trembita", which takes part in concerts, festivals of the university and the region; it takes part in concerts for participants of scientific and methodological conferences held on the basis of the university; organizes and conducts Christmas carols; the ensemble participated in the All-Ukrainian Festival-competition of folk choreography named after Pavel Virsky. At Academic Palace, an Annual Art Week is held — a report of the palace collectives, in particular, a concert of the Folk amateur song and dance ensemble "Trembita", an evening of poetry "Poetry, let me go to your temple", a concert of modern song and dance, a performance of "Funny Scenes From Our Life", an Evening of instrumental music, a concert of opera and classical music. Every year there are thematic cultural and artistic holidays: Pharmaceutical worker's day, Dating ball, Education Workers 'Day, Faculty days, Student's day, New Year's Eve (New Year's matinee for employees' children, student evening, evening for employees), Christmas carols, St. Valentine's Day, International Day of women's rights and peace, Sixth-year benefit, Medical worker's day. Vocal students and members of the CCR teams (the Club of cheerful and resourceful) take part in organizing meetings with graduates of different years, regional and city events.

== Student life ==
The University Students' Self-government is of a great significance as a means of realization of the rights, duties and initiatives by the student community. Appropriate conditions of lodging are created for students. The students' town consists of five dormitories with good conditions of life; there are reading halls, sports halls, and libraries; students' computers are connected to the Internet.

The Palace "Academichny" actively functions for improvement of leisure time and students' creative abilities. A great variety of clubs and societies are placed here. Among them there is the studio of art, art and crafts, artistic photo, ensemble of folk song and dance "Trembita", vocal-instrumental ensemble, students' theatre and choreographic studio, etc.

== Directions of training and specialty ==
=== Medicine ===
- General Medicine (specialist)
- Pediatrics (specialist)
- Dentistry (specialist)
- Medical Psychology (specialist)
- Nursing (magister)
- Laboratory Diagnostics (bachelor)
- Nursing (junior medical specialist)

=== Pharmacy ===
Pharmacy (specialist) Clinical Pharmacy (specialist) Pharmacy (bachelor), extramural studies pharmacy (junior medical specialist), full-time and distance learning

== Famous graduates and employees of the university ==
See also: Category: Alumni of Bukovinian State Medical University

The formation and development of BSMU is associated with the names of famous scientists and facilitators. The graduates of BSMU successfully fulfil themselves in medical, pharmaceutical, economic, educational, scientific, social and cultural spheres of activity. BSMU is proud of its graduates, many of whom have reached the pinnacle of academic achievements and have realized their potential in professional and public life. Among the graduates and those who worked in the educational institution in different periods there are many well-known state and public figures, artists:

Bratus Vasyl Dmytrovych

Volyansky Yuriy Leonidovych

Gayko Heorhiy Vasylovych - Academician of the National Academy of Medical Sciences of Ukraine (elected 23.05.2012)[3] [Archived 31 August 2014 at the Wayback Machine], Director of the Institute of Traumatology and Orthopedics.

Husak Volodymyr Korniyovych

Elgiser Joseph - pianist, composer, winner of the UNESCO Gold Medal and the title ‘Golden Name of World Culture’

Ivasyuk Volodymyr Mykhailovych

Katz Semen Abramovych

Klantsa Andriy Ivanovych

Kopytman Mark Ruvymovych

Pavlishen Yuriy Ivanovych

Panasyuk Oleksiy Varfolomiyovych

Sandulyak Leontiy Ivanovych

Spizhenko Yuriy Prokopovych

Tymchuk Ivan Dmytrovych

Tkach Mykhailo Mykolaiovych

Flaksemberg Arkadiy Semenovych

Khodorovsky Heorhiy Ivanovych

Zabolotnyi D.I. - Academician of NAMS of Ukraine, Director of the State Institution “Institute of Otolaryngology named after O.S. Kolomiychenko”.

Zerbino D.D. - Academician of NAMS of Ukraine and Corresponding Member of NAS of Ukraine, Director of the Institute of Clinical Pathology.

Mykola Prodanchuk - Corresponding Member of the National Academy of Medical Sciences of Ukraine, Director of the State Institution “L.I. Medved Institute of Ecohygiene and Toxicology”.

== Ranking ==
According to the results of the rating assessment (Webometric Ranking of World Universities) of all types of activities, the university constantly takes leading places among higher medical educational institutions of Ukraine. In 2018, in the national ranking of higher education institutions of Ukraine ‘TOP-200’ the university took 7th place among higher medical education institutions; in the international ranking “WEBOMETRICS” the university is the 2nd among medical higher education institutions of Ukraine; the university repository takes 744th place in the world ranking “Ranking Web of Repositories” and 1st place among higher medical education institutions of Ukraine; according to the scientometric database Scopus in 2018, the university took 38th place among all higher education institutions of Ukraine and 7th among medical ones.

== Electronic Grade Book of academic performance ==
On January 29, 2014, Bukovinian State Medical University introduced the Electronic Grade Book. The testing period was successful and since September 1, 2014 the data on academic performance is available to all students of the university at ez.bsmu.edu.ua [Archived March 26, 2020 at the Wayback Machine].

The software of the Electronic Grade Book includes a teacher module (entering current grades, entering the results of individual independent work, the results of module control, analytics by academic groups, automated monthly progress reports), a module for working off missed or unaccredited classes for the teacher, a dean's module (with a wide range of analytical tools), a rector's module, a student module (with the option to view the results of current progress, of module control, and more), a module for the student (with the option to view the results of module control, and more).

== See also ==
- List of universities in Ukraine
- List of medical universities in Ukraine
