= Tarasov, Volgograd Oblast =

Tarasov Тарасов
- Khutor
- Location within Volgograd Oblast Location within Russia
- Coordinates: 50°29′N 44°29′E
- Country: Russia
- Region: Volgograd Oblast
- District: Danilovsky District
- Time zone: UTC+4:00

Tarasov (Russian: Тарасов) is a rural locality (a khutor) in Ostrovskoye Rural Settlement, Danilovsky District, Volgograd Oblast, Russia. The population was 34 as of 2010. There are 3 streets.

== Geography ==
Tarasov is located 53 km northeast of Danilovka (the district's administrative centre) by road. Medvedevo is the nearest rural locality.
