= Taras Mychalewych =

American sculptor (born 1945)

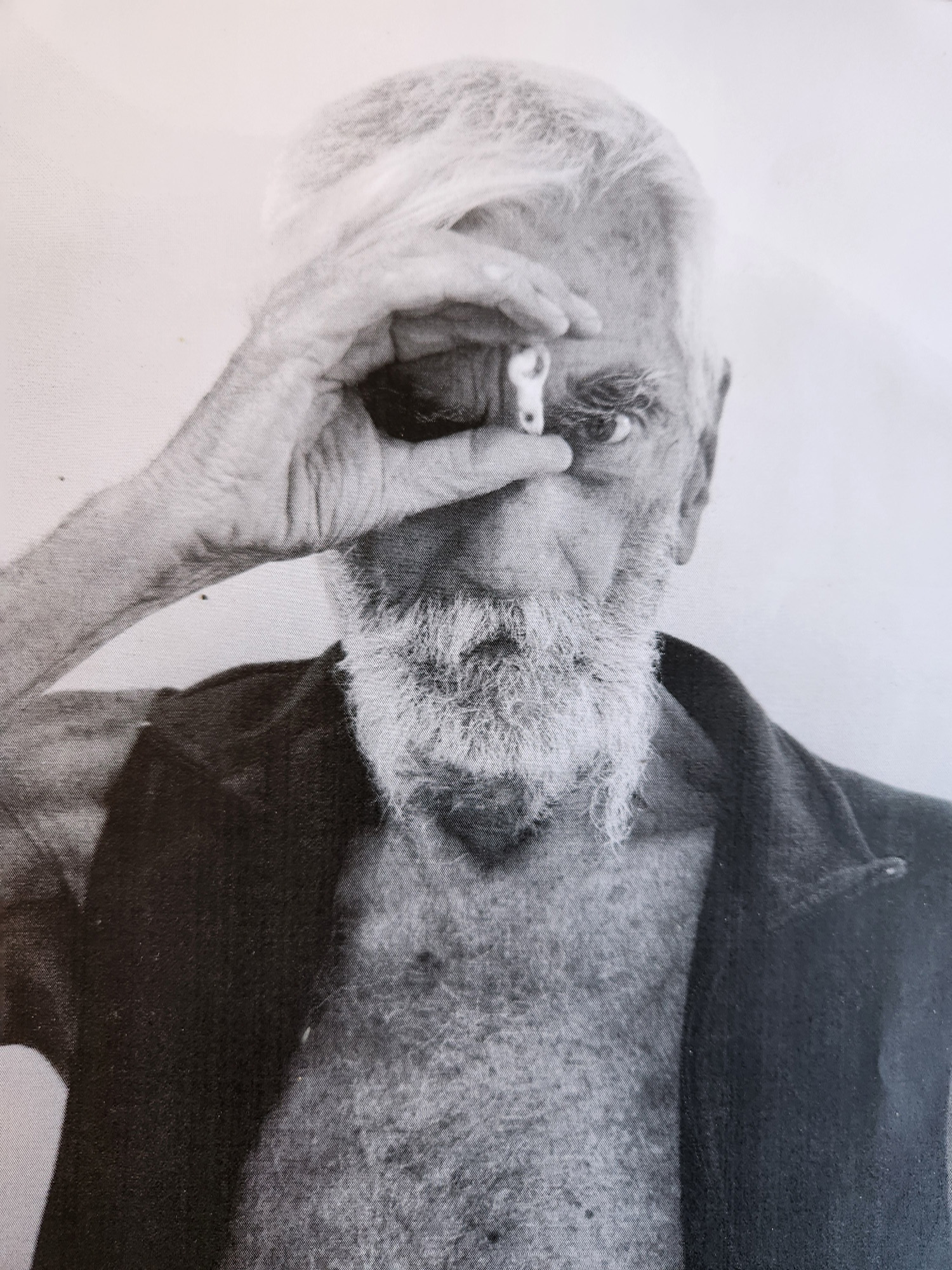
- Born: 12 December 1945; Munich, Germany
- Died: 9 February 2025 (aged 79); Columbus, New Mexico
- Education: Pennsylvania Academy of the Fine Arts
- Occupations: Sculptor mosaicist photographer writer
- Website: heartsoftheworldunited.org

Taras Mychalewych (12 December 1945 - 9 February 2025) was a Ukrainian-American sculptor, mosaicist, photographer, and writer. Most recently he lived in New Mexico, United States.

== Life and art ==
Taras Mychalewych was born in a DP camp in Munich, Germany, at the end of World War II. His family emigrated to the United States in 1949, and settled in St. Paul, Minnesota. Mychalewych attended the School of Applied Arts in St. Paul, and graduated from the Pennsylvania Academy of the Fine Arts in Philadelphia.

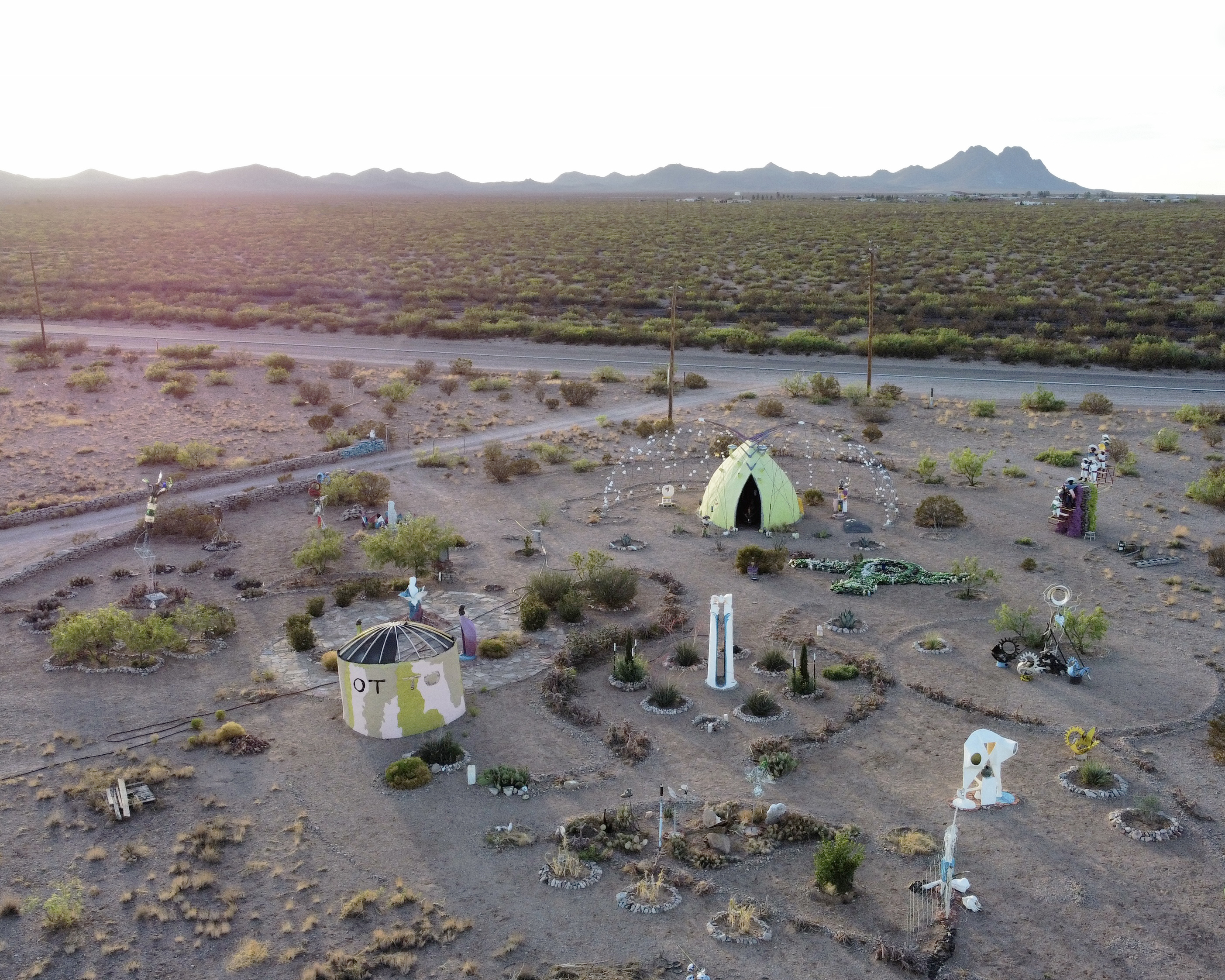
Frontera Sculpture Oasis, Columbus NM

A documentary of his stone carving sculptural work titled METAMORPHOSIS was produced by OKO FOTO in 1996.

He is known for his sculpture garden, Frontera Sculpture Oasis near Columbus, New Mexico.

== Exhibitions ==
Mychalewych had at least two known exhibitions:

- Group shows at the Pennsylvania Academy of the Fine Arts, Philadelphia
- Solo exhibit at the Ukrainian Educational and Cultural Center, Philadelphia 1994
