= Daniil Tarasov =

Daniil Tarasov may refer to:

- Daniil Tarasov (ice hockey, born 1991)
- Daniil Tarasov (ice hockey, born 1999)
