= Tarasova, Perm Krai =

Village in Perm Krai, Russia

Tarasova Тарасова
- Village
- Location within Perm Krai Location within Russia
- Coordinates: 59°13′N 54°56′E
- Country: Russia
- Region: Perm Krai
- District: Kudymkarsky District
- Time zone: UTC+5:00

Tarasova (Russian: Тарасова) is a rural locality (a village) in Oshibskoye Rural Settlement, Kudymkarsky District, Perm Krai, Russia. The population was 22 as of 2010.

== Geography ==
Tarasova is located 37 km northeast of Kudymkar (the district's administrative centre) by road. Petukhova is the nearest rural locality.
