= Khmelnytskyi Oblast Council =

Political division in Western Ukraine

Type
- Type: Unicameral
- Houses: 1

Leadership
- Speaker: Violeta Labaziuk

Structure
- Seats: 64
- Political groups: 13 Team Oleksandr Symshyshyn; 13 For the Future; 10 Servant of the People; 10 For specific cases; 7 European Solidarity; 7 Fatherland; 4 Radical Party

Elections
- Last election: 25 October 2020

Meeting place
- Khmelnytskyi, Khmelnytskyi Oblast

Website
- http://km-oblrada.gov.ua/

The Khmelnytskyi Oblast Council (Ukrainian: Хмельницька обласна рада) is the regional oblast council (parliament) of the Khmelnytskyi Oblast (province) located in Western Ukraine.

Council members are elected for five year terms. In order to gain representation in the council, a party must gain more than 5 percent of the total vote.

== Recent elections ==
=== 2020 ===
Distribution of seats after the 2020 Ukrainian local elections

- 13 Team Oleksandr Symshyshyn
- 13 For the Future
- 10 Servant of the People
- 10 For Concrete Deeds
- 7 European Solidarity
- 7 Fatherland
- 4 Radical Party

Election date was 25 October 2020

=== 2015 ===
Distribution of seats after the 2015 Ukrainian local elections

- 19 For Concrete Deeds
- 17 Solidarity
- 11 Agrarian Party
- 11 Fatherland
- 10 Svoboda
- 8 Radical Party
- 8 Self Reliance

Election date was 25 October 2015

== Chairmen ==
=== Regional executive committee ===
- Kalistrat Nezdymenko (1937–1938)
- Nikolai Kozyrev (1938–1939)
- Andrey Kovbasyuk (1939–1941, 1944–1948)
- Alexei Denisenko (1948–1949)
- Mikhail Kulbeikin (1949–1950)
- Nikolay Blagun (1950–1955)
- Ivan Levchenko (1955–1963)
- Andrey Shokhanov (industrial, 1963–1964)
- Ivan Levchenko (agrarian, 1963–1964)
- Ivan Levchenko (1964–1970)
- Timofey Lisovoy (1970–1972)
- Alexander Tovstanovsky (1972–1974)
- Makar Pochinok (1974–1982)
- Anatoly Popernyak (1982–1990)
- Yevhen Huselnykov (1990–1992)

=== Regional council ===
- Anatoly Popernyak (1990–1991)
- Yevhen Huselnykov (1991–1992)
- Petro Mazharov (1992–1994)
- Yevhen Huselnykov (1994–1998)
- Mykola Prystupa (1998–2002)
- Anatoliy Ovcharuk (2002–2006)
- Ivan Hladunyak (2006–2010)
- Mykola Derykot (2010–2014)
- Ivan Honchar (2014–2015)
- Mykhailo Zahorodnyi (2015–2020)
- Violeta Labaziuk (since 2020)
