= Tarasovka =

Tarasovka Тарасовка
- Village
- Location within Bashkortostan Location within Russia
- Coordinates: 55°37′N 54°52′E
- Country: Russia
- Region: Bashkortostan
- District: Dyurtyulinsky District
- Time zone: UTC+5:00

Tarasovka (Russian: Тарасовка) is a rural locality (a village) in Angasyakovsky Selsoviet, Dyurtyulinsky District, Bashkortostan, Russia. The population was 55 as of 2010. There are 4 streets.

== Geography ==
Tarasovka is located 29 km north of Dyurtyuli (the district's administrative centre) by road. Mayadyk is the nearest rural locality.
