= Tarasovo, Volgograd Oblast =

Tarasovo Тарасово
- Selo
- Location within Volgograd Oblast Location within Russia
- Coordinates: 50°33′N 44°46′E
- Country: Russia
- Region: Volgograd Oblast
- District: Kotovsky District
- Time zone: UTC+4:00

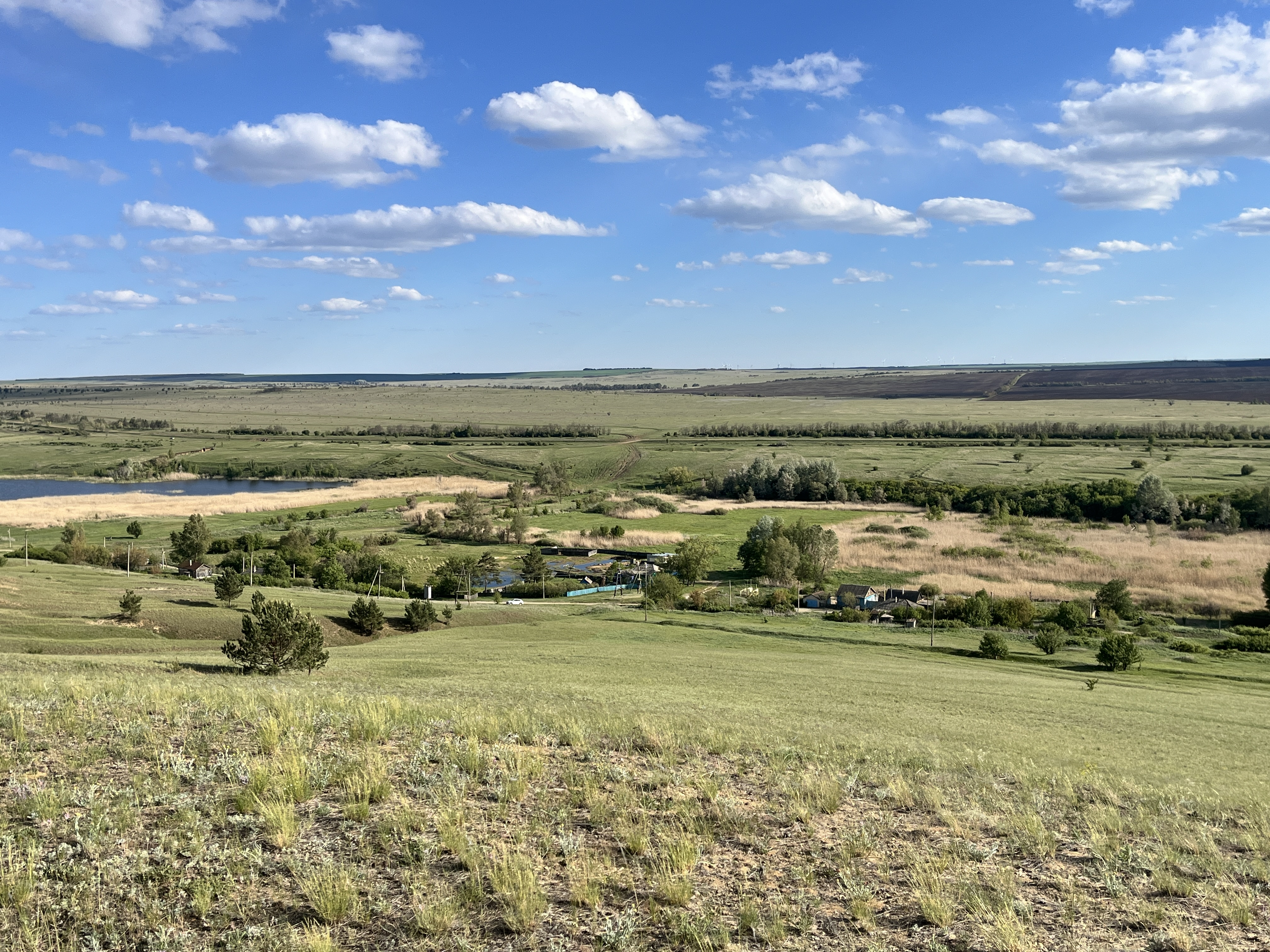

Tarasovo (Russian: Тара́сово) is a rural locality (a selo) in Miroshnikovskoye Rural Settlement, Kotovsky District, Volgograd Oblast, Russia. The population was 99 as of 2010. There are 3 streets.

== Geography ==
Tarasovo is located in steppe, on Volga Upland, on the right bank of the Tarasovka River, 30 km north of Kotovo (the district's administrative centre) by road. Doroshevo is the nearest rural locality.
