= Pereshchepnoye =

Pereshchepnoye Перещепное
- Selo
- Location within Volgograd Oblast Location within Russia
- Coordinates: 50°32′N 45°06′E
- Country: Russia
- Region: Volgograd Oblast
- District: Kotovsky District
- Time zone: UTC+4:00

Pereshchepnoye (Russian: Перещепное) is a rural locality (a selo) in Mokroolkhovskoye Rural Settlement, Kotovsky District, Volgograd Oblast, Russia. The population was 441 as of 2010. There are 11 streets.

== Geography ==
Pereshchepnoye is located on the Volga Upland, on the Mokraya Olkhovka River, 42 km northeast of Kotovo (the district's administrative centre) by road. Mokraya Olkhovka is the nearest rural locality.
