= Mokraya Olkhovka =

Mokraya Olkhovka Мокрая Ольховка
- Selo
- Location within Volgograd Oblast Location within Russia
- Coordinates: 50°28′N 44°59′E
- Country: Russia
- Region: Volgograd Oblast
- District: Kotovsky District
- Time zone: UTC+4:00

Mokraya Olkhovka (Russian: Мокрая Ольховка) is a rural locality (a selo) and the administrative center of Mokroolkhovskoye Rural Settlement, Kotovsky District, Volgograd Oblast, Russia. The population was 860 as of 2010. There are 18 streets.

== Geography ==
Mokraya Olkhovka is located in the steppe, on the Volga Upland, on the Mokraya Olkhovka River, 30 km northeast of Kotovo (the district's administrative centre) by road. Kryachki is the nearest rural locality.
