= Novoalexeyevka, Volgograd Oblast =

Novoalexeyevka Новоалексеевка
- Selo
- Location within Volgograd Oblast Location within Russia
- Coordinates: 50°22′N 44°59′E
- Country: Russia
- Region: Volgograd Oblast
- District: Kotovsky District
- Time zone: UTC+4:00

Novoalexeyevka (Russian: Новоалексеевка) is a rural locality (a selo) in Lapshinskoye Rural Settlement, Kotovsky District, Volgograd Oblast, Russia. The population was 113 as of 2010.

== Geography ==
Novoalexeyevka is located in steppe, on Volga Upland, on the right bank of the Malaya Olkhovka River, 18 km northeast of Kotovo (the district's administrative centre) by road. Lapshinskaya is the nearest rural locality.
