= Gordiyenki =

Gordiyenki Гордиенки
- Selo
- Location within Volgograd Oblast Location within Russia
- Coordinates: 50°34′N 44°39′E
- Country: Russia
- Region: Volgograd Oblast
- District: Kotovsky District
- Time zone: UTC+4:00

Gordiyenki (Russian: Гордиенки) is a rural locality (a selo) in Miroshnikovskoye Rural Settlement, Kotovsky District, Volgograd Oblast, Russia. The population was 227 as of 2010. There are 5 streets.

== Geography ==
Gordiyenki is located in steppe, on Volga Upland, on the Tarasovka River, 38 km north of Kotovo (the district's administrative centre) by road. Miroshniki is the nearest rural locality.
