= Lobynets =

Lobynets Лобынец
- Selo
- Location within Volgograd Oblast Location within Russia
- Coordinates: 50°21′N 44°56′E
- Country: Russia
- Region: Volgograd Oblast
- District: Kotovsky District
- Time zone: UTC+4:00

Lobynets (Russian: Лобынец) is a rural locality (a selo) in Lapshinskoye Rural Settlement, Kotovsky District, Volgograd Oblast, Russia. The population was 22 as of 2010.

== Geography ==
Lobynets is located in steppe, on Volga Upland, 15 km northeast of Kotovo (the district's administrative centre) by road. Lapshinskaya is the nearest rural locality.
