= Nizhniye Korobki =

Nizhniye Korobki Нижние Коробки
- Selo
- Location within Volgograd Oblast Location within Russia
- Coordinates: 50°19′N 44°29′E
- Country: Russia
- Region: Volgograd Oblast
- District: Kotovsky District
- Time zone: UTC+4:00

Nizhniye Korobki (Russian: Нижние Коробки) is a rural locality (a selo) in Popkovskoye Rural Settlement, Kotovsky District, Volgograd Oblast, Russia. The population was 252 as of 2010. There are 5 streets.

== Geography ==
Nizhniye Korobki is located in steppe, on Volga Upland, on the right bank of the Lomovka River, 27 km west of Kotovo (the district's administrative centre) by road. Popov is the nearest rural locality.
