= Smorodino, Volgograd Oblast =

Smorodino Смородино
- Selo
- Location within Volgograd Oblast Location within Russia
- Coordinates: 50°20′N 45°06′E
- Country: Russia
- Region: Volgograd Oblast
- District: Kotovsky District
- Time zone: UTC+4:00

Smorodino (Russian: Смородино) is a rural locality (a selo) in Lapshinskoye Rural Settlement, Kotovsky District, Volgograd Oblast, Russia. The population was 216 as of 2010. There are 4 streets.

== Geography ==
Smorodino is located in steppe, on Volga Upland, on the right bank of the Sukhaya Olkhovka River, 28 km east of Kotovo (the district's administrative centre) by road. Lapshinskaya is the nearest rural locality.
