= Burluk =

Burluk Бурлук
- Selo
- Location within Volgograd Oblast Location within Russia
- Coordinates: 50°33′N 44°31′E
- Country: Russia
- Region: Volgograd Oblast
- District: Kotovsky District
- Time zone: UTC+4:00

Burluk (Russian: Бурлу́к) is a rural locality (a selo) and the administrative center of Burlukskoye Rural Settlement, Kotovsky District, Volgograd Oblast, Russia. The population was 711 as of 2010. There are 12 streets.

== Geography ==
Burluk is located in steppe, on Volga Upland, on the right bank of the Burluk River, 52 km northwest of Kotovo (the district's administrative centre) by road. Gromki is the nearest rural locality.
