= Popki, Volgograd Oblast =

Popki Попки
- Khutor
- Location within Volgograd Oblast Location within Russia
- Coordinates: 50°11′N 44°30′E
- Country: Russia
- Region: Volgograd Oblast
- District: Kotovsky District
- Time zone: UTC+4:00

Popki (Russian: Попки) is a rural locality (a khutor) and the administrative center of Popkovskoye Rural Settlement, Kotovsky District, Volgograd Oblast, Russia. The population was 971 as of 2010. There are 16 streets.

== Geography ==
Popki is located in steppe, on Volga Upland, on the bank of the Olkhovka River, 34 km southwest of Kotovo (the district's administrative centre) by road. Romanov is the nearest rural locality.
