= Avilov =

Avilov (masculine) or Avilova (feminine) may refer to:

- Avilov (surname) (fem. Avilova), Russian last name
- Avilov (rural locality), several rural localities in Russia
- Avilov Formation, a fossiliferous stratigraphic unit in Ukraine
