= Kryachki =

Kryachki Крячки
- Selo
- Location within Volgograd Oblast Location within Russia
- Coordinates: 50°31′N 44°52′E
- Country: Russia
- Region: Volgograd Oblast
- District: Kotovsky District
- Time zone: UTC+4:00

Kryachki (Russian: Крячки) is a rural locality (a selo) in Mokroolkhovskoye Rural Settlement, Kotovsky District, Volgograd Oblast, Russia. The population was 343 as of 2010. There are 8 streets.

== Geography ==
Kryachki is located in the steppe, on the Volga Upland, 37 km northeast of Kotovo (the district's administrative centre) by road. Netkachevo is the nearest rural locality.
