= Moiseyevo, Volgograd Oblast =

Moiseyevo Моисеево
- Selo
- Location within Volgograd Oblast Location within Russia
- Coordinates: 50°12′N 44°44′E
- Country: Russia
- Region: Volgograd Oblast
- District: Kotovsky District
- Time zone: UTC+4:00

Moiseyevo (Russian: Моисеево) is a rural locality (a selo) and the administrative center of Moiseyevskoye Rural Settlement, Kotovsky District, Volgograd Oblast, Russia. The population was 939 as of 2010. There are 14 streets.

== Geography ==
Moiseyevo is located in steppe, on Volga Upland, on the bank of the Bolshaya Kazanka River, 16 km southwest of Kotovo (the district's administrative centre) by road. Yefimovka is the nearest rural locality.
