= Miroshniki =

Miroshniki Мирошники
- Selo
- Location within Volgograd Oblast Location within Russia
- Coordinates: 50°35′N 44°39′E
- Country: Russia
- Region: Volgograd Oblast
- District: Kotovsky District
- Time zone: UTC+4:00

Miroshniki (Russian: Мирошники) is a rural locality (a selo) and the administrative center of Miroshnikovskoye Rural Settlement, Kotovsky District, Volgograd Oblast, Russia. The population was 402 as of 2010. There are 8 streets.

== Geography ==
Miroshniki is located 40 km northwest of Kotovo (the district's administrative centre) by road. Burluk is the nearest rural locality.
