= Plemkhoz =

Plemkhoz Племхоз
- Selo
- Location within Volgograd Oblast Location within Russia
- Coordinates: 50°13′N 44°50′E
- Country: Russia
- Region: Volgograd Oblast
- District: Kotovsky District
- Time zone: UTC+4:00

Plemkhoz (Russian: Племхоз) is a rural locality (a selo) in Korostinskoye Rural Settlement, Kotovsky District, Volgograd Oblast, Russia. The population was 229 as of 2010. There are 3 streets.

== Geography ==
Plemkhoz is located on Volga Upland, on the right bank of the Burluk River, 15 km southeast of Kotovo (the district's administrative centre) by road. Kotovo is the nearest rural locality.
