= Doroshevo =

Doroshevo Дорошево
- Selo
- Location within Volgograd Oblast Location within Russia
- Coordinates: 50°33′N 44°43′E
- Country: Russia
- Region: Volgograd Oblast
- District: Kotovsky District
- Time zone: UTC+4:00

Doroshevo (Russian: Дорошево) is a rural locality (a selo) in Miroshnikovskoye Rural Settlement, Kotovsky District, Volgograd Oblast, Russia. The population was 68 as of 2010. There are 2 streets.

== Geography ==
Doroshevo is located in steppe, on Volga Upland, on the Tarasovka River, 34 km north of Kotovo (the district's administrative centre) by road. Tarasovo is the nearest rural locality.
