= Slyusarevo =

Slyusarevo Слюсарево
- Selo
- Location within Volgograd Oblast Location within Russia
- Coordinates: 50°28′N 44°47′E
- Country: Russia
- Region: Volgograd Oblast
- District: Kotovsky District
- Time zone: UTC+4:00

Slyusarevo (Russian: Слюсарево) is a rural locality (a selo) in Miroshnikovskoye Rural Settlement, Kotovsky District, Volgograd Oblast, Russia. The population was 461 as of 2010. There are 5 streets.

== Geography ==
Slyusarevo is located in steppe, on Volga Upland, on the right bank of the Solodovka River, 21 km north of Kotovo (the district's administrative centre) by road. Doroshevo is the nearest rural locality.
