= Avilovo, Volgograd Oblast =

Avilovo Авилово
- Selo
- Location within Volgograd Oblast Location within Russia
- Coordinates: 50°13′N 45°04′E
- Country: Russia
- Region: Volgograd Oblast
- District: Kotovsky District
- Time zone: UTC+4:00

Avilovo (Russian: Авилово) is a rural locality (a selo) in Kuptsovskoye Rural Settlement, Kotovsky District, Volgograd Oblast, Russia. The population was 131 as of 2010. There are 3 streets.

== Geography ==
Avilovo is located in forest steppe, on Volga Upland, on the right bank of the Mokraya Olkhovka River, 32 km southeast of Kotovo (the district's administrative centre) by road. Novonikolayevka is the nearest rural locality.
