= Avilovo =

Avilovo (Russian: Авилово) is the name of several rural localities in Russia:

- Avilovo, Oryol Oblast, a village in Ploskovsky Selsoviet of Dmitrovsky District in Oryol Oblast
- Avilovo, Volgograd Oblast, a selo in Kuptsovsky Selsoviet of Kotovsky District in Volgograd Oblast
