= Netkachevo =

Netkachevo Неткачево
- Selo
- Location within Volgograd Oblast Location within Russia
- Coordinates: 50°32′N 44°55′E
- Country: Russia
- Region: Volgograd Oblast
- District: Kotovsky District
- Time zone: UTC+4:00

Netkachevo (Russian: Неткачево) is a rural locality (a selo) in Mokroolkhovskoye Rural Settlement, Kotovsky District, Volgograd Oblast, Russia. The population was 83 as of 2010. There are 2 streets.

== Geography ==
Netkachevo is located in steppe, on Volga Upland, 41 km northeast of Kotovo (the district's administrative centre) by road. Kryachki is the nearest rural locality.
