= Avilov (surname) =

Avilov (Russian: Авилов; masculine) or Avilova (Авилова; feminine) is a Russian surname. It derives from the old Russian male first name Vavila (Vavilo).

The following people share this surname:

- Lydia Avilova (1864–1943), Russian Soviet writer and memoirist
- Mikhail Avilov (1882–1954), Russian Soviet painter and art educator
- Mykola Avilov (born 1948), Ukrainian Soviet decathlete
- Pyotr Avilov (1910–2004), Soviet sports shooter
- Valentin Avilov, recipient of the Order of Naval Merit, a state decoration of Russia
- Viktor Avilov (diplomat) (1900–?), Russian Soviet diplomat
- Viktor Avilov (actor)
- Vladimir Avilov, Estonian association football player; captain of FC Infonet
- Yevgeny Avilov, mayor of the city of Tula, Russia

== See also ==
- Nikolai Glebov-Avilov (1887–1937), Russian Bolshevik and Soviet politician
- Avilovo, several rural localities in Russia
