= Avilov (rural locality) =

Avilov (Russian: Авилов) is the name of several rural localities in Russia:

- Avilov, Konstantinovsky District, Rostov Oblast, a khutor in Avilovskoye Rural Settlement of Konstantinovsky District in Rostov Oblast
- Avilov, Rodionovo-Nesvetaysky District, Rostov Oblast, a khutor in Rodionovo-Nesvetayskoye Rural Settlement of Rodionovo-Nesvetaysky District in Rostov Oblast
- Avilov, Volgograd Oblast, a khutor in Avilovsky Selsoviet of Ilovlinsky District in Volgograd Oblast
