= Avilov, Volgograd Oblast =

Avilov Авилов
- Khutor
- Location within Volgograd Oblast Location within Russia
- Coordinates: 49°22′N 44°00′E
- Country: Russia
- Region: Volgograd Oblast
- District: Ilovlinsky District
- Time zone: UTC+4:00

Avilov (Russian: Авилов) is a rural locality (a khutor) and the administrative center of Avilovskoye Rural Settlement, Ilovlinsky District, Volgograd Oblast, Russia. The population was 724 as of 2010. There are 15 streets.

== Geography ==
Avilov is located in steppe, on the Volga Upland, 12 km northeast of Ilovlya (the district's administrative centre) by road. Borovki is the nearest rural locality.
