= Kotovo, Volgograd Oblast =

Town in Volgograd Oblast, Russia

Kotovo, Volgograd Oblast Ко́тово
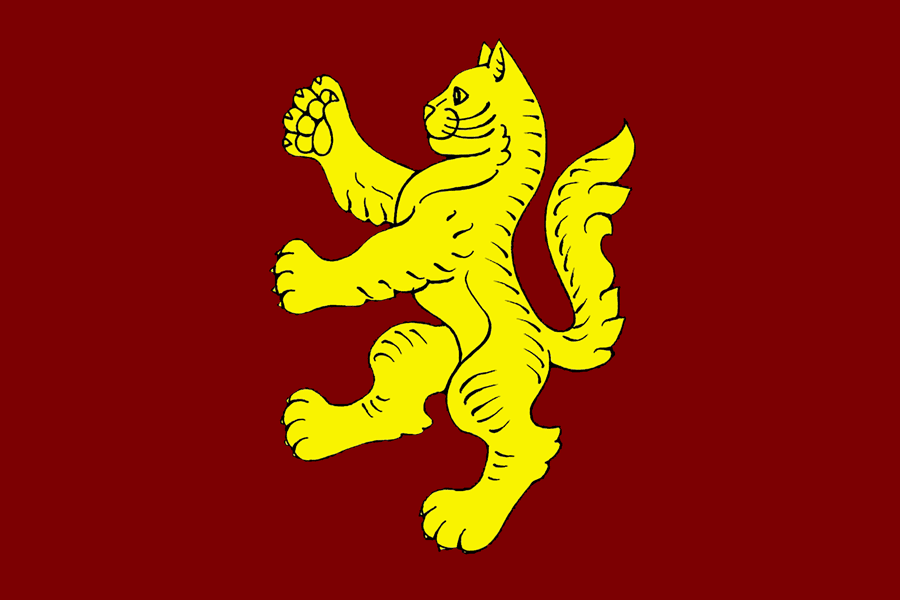
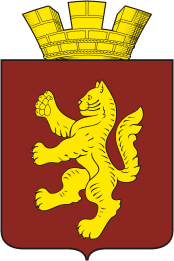
- Flag Coat of arms
- Interactive map of Kotovo, Volgograd Oblast
- Location of Kotovo, Volgograd Oblast Kotovo, Volgograd Oblast (Volgograd Oblast)
- Coordinates: 50°19′N 44°48′E
- Country: Russia
- Federal subject: Volgograd Oblast
- Administrative district: Kotovsky District
- Founded: 1710

Government
  - Head of Urban Settlement: Natalia Efimchenko
- Elevation: 150 m (490 ft)

Population (2010 Census)
  - Total: 24,115
  - Estimate (2025): 19,955 (−17.3%)

Administrative status
  - Capital of: Kotovsky District
- Time zone: UTC+3 (MSK)
- Postal code: 143521
- OKTMO ID: 18626101001

Kotovo (Russian: Ко́тово) is a town and the administrative center of Kotovsky District in Volgograd Oblast, Russia, located on the Malaya Kazanka River (a tributary of the Don), 229 kilometers (142 mi) north of Volgograd, the administrative center of the oblast. Population: 24,115 (2010 census); 26,763 (2002 census); 25,360 (1989 Soviet census).

== History ==
It was founded in the 1710s and granted town status in 1966.

== Administrative and municipal status ==
Within the framework of administrative divisions of Russia, Kotovo serves as the administrative center of Kotovsky District. As an administrative division, it is incorporated within Kotovsky District as the town of district significance of Kotovo. As a municipal division, the town of district significance of Kotovo is incorporated within Kotovsky Municipal District as Kotovo Urban Settlement.
