= Kotovsky District =

Kotovsky District Котовский район (Russian)
- District
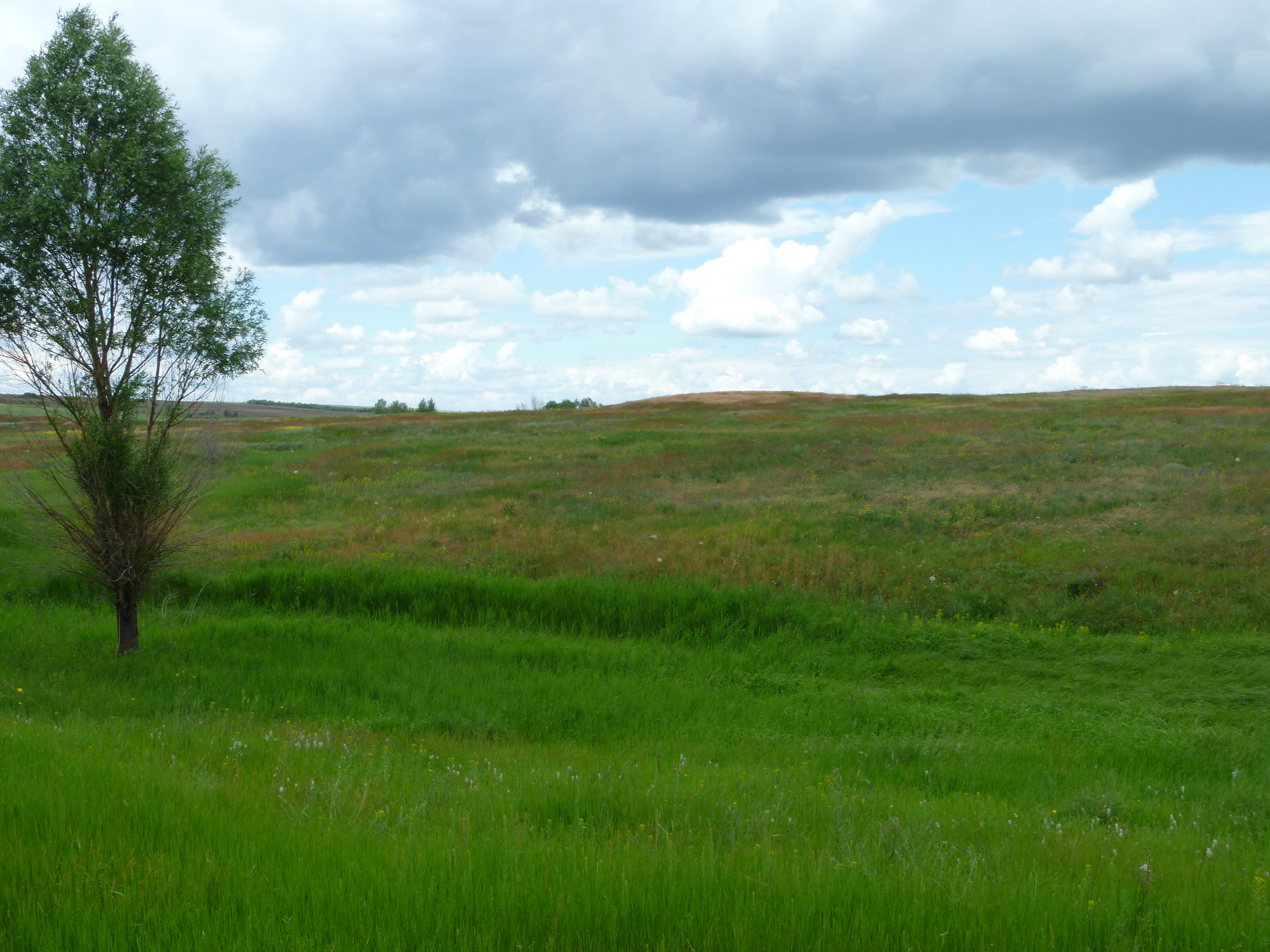
- Landscape in Kotovsky District

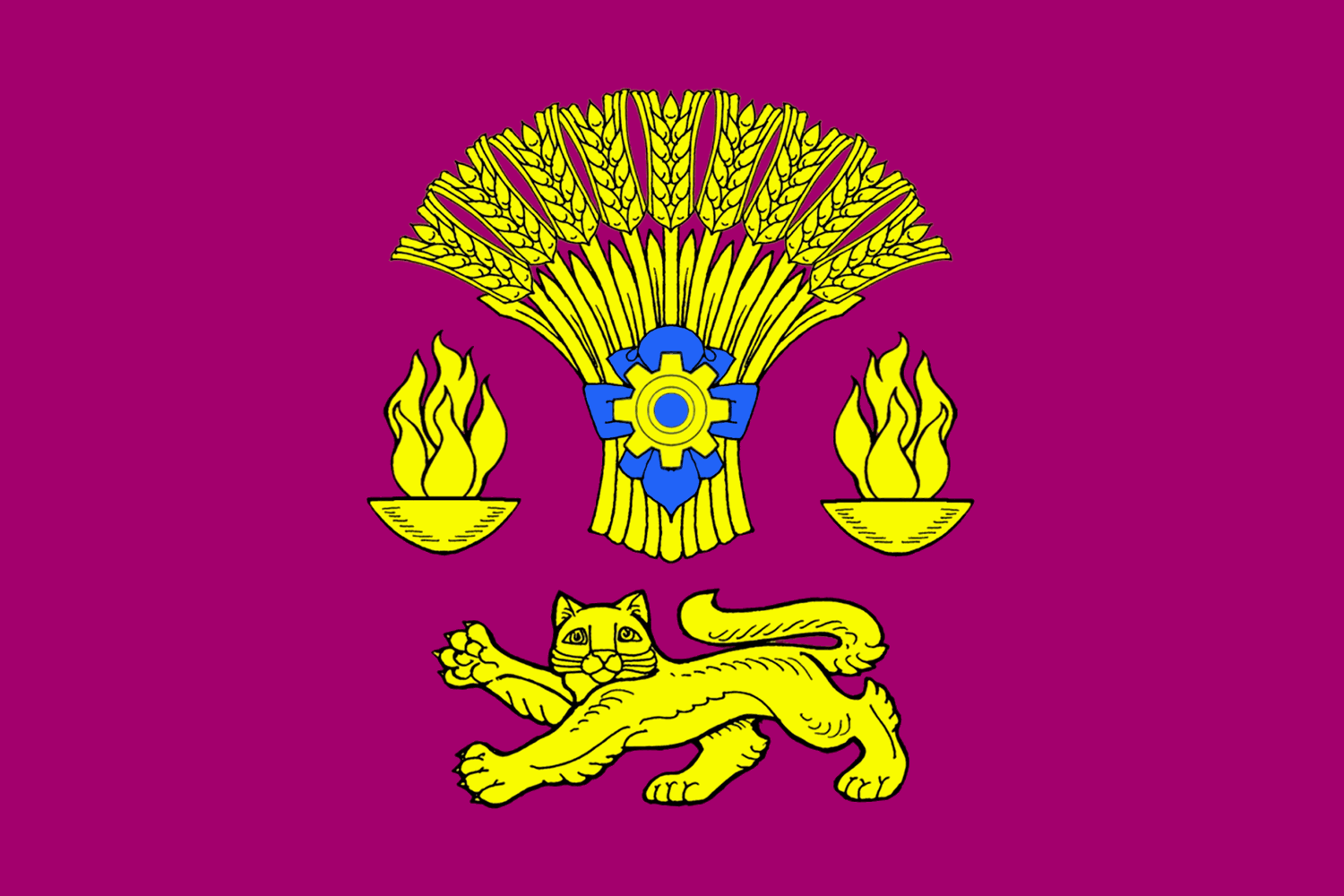
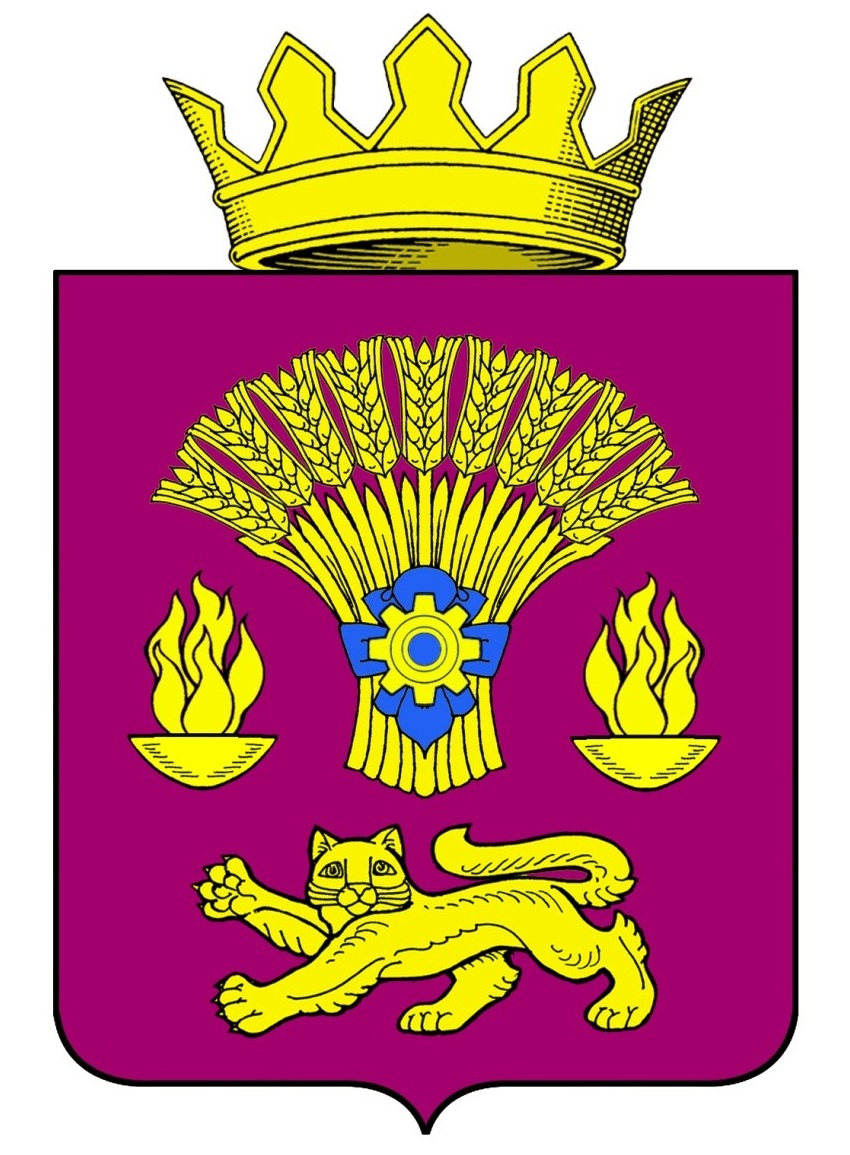
- Flag Coat of arms
- Location of Kotovsky District in Volgograd Oblast
- Coordinates: 50°19′N 44°48′E
- Country: Russia
- Federal subject: Volgograd Oblast
- Established: 1963
- Administrative center: Kotovo

Area
  - Total: 2,450 km^{2} (950 sq mi)

Population (2010 Census)
  - Total: 34,477
  - Density: 14.1/km^{2} (36.4/sq mi)
  - Urban: 69.9%
  - Rural: 30.1%

Administrative structure
  - Administrative divisions: 1 Towns of district significance, 11 Selsoviets
  - Inhabited localities: 1 cities/towns, 25 rural localities

Municipal structure
  - Municipally incorporated as: Kotovsky Municipal District
  - Municipal divisions: 1 urban settlements, 8 rural settlements
- Time zone: UTC+3 (MSK)
- OKTMO ID: 18626000
- Website: http://www.admkotovo.ru/

Kotovsky District (Russian: Ко́товский райо́н) is an administrative district (raion), one of the thirty-three in Volgograd Oblast, Russia. As a municipal division, it is incorporated as Kotovsky Municipal District. It is located in the north of the oblast. The area of the district is 2,450 square kilometers (950 sq mi). Its administrative center is the town of Kotovo. Population: 34,477 (2010 census); 38,700 (2002 Census); 38,081 (1989 Soviet census). The population of Kotovo accounts for 69.9% of the district's total population.
