= Administrative divisions of Volgograd Oblast =

Volgograd Oblast Russia
- Administrative center: Volgograd

Administrative structure (as of 2012)
- Districts: 33
- Cities/towns: 19
- Urban-type settlements: 17
- Selsovets: 448

Municipal structure (as of 2002)
- Rural settlements: 1,509 (inhabited); 56 (uninhabited)

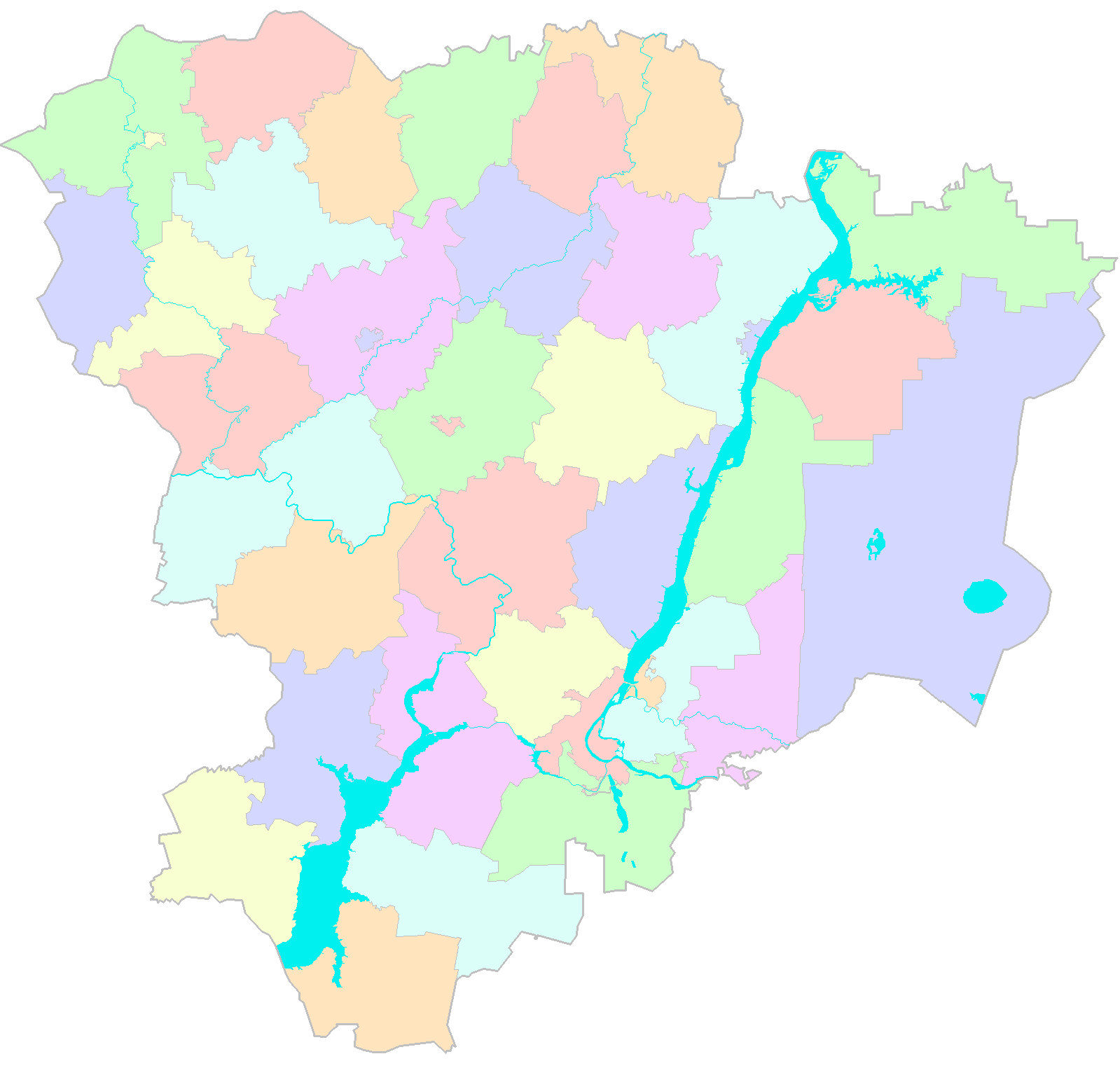
Map of Volgograd Oblast (full colour)

Volgograd Oblast is a federal subject of Russia.

== Administrative and municipal divisions ==
- Cities and towns under the oblast's jurisdiction:
  - Volgograd (Волгоград) (administrative center)
    - city districts:
      - Dzerzhinsky (Дзержинский)
      - Kirovsky (Кировский)
      - Krasnoarmeysky (Красноармейский)
      - Krasnooktyabrsky (Краснооктябрьский)
      - Sovetsky (Советский)
      - Traktorozavodsky (Тракторозаводский)
      - Tsentralny (Центральный)
      - Voroshilovsky (Ворошиловский)
  - Frolovo (Фролово)
  - Kamyshin (Камышин)
  - Mikhaylovka (Михайловка)
    - Urban-type settlements under the town's jurisdiction:
      - Sebrovo (Себрово)
  - Uryupinsk (Урюпинск)
  - Volzhsky (Волжский)
- Districts:
  - Alexeyevsky (Алексеевский)
    - with 16 selsovets under the district's jurisdiction.
  - Bykovsky (Быковский)
    - Urban-type settlements under the district's jurisdiction:
      - Bykovo (Быково)
    - with 13 selsovets under the district's jurisdiction.
  - Chernyshkovsky (Чернышковский)
    - Urban-type settlements under the district's jurisdiction:
      - Chernyshkovsky (Чернышковский)
    - with 11 selsovets under the district's jurisdiction.
  - Danilovsky (Даниловский)
    - Urban-type settlements under the district's jurisdiction:
      - Danilovka (Даниловка)
    - with 11 selsovets under the district's jurisdiction.
  - Dubovsky (Дубовский)
    - Towns under the district's jurisdiction:
      - Dubovka (Дубовка)
    - with 14 selsovets under the district's jurisdiction.
  - Frolovsky (Фроловский)
    - with 13 selsovets under the district's jurisdiction.
  - Gorodishchensky (Городищенский)
    - Urban-type settlements under the district's jurisdiction:
      - Gorodishche (Городище)
      - Novy Rogachik (Новый Рогачик)
      - Yerzovka (Ерзовка)
    - with 15 selsovets under the district's jurisdiction.
  - Ilovlinsky (Иловлинский)
    - Urban-type settlements under the district's jurisdiction:
      - Ilovlya (Иловля)
    - with 14 selsovets under the district's jurisdiction.
  - Kalachyovsky (Калачёвский)
    - Towns under the district's jurisdiction:
      - Kalach-na-Donu (Калач-на-Дону)
    - with 12 selsovets under the district's jurisdiction.
  - Kamyshinsky (Камышинский)
    - Towns under the district's jurisdiction:
      - Petrov Val (Петров Вал)
    - with 20 selsovets under the district's jurisdiction.
  - Kikvidzensky (Киквидзенский)
    - with 12 selsovets under the district's jurisdiction.
  - Kletsky (Клетский)
    - with 10 selsovets under the district's jurisdiction.
  - Kotelnikovsky (Котельниковский)
    - Towns under the district's jurisdiction:
      - Kotelnikovo (Котельниково)
    - with 15 selsovets under the district's jurisdiction.
  - Kotovsky (Котовский)
    - Towns under the district's jurisdiction:
      - Kotovo (Котово)
    - with 11 selsovets under the district's jurisdiction.
  - Kumylzhensky (Кумылженский)
    - with 17 selsovets under the district's jurisdiction.
  - Leninsky (Ленинский)
    - Towns under the district's jurisdiction:
      - Leninsk (Ленинск)
    - with 12 selsovets under the district's jurisdiction.
  - Mikhaylovsky (Михайловский)
    - with 15 selsovets under the district's jurisdiction.
  - Nekhayevsky (Нехаевский)
    - with 14 selsovets under the district's jurisdiction.
  - Nikolayevsky (Николаевский)
    - Towns under the district's jurisdiction:
      - Nikolayevsk (Николаевск)
    - with 12 selsovets under the district's jurisdiction.
  - Novoanninsky (Новоаннинский)
    - Towns under the district's jurisdiction:
      - Novoanninsky (Новоаннинский)
    - with 13 selsovets under the district's jurisdiction.
  - Novonikolayevsky (Новониколаевский)
    - Urban-type settlements under the district's jurisdiction:
      - Novonikolayevsky (Новониколаевский)
    - with 10 selsovets under the district's jurisdiction.
  - Oktyabrsky (Октябрьский)
    - Urban-type settlements under the district's jurisdiction:
      - Oktyabrsky (Октябрьский)
    - with 15 selsovets under the district's jurisdiction.
  - Olkhovsky (Ольховский)
    - with 14 selsovets under the district's jurisdiction.
  - Pallasovsky (Палласовский)
    - Towns under the district's jurisdiction:
      - Pallasovka (Палласовка)
    - with 12 selsovets under the district's jurisdiction.
  - Rudnyansky (Руднянский)
    - Urban-type settlements under the district's jurisdiction:
      - Rudnya (Рудня)
    - with 9 selsovets under the district's jurisdiction.
  - Serafimovichsky (Серафимовичский)
    - Towns under the district's jurisdiction:
      - Serafimovich (Серафимович)
    - with 15 selsovets under the district's jurisdiction.
  - Sredneakhtubinsky (Среднеахтубинский)
    - Towns under the district's jurisdiction:
      - Krasnoslobodsk (Краснослободск)
    - Urban-type settlements under the district's jurisdiction:
      - Srednyaya Akhtuba (Средняя Ахтуба)
    - with 9 selsovets under the district's jurisdiction.
  - Staropoltavsky (Старополтавский)
    - with 18 selsovets under the district's jurisdiction.
  - Surovikinsky (Суровикинский)
    - Towns under the district's jurisdiction:
      - Surovikino (Суровикино)
    - with 13 selsovets under the district's jurisdiction.
  - Svetloyarsky (Светлоярский)
    - Urban-type settlements under the district's jurisdiction:
      - Svetly Yar (Светлый Яр)
    - with 9 selsovets under the district's jurisdiction.
  - Uryupinsky (Урюпинский)
    - with 23 selsovets under the district's jurisdiction.
  - Yelansky (Еланский)
    - Urban-type settlements under the district's jurisdiction:
      - Yelan (Елань)
    - with 20 selsovets under the district's jurisdiction.
  - Zhirnovsky (Жирновский)
    - Towns under the district's jurisdiction:
      - Zhirnovsk (Жирновск)
    - Urban-type settlements under the district's jurisdiction:
      - Krasny Yar (Красный Яр)
      - Linyovo (Линёво)
      - Medveditsky (Медведицкий)
    - with 11 selsovets under the district's jurisdiction.
