= Linyovo =

Linyovo (Russian: Линёво) is the name of several localities in Russia:

- Linyovo, Novosibirsk Oblast, an urban-type settlement in Iskitimsky District in Novosibirsk Oblast;
- Linyovo, Volgograd Oblast, an work settlement in Zhirnovsky District in Volgograd Oblast.
- Linyovo Ozero, a village (selo) in Khiloksky District of Zabaykalsky Krai.
