= Klyonovka =

Klyonovka Клёновка
- Selo
- Location within Volgograd Oblast Location within Russia
- Coordinates: 51°08′N 44°29′E
- Country: Russia
- Region: Volgograd Oblast
- District: Zhirnovsky District
- Time zone: UTC+4:00

Klyonovka (Russian: Клёновка) is a rural locality (a selo) and the administrative center of Klenovskoye Rural Settlement, Zhirnovsky District, Volgograd Oblast, Russia. The population was 928 as of 2010. There are 16 streets.

== Geography ==
Klyonovka is located in steppe of Khopyorsko-Buzulukskaya Plain, on the right bank of the Shchelkan River, 36 km northwest of Zhirnovsk (the district's administrative centre) by road. Fyodorovka is the nearest rural locality.
