= Serpokrylovo =

Serpokrylovo Серпокрылово
- Selo
- Location within Volgograd Oblast Location within Russia
- Coordinates: 50°35′N 45°03′E
- Country: Russia
- Region: Volgograd Oblast
- District: Zhirnovsky District
- Time zone: UTC+4:00

Serpokrylovo (Russian: Серпокрылово) is a rural locality (a selo) in Borodachyovskoye Rural Settlement, Zhirnovsky District, Volgograd Oblast, Russia. The population was 54 as of 2010. There are 2 streets.

== Geography ==
Serpokrylovo is located in forest steppe of Volga Upland, 67 km southeast of Zhirnovsk (the district's administrative centre) by road. Chizhi is the nearest rural locality.
