= Podchinny =

Podchinny Подчинный
- Settlement
- Location within Volgograd Oblast Location within Russia
- Coordinates: 50°52′N 45°13′E
- Country: Russia
- Region: Volgograd Oblast
- District: Zhirnovsky District
- Time zone: UTC+4:00

Podchinny (Russian: Подчинный) is a rural locality (a settlement) in Alyoshnikovskoye Rural Settlement, Zhirnovsky District, Volgograd Oblast, Russia. The population was 145 as of 2010. There are 4 streets.

== Geography ==
Podchinny is located in forest steppe of Volga Upland, 43 km southeast of Zhirnovsk (the district's administrative centre) by road. Aleshniki is the nearest rural locality.
