= Zhirnovskoye Urban Settlement =

Zhirnovskoye Urban Settlement is the name of several municipal formations in Russia.

- Zhirnovskoye Urban Settlement, an administrative division and a municipal formation which the work settlement of Zhirnov and four rural localities in Tatsinsky District of Rostov Oblast are incorporated as
- Zhirnovskoye Urban Settlement, a municipal formation which the town of district significance of Zhirnovsk in Zhirnovsky District of Volgograd Oblast is incorporated as

== See also ==
- Zhirnovsky
