= Melzavod =

Melzavod Мельзавод
- Settlement
- Location within Volgograd Oblast Location within Russia
- Coordinates: 50°49′N 44°41′E
- Country: Russia
- Region: Volgograd Oblast
- District: Zhirnovsky District
- Time zone: UTC+4:00

Melzavod (Russian: Мельзавод) is a rural locality (a settlement) in Medveditskoye Urban Settlement, Zhirnovsky District, Volgograd Oblast, Russia. The population was 172 as of 2010. There are 3 streets.

== Geography ==
Melzavod is located in steppe of Volga Upland, on the left bank of the Dobrinka River, 27 km southwest of Zhirnovsk (the district's administrative centre) by road. Nizhnyaya Dobrinka is the nearest rural locality.
