= Morozovo, Volgograd Oblast =

Morozovo Морозово
- Selo
- Location within Volgograd Oblast Location within Russia
- Coordinates: 50°45′N 44°53′E
- Country: Russia
- Region: Volgograd Oblast
- District: Zhirnovsky District
- Time zone: UTC+4:00

Morozovo (Russian: Морозово) is a rural locality (a selo) in Krasnoyarskoye Rural Settlement, Zhirnovsky District, Volgograd Oblast, Russia. The population was 45 as of 2010. There are 10 streets.

== Geography ==
Morozovo is located in steppe of Khopyorsko-Buzulukskaya Plain, on the left bank of the Dobrinka River, 49 km southeast of Zhirnovsk (the district's administrative centre) by road. Krasny Yar is the nearest rural locality.
