= Nedostupov =

Nedostupov Недоступов
- Khutor
- Location within Volgograd Oblast Location within Russia
- Coordinates: 50°39′N 44°53′E
- Country: Russia
- Region: Volgograd Oblast
- District: Zhirnovsky District
- Time zone: UTC+4:00

Nedostupov (Russian: Недоступов) is a rural locality (a khutor) in Krasnoyarskoye Rural Settlement, Zhirnovsky District, Volgograd Oblast, Russia. The population was 263 as of 2010. There are 8 streets.

== Geography ==
Nedostupov is situated in steppe of Khopyorsko-Buzulukskaya Plain, on the right bank of the Burluk River, 52 km south of Zhirnovsk (the district's administrative centre) by road. The closest rural locality to Nedostupov is Borodachi.
