= Zhuravka, Zhirnovsky District, Volgograd Oblast =

Zhuravka Журавка
- Khutor
- Location within Volgograd Oblast Location within Russia
- Coordinates: 51°04′N 44°41′E
- Country: Russia
- Region: Volgograd Oblast
- District: Zhirnovsky District
- Time zone: UTC+4:00

Zhuravka (Russian: Журавка) is a rural locality (a khutor) in Alexandrovskoye Rural Settlement, Zhirnovsky District, Volgograd Oblast, Russia. The population was 60 as of 2010.

== Geography ==
Zhuravka is located on the right bank of the Medveditsa River, 19 km northwest of Zhirnovsk (the district's administrative centre) by road. Alexandrovka is the nearest rural locality.
