= Grechikhino =

Grechikhino Гречихино
- Selo
- Location within Volgograd Oblast Location within Russia
- Coordinates: 51°09′N 44°48′E
- Country: Russia
- Region: Volgograd Oblast
- District: Zhirnovsky District
- Time zone: UTC+4:00

Grechikhino (Russian: Гречихино) is a rural locality (a selo) in Medveditskoye Rural Settlement, Zhirnovsky District, Volgograd Oblast, Russia. The population was 80 as of 2010. There are 3 streets.

== Geography ==
Grechikhino is located in steppe of Volga Upland, on the right bank of the Medveditsa River, 22 km north of Zhirnovsk (the district's administrative centre) by road. Bolshaya Knyazevka is the nearest rural locality.
