= Yershovka, Volgograd Oblast =

Yershovka Ершовка
- Selo
- Location within Volgograd Oblast Location within Russia
- Coordinates: 51°09′N 44°19′E
- Country: Russia
- Region: Volgograd Oblast
- District: Zhirnovsky District
- Time zone: UTC+4:00

Yershovka (Russian: Ершо́вка) is a rural locality (a selo) in Zhirnovsky District, Klenovskoye Rural Settlement, Volgograd Oblast, Russia. The population was 228 as of 2010. There are 7 streets.

== Geography ==
Yershovka is located in forest steppe of Khopyorsko-Buzulukskaya Plain, 52 km northwest of Zhirnovsk (the district's administrative centre) by road. Romanovka is the nearest rural locality.
