= Tarapatino =

Tarapatino Тарапатино
- Selo
- Location within Volgograd Oblast Location within Russia
- Coordinates: 50°56′N 44°32′E
- Country: Russia
- Region: Volgograd Oblast
- District: Zhirnovsky District
- Time zone: UTC+4:00

Tarapatino (Russian: Тарапатино) is a rural locality (a selo) and the administrative center of Tarapatinskoye Rural Settlement, Zhirnovsky District, Volgograd Oblast, Russia. The population was 324 in 2010. There are six streets.

== Geography ==
Tarapatino is located in steppe of Volga Upland, on the left bank of the Shchelkan River, 32 kilometres (20 mi) west of Zhirnovsk (the district's administrative centre) by road. Osichki is the nearest rural locality.
