= Teterevyatka =

Teterevyatka Тетеревятка
- Selo
- Location within Volgograd Oblast Location within Russia
- Coordinates: 50°39′N 45°08′E
- Country: Russia
- Region: Volgograd Oblast
- District: Zhirnovsky District
- Time zone: UTC+4:00

Teterevyatka (Russian: Тетеревятка) is a rural locality (a selo) and the administrative center of Teterevyatskoye Rural Settlement, Zhirnovsky District, Volgograd Oblast, Russia. The population was 392 as of 2010. There are 8 streets.

== Geography ==
Teterevyatka is located 71 km southeast of Zhirnovsk (the district's administrative centre) by road. Borodachi is the nearest rural locality.
