= Bolshaya Knyazevka =

Bolshaya Knyazevka Большая Князевка
- Selo
- Location within Volgograd Oblast Location within Russia
- Coordinates: 51°07′N 44°45′E
- Country: Russia
- Region: Volgograd Oblast
- District: Zhirnovsky District
- Time zone: UTC+4:00

Bolshaya Knyazevka (Russian: Большая Князевка) is a rural locality (a selo) in Alexandrovskoye Rural Settlement, Zhirnovsky District, Volgograd Oblast, Russia. The population was 139 as of 2010. There are six streets.

== Geography ==
Bolshaya Knyazevka is on the right bank of the Medveditsa River, 25 km north of Zhirnovsk (the district's administrative centre) by road. Novaya Bakhmetyevka is the nearest rural locality.
