= Chizhi =

Chizhi Чижи
- Selo
- Location within Volgograd Oblast Location within Russia
- Coordinates: 50°37′N 45°00′E
- Country: Russia
- Region: Volgograd Oblast
- District: Zhirnovsky District
- Time zone: UTC+4:00

Chizhi (Russian: Чижи) is a rural locality (a selo) in Borodachyovskoye Rural Settlement, Zhirnovsky District, Volgograd Oblast, Russia. The population was 36 as of 2010. There are 2 streets.

== Geography ==
Chizhi is located in forest steppe of Volga Upland, 61 km south of Zhirnovsk (the district's administrative centre) by road. Borodachi is the nearest rural locality.
