= Novinka, Volgograd Oblast =

Novinka Новинка
- Selo
- Location within Volgograd Oblast Location within Russia
- Coordinates: 51°01′N 45°08′E
- Country: Russia
- Region: Volgograd Oblast
- District: Zhirnovsky District
- Time zone: UTC+4:00

Novinka (Russian: Новинка) is a rural locality (a selo) in Alyoshnikovskoye Rural Settlement, Zhirnovsky District, Volgograd Oblast, Russia. The population was 462 as of 2010. There are 7 streets.

== Geography ==
Novinka is located in forest steppe of Volga Upland, 54 km northeast of Zhirnovsk (the district's administrative centre) by road. Pogranichnoye is the nearest rural locality.
