= Vishnyovoye, Volgograd Oblast =

Vishnyovoye Вишнёвое
- Selo
- Location within Volgograd Oblast Location within Russia
- Coordinates: 50°45′N 45°15′E
- Country: Russia
- Region: Volgograd Oblast
- District: Zhirnovsky District
- Time zone: UTC+4:00

Vishnyovoye (Russian: Вишнёвое) is a rural locality (a selo) in Verkhnedobrinskoye Rural Settlement, Zhirnovsky District, Volgograd Oblast, Russia. The population was 241 as of 2010. There are 5 streets.

== Geography ==
Vishnyovoye is located on Volga Upland, 87 km southeast of Zhirnovsk (the district's administrative centre) by road. Verkhnyaya Dobrinka is the nearest rural locality.
