= Borodachi =

Borodachi Бородачи
- Selo
- Location within Volgograd Oblast Location within Russia
- Coordinates: 50°39′N 44°57′E
- Country: Russia
- Region: Volgograd Oblast
- District: Zhirnovsky District
- Time zone: UTC+4:00

Borodachi (Russian: Бородачи) is a rural locality (a selo) and the administrative center of Borodachyovskoye Rural Settlement, Zhirnovsky District, Volgograd Oblast, Russia. The population was 395 as of 2010. There are 5 streets.

== Geography ==
Borodachi is located in forest steppe of Volga Upland, 56 km southeast of Zhirnovsk (the district's administrative centre) by road. Nedostupov is the nearest rural locality.
