= Butyrka, Volgograd Oblast =

Butyrka Бутырка
- Selo
- Location within Volgograd Oblast Location within Russia
- Coordinates: 51°03′N 44°29′E
- Country: Russia
- Region: Volgograd Oblast
- District: Zhirnovsky District
- Time zone: UTC+4:00

Butyrka (Russian: Бутырка) is a rural locality (a selo) in Klenovskoye Rural Settlement, Zhirnovsky District, Volgograd Oblast, Russia. The population was 327 as of 2010. There are 5 streets.

== Geography ==
Butyrka is located on Khopyorsko-Buzulukskaya Plain, on the left bank of the Shchelkan River, 38 km northwest of Zhirnovsk (the district's administrative centre) by road. Lemeshkino is the nearest rural locality.
