= Aleshniki =

Aleshniki Алешники
- Selo
- Location within Volgograd Oblast Location within Russia
- Coordinates: 50°53′N 45°10′E
- Country: Russia
- Region: Volgograd Oblast
- District: Zhirnovsky District
- Time zone: UTC+4:00

Aleshniki (Russian: Алёшники) is a rural locality (a selo) and the administrative center of Alyoshnikovskoye Rural Settlement, Zhirnovsky District, Volgograd Oblast, Russia. The population was 852 as of 2010. There are 9 streets.

== Geography ==
Aleshniki is located in forest steppe, on Volga Upland, 39 km southeast of Zhirnovsk (the district's administrative centre) by road. Podchinny is the nearest rural locality.
