= Fomyonkovo =

Fomyonkovo Фомёнково
- Selo
- Location within Volgograd Oblast Location within Russia
- Coordinates: 50°39′N 44°39′E
- Country: Russia
- Region: Volgograd Oblast
- District: Zhirnovsky District
- Time zone: UTC+4:00

Fomyonkovo (Russian: Фомёнково) is a rural locality (a selo) in Krasnoyarskoye Rural Settlement, Zhirnovsky District, Volgograd Oblast, Russia. The population was 92 as of 2010. There are 5 streets.

== Geography ==
Fomyonkovo is located on the bank of the Medveditsa River, 46 km south of Zhirnovsk (the district's administrative centre) by road. Krasny Yar is the nearest rural locality.
