= Fyodorovka, Zhirnovsky District, Volgograd Oblast =

Fyodorovka Фёдоровка
- Selo
- Location within Volgograd Oblast Location within Russia
- Coordinates: 51°09′N 44°29′E
- Country: Russia
- Region: Volgograd Oblast
- District: Zhirnovsky District
- Time zone: UTC+4:00

Fyodorovka (Russian: Фёдоровка) is a rural locality (a selo) in Klenovskoye Rural Settlement, Zhirnovsky District, Volgograd Oblast, Russia. The population was 216 as of 2010. There are 2 streets.

== Geography ==
Fyodorovka is located in steppe of Khopyorsko-Buzulukskaya Plain, on the left bank of the Shchelkan River, 38 km northwest of Zhirnovsk (the district's administrative centre) by road. Klyonovka is the nearest rural locality.
