= Nizhnyaya Dobrinka =

Nizhnyaya Dobrinka Нижняя Добринка
- Selo
- Location within Volgograd Oblast Location within Russia
- Coordinates: 50°50′N 44°43′E
- Country: Russia
- Region: Volgograd Oblast
- District: Zhirnovsky District
- Time zone: UTC+4:00

Nizhnyaya Dobrinka (Russian: Ни́жняя До́бринка) is a rural locality (a selo) and the administrative center of Nizhnedobrinskoye Rural Settlement, Zhirnovsky District, Volgograd Oblast, Russia. The population was 1,484 as of 2010. There are 18 streets.

== Geography ==
Nizhnyaya Dobrinka is located on the left bank of the Medveditsa River, 24 km south of Zhirnovsk (the district's administrative centre) by road. Yegorovka-na-Medveditse is the nearest rural locality.
