= Zhirnovsky =

Zhirnovsky (masculine), Zhirnovskaya (feminine), or Zhirnovskoye (neuter) may refer to:

- Zhirnovsky District, a district of Volgograd Oblast, Russia
- Zhirnovskoye Urban Settlement, several municipal urban settlements in Russia
- Zhirnovsky (rural locality), a rural locality (a settlement) in Kursk Oblast, Russia
