= Petrov Val =

Town in Volgograd Oblast, Russia

Petrov Val Петров Вал
- Town
- Interactive map of Petrov Val
- Location of Petrov Val Petrov Val (Volgograd Oblast)
- Coordinates: 50°09′N 45°13′E
- Country: Russia
- Federal subject: Volgograd Oblast
- Administrative district: Kamyshinsky District
- Town of district significanceSelsoviet: Petrov Val
- Founded: 1942
- Town status since: 1988

Population (2010 Census)
  - Total: 13,239
  - Estimate (2021): 12,526 (−5.4%)

Administrative status
  - Capital of: town of district significance of Petrov Val

Municipal status
  - Municipal district: Kamyshinsky Municipal District
  - Urban settlement: Petrov Val Urban Settlement
  - Capital of: Petrov Val Urban Settlement
- Time zone: UTC+3 (MSK)
- Postal code: 403840
- OKTMO ID: 18618103001
- Website: admpwal.ru

Petrov Val (Russian: Петро́в Вал) is a town in Kamyshinsky District of Volgograd Oblast, Russia, located on the left bank of the Ilovlya River (a tributary of the Don), 185 kilometers (115 mi) north of Volgograd, the administrative center of the oblast. Population: 13,239 (2010 census); 14,721 (2002 census); 13,752 (1989 Soviet census).

== History ==
Early settlement in Petrov Val is date back to Don–Volga portage.the city is in the path of shortest path between Volga and Don River. Peter the Great decided to construct a canal between, Petrov Val Canal between Ilovlya and the Kamyshinka Rivers, and the city has been named in his honor. It was granted urban-type settlement status in 1949 and town status in 1988.

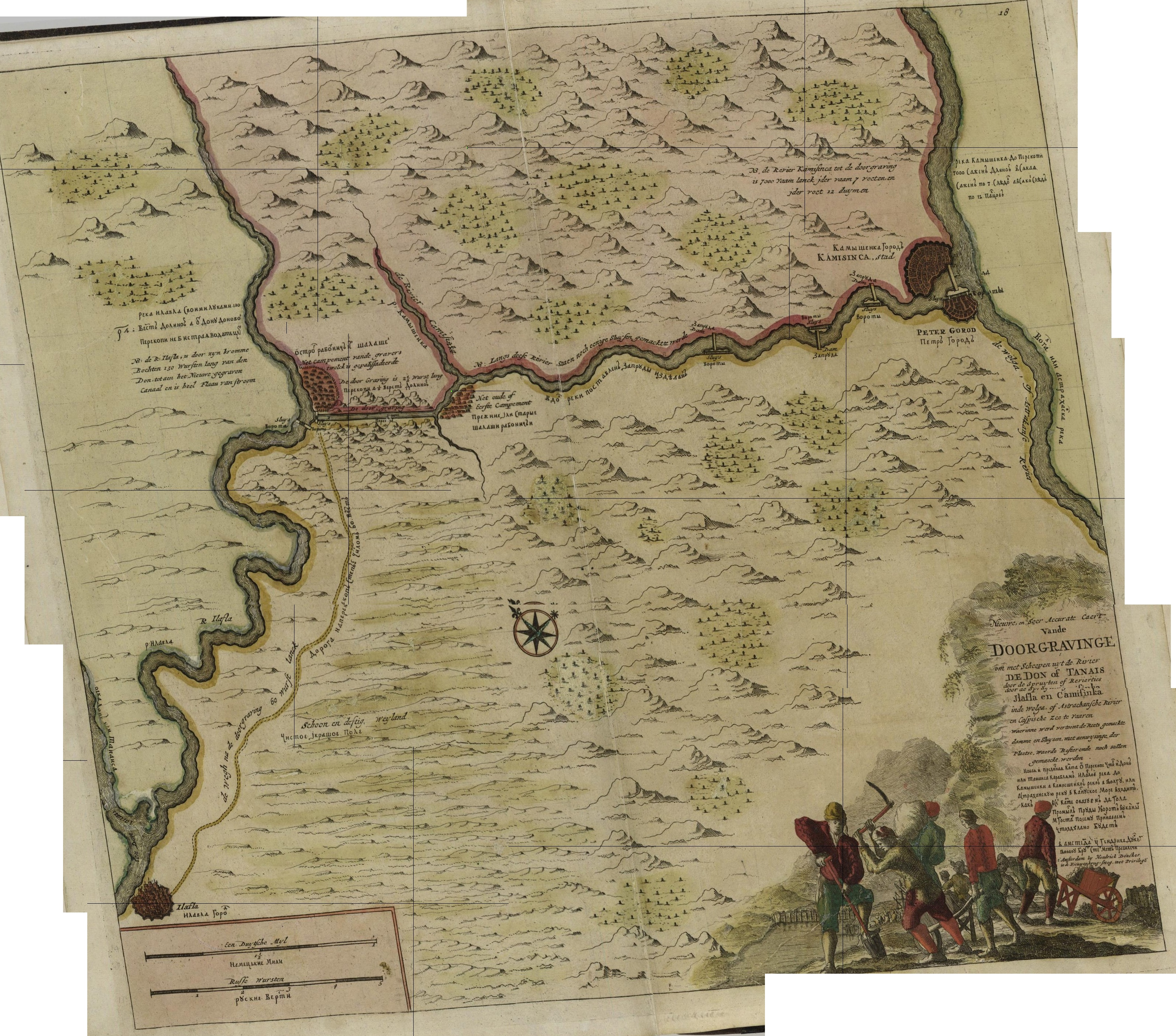
Petrov Val Canal

== Administrative and municipal status ==
Within the framework of administrative divisions, it is, together with the settlement of Avilovsky, incorporated within Kamyshinsky District as the town of district significance of Petrov Val. As a municipal division, the town of district significance of Petrov Val is incorporated within Kamyshinsky Municipal District as Petrov Val Urban Settlement.
