= EGTC (disambiguation) =

EGTC can represent:

- EGTC, the International Civil Aviation Organization airport code for Cranfield Airport in England
- EGTC, a European grouping of territorial cooperation
- EGTC, the transliterated Russian acronym for the Unified Deep Water System of European Russia
