= Medveditsky =

Medveditsky Медведицкий
- Urban-type settlement
- Interactive map of Medveditsky
- Location of Medveditsky Medveditsky (Volgograd Oblast)
- Coordinates: 50.7853°N 44.7126°E
- Country: Russia
- Federal subject: Volgograd Oblast
- Administrative district: Zhirnovsky District

Population (2010 Census)
  - Total: 1,298
  - Estimate (2021): 1,023 (−21.2%)
- Time zone: UTC+3 (MSK)
- Postal codes: 412572, 403772
- OKTMO ID: 18612173051

Medveditsky (Russian: Медведицкий) is an urban locality (an urban-type settlement) in Zhirnovsky District of Volgograd Oblast, Russia. Population: 1,298 (2010 census); 1,472 (2002 census); 1,451 (1989 Soviet census).
