= Krasny Yar, Volgograd Oblast =

Krasny Yar Красный Яр
- Urban-type settlement
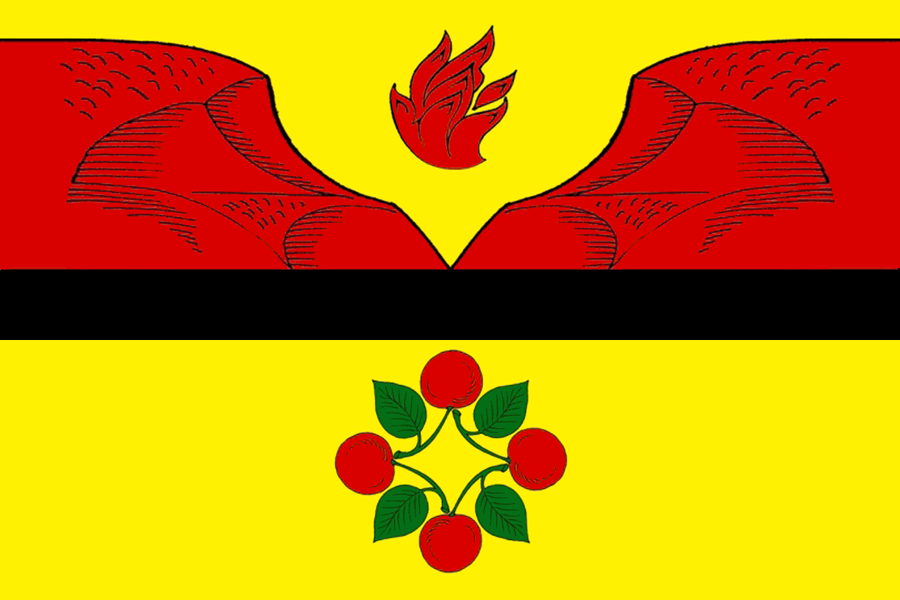
- Flag
- Interactive map of Krasny Yar
- Location of Krasny Yar Krasny Yar (Volgograd Oblast)
- Coordinates: 50.6998°N 44.7263°E
- Country: Russia
- Federal subject: Volgograd Oblast
- Administrative district: Zhirnovsky District

Population (2010 Census)
  - Total: 6,992
  - Estimate (2021): 5,738 (−17.9%)
- Time zone: UTC+3 (MSK)
- Postal code: 403780
- OKTMO ID: 18612157051

Krasny Yar (Russian: Кра́сный Яр) is an urban locality (an urban-type settlement) in Zhirnovsky District of Volgograd Oblast, Russia. Population: 6,992 (2010 census); 7,710 (2002 census); 7,466 (1989 Soviet census).
