= Volga–Don Canal =

Canal in Russia

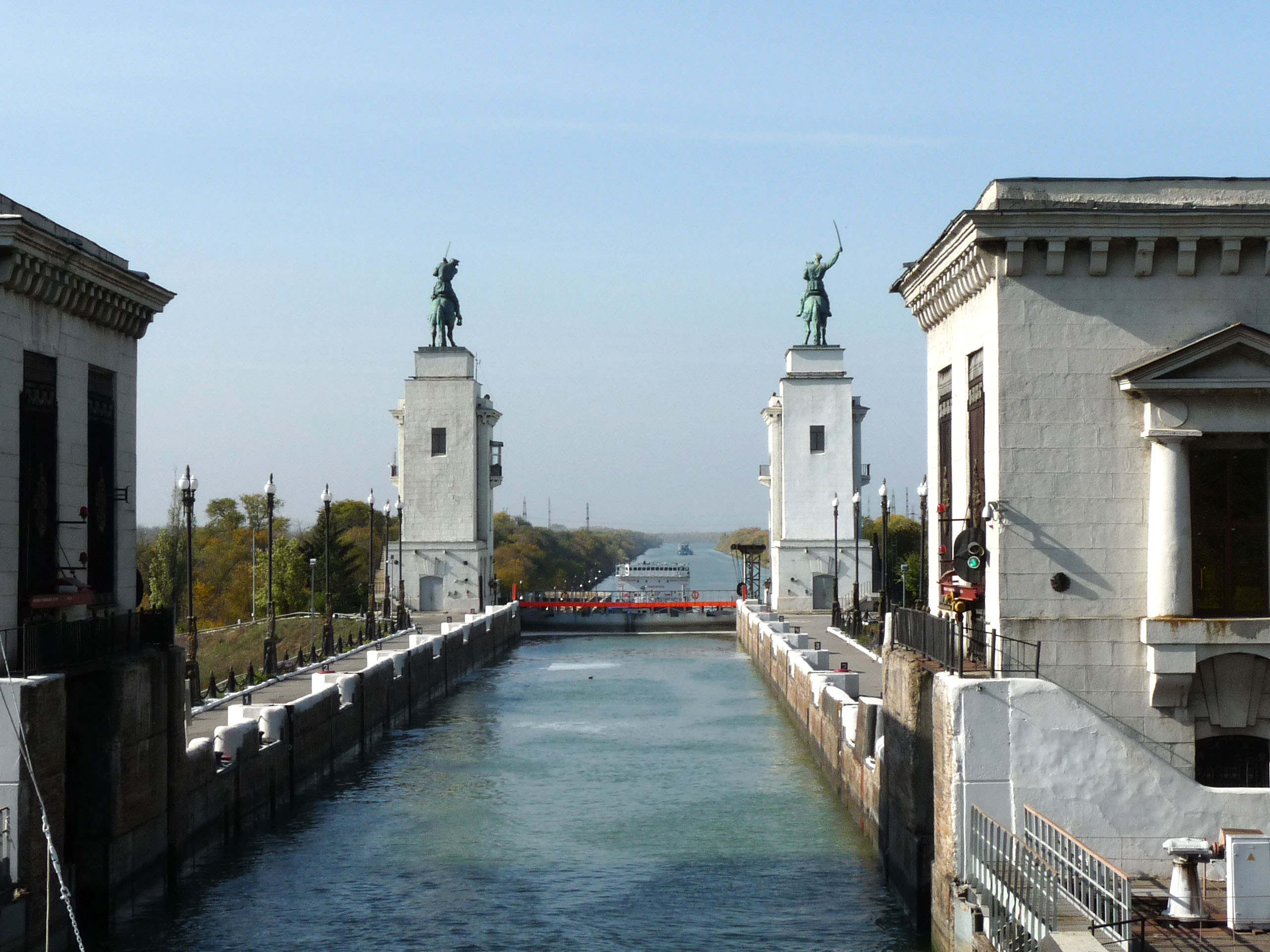
- Volga–Don Canal in October 2009

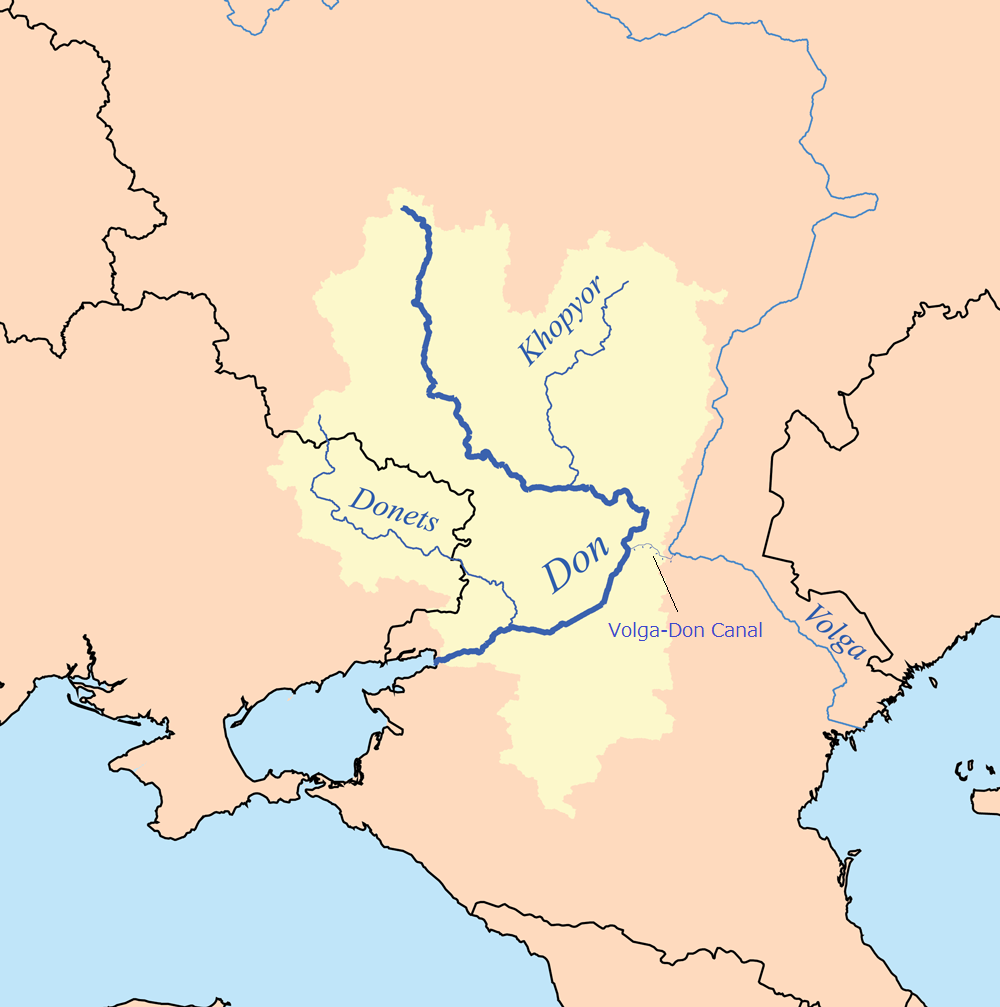
- Volga–Don Canal map
- Interactive map of Volga–Don Canal

Specifications
- Length: 63 miles (101 km)
- Maximum boat length: 141 m (463 ft)
- Maximum boat beam: 16.8 m (55 ft)
- Maximum boat draft: 3.6 m (12 ft)
- Locks: 13
- Maximum height AMSL: 144 ft (44 m)
- Status: Open

History
- Construction began: 1948
- Date of first use: 1 June 1952
- Date completed: 1952

Geography
- Start point: Volgograd, Russia
- End point: Tsimlyansk Reservoir, near Volgodonsk, Russia
- Beginning coordinates: 48°37′21″N 43°32′06″E
- Ending coordinates: 48°31′21″N 44°33′09″E

Lenin Volga–Don Shipping Canal (Russian: Волго-Донской судоходный канал имени В. И. Ленина, Volga-Donskoy sudokhodniy kanal imeni V. I. Lenina, abbreviated ВДСК, VDSK) is a ship canal in Russia. It connects the Volga and the Don at their closest points. Opened in 1952, its length is 101 km (63 mi), 45 km (28 mi) of which is through rivers and reservoirs.

The canal forms a part of the Unified Deep Water System of European Russia. Together with the lower Volga and the lower Don, the canal provides the shortest navigable connection between the Caspian Sea and the world's oceans via the Sea of Azov, the Black Sea, and the Mediterranean Sea.

== History ==
There has been a trade and military route between the Volga and Don rivers since 400 BC.

The presence of the fortified settlement Tanais in the Don River delta since the time of the Bosporan Kingdom, c. 438 BC– 370 AD, strongly suggests the route was sufficiently notable to be fortified for over two thousand years. The Sarkel fortress on the left bank of the lower Don was the main control of this Volga trade route.

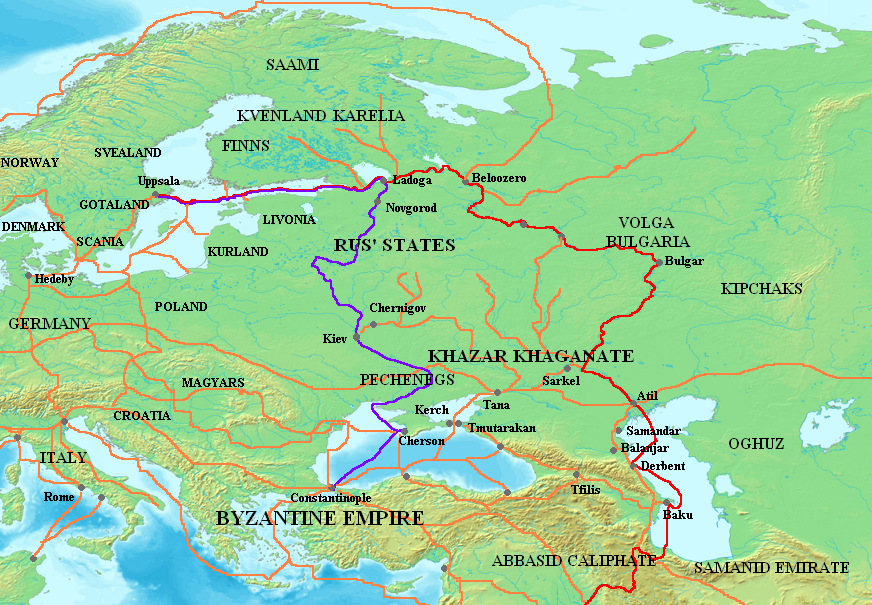
Sarkel and Tanais on the Volga trade route

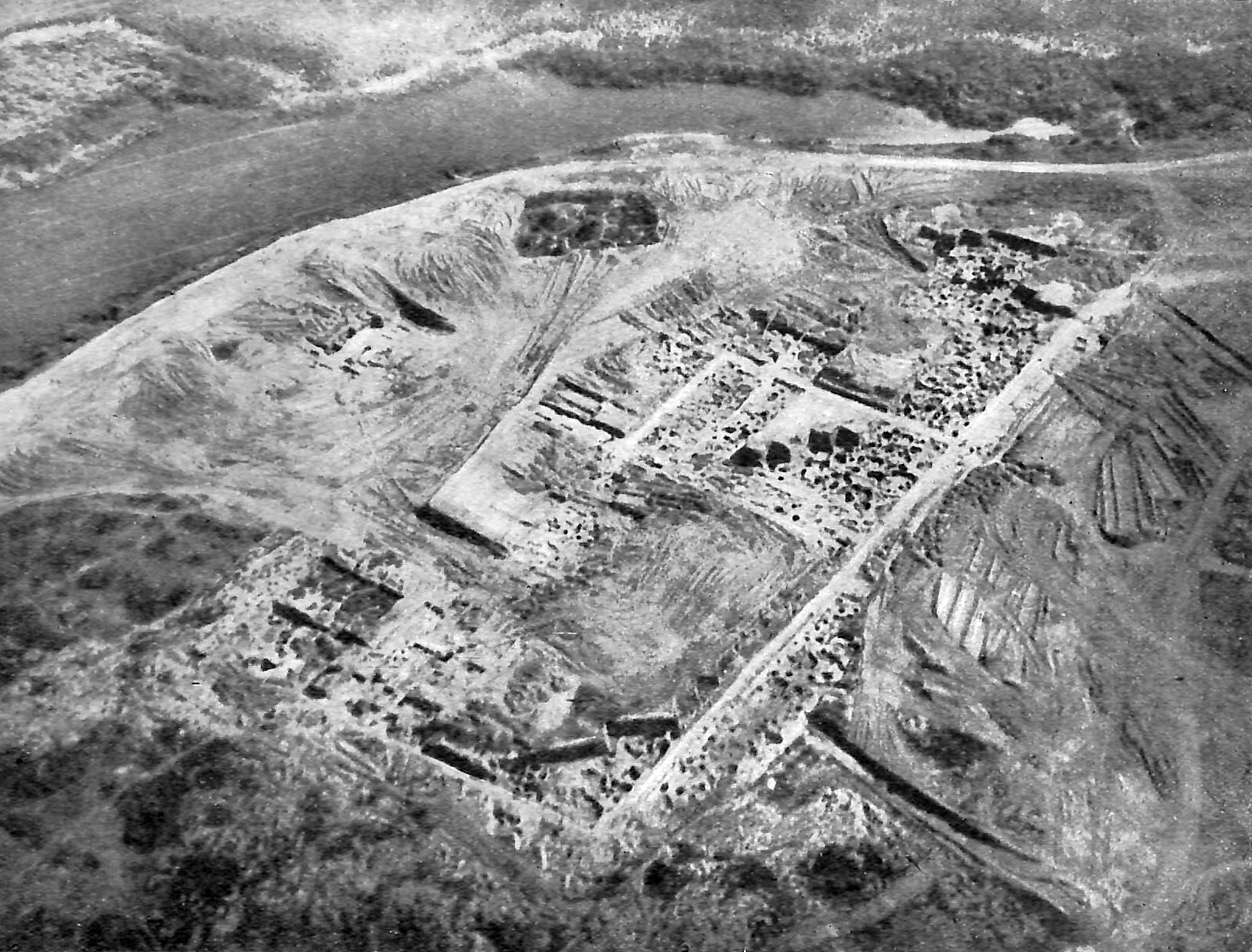
Sarkel fortress

The Don–Volga portage got its name from its trade importance 1000 years ago. There were several attempts to build a canal to replace the portage after 1500, first by the Ottomans during the 16th century, then by the Russian Empire in the 17th and 18th centuries, and finally, more successfully, by the Soviet Union in the 20th.

In 1569, the Ottoman Empire attempted to connect the Volga and Don rivers via a canal. The Ottomans wanted to create a maritime link to Central Asia (especially the cities of Bukhara, Khwarazm and Samarkand) to facilitate trade. Together with a proposed Suez Canal, the Volga–Don canal would also allow Central Asian Muslims to perform pilgrimage to Mecca. According to most historians, the Ottomans managed to dig one-third of the canal before work was abandoned because of adverse weather. Other historians argue that the Ottomans merely leveled the ground so they could haul ships between the two rivers. In the end, the Ottomans retreated from the area and Russia promised to respect trade and pilgrimage routes to Central Asia.

Peter the Great ordered the earliest Russian attempts to connect the Volga and Don rivers. After capturing Azov in 1696, he decided to build a canal — later named Petrov Val — on the Ilovlya River (a left tributary of the Don) and the Kamyshinka river (right tributary of the Volga). It was much shorter than the modern canal, connecting a gap of just 4 kilometers (2.5 mi), but was abandoned in 1701 because of a lack of resources and other problems. He initiated a second attempt, the so-called Ivanovsky Canal between Yepifan and Ivan-Ozero, under the administration of Knyaz Matvey Gagarin. However it was too shallow, as it linked the upper Don and the upper Volga via the tributaries Oka River, Upa River, and Shat River in present-day Tula Oblast. Between 1702 and 1707, twenty-four locks were constructed, and in 1707, about 300 ships passed through with difficulty. In 1709 owing to financial difficulties from the Great Northern War, the project was halted.

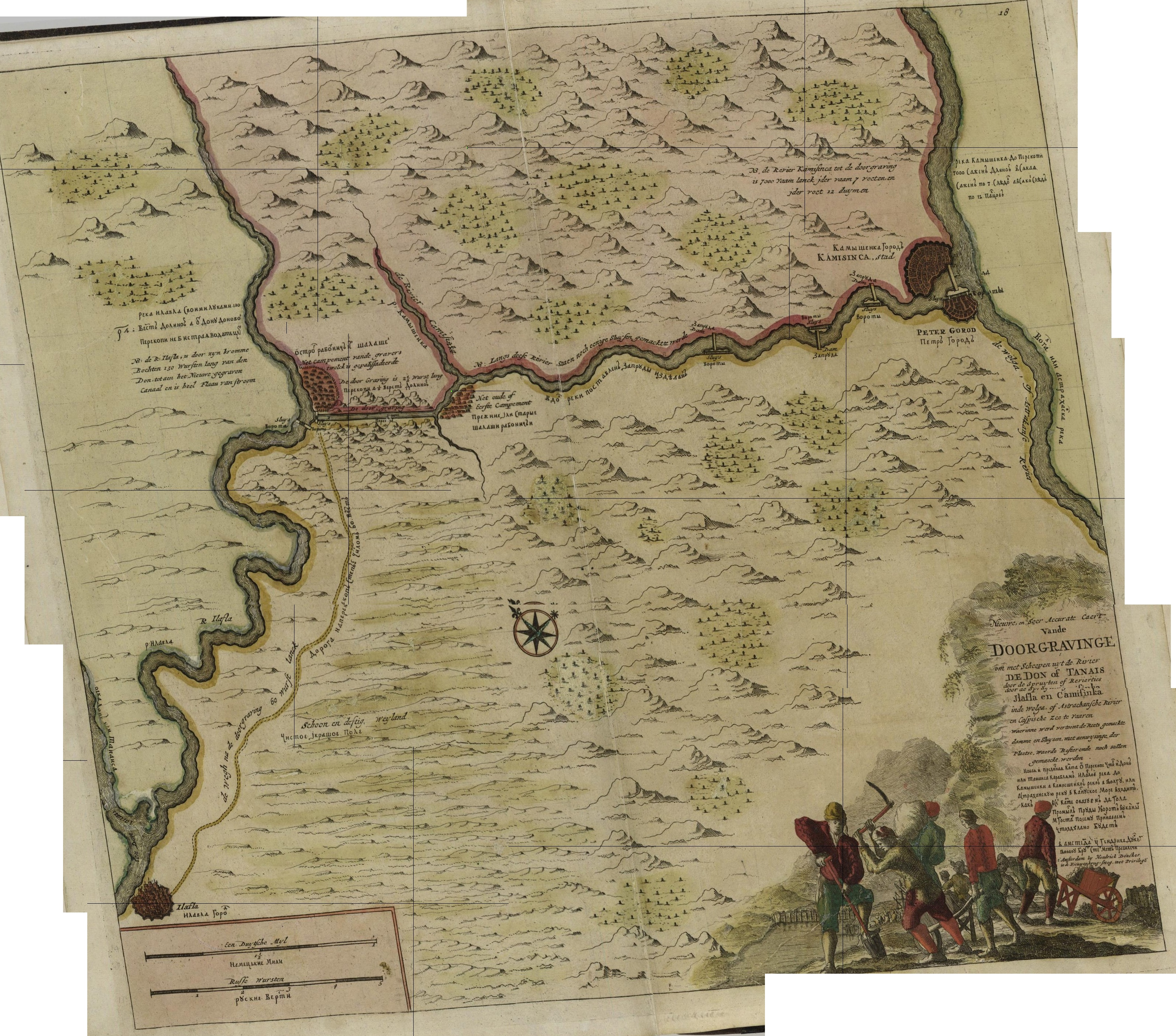
Petrov Val canal

In 1711 Russia left Azov under the terms of the Treaty of the Pruth, and Peter the Great lost all interest in the canal, which was abandoned and fell into ruin. Over time, other projects for connecting the two rivers were proposed, but none were attempted. However, the horse-drawn Dubovsko-Kachalinsky railway and the Volga–Don railway — now part of the South Eastern Railway — were built in 1846 and 1852, respectively, to link the Volga and the Don at the shortest distance. They were 68km and 73km long respectively.

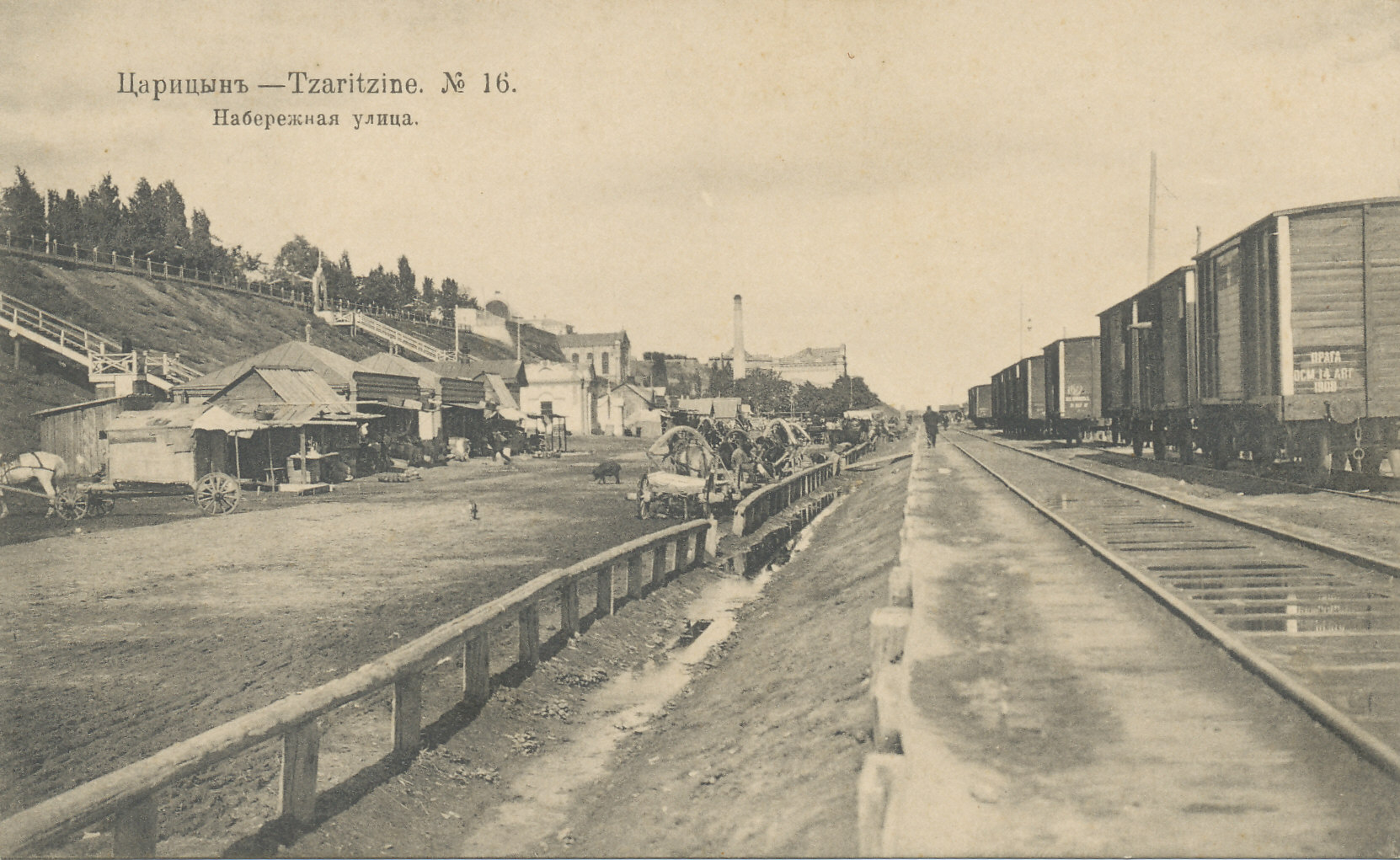
Volga–Don Railway

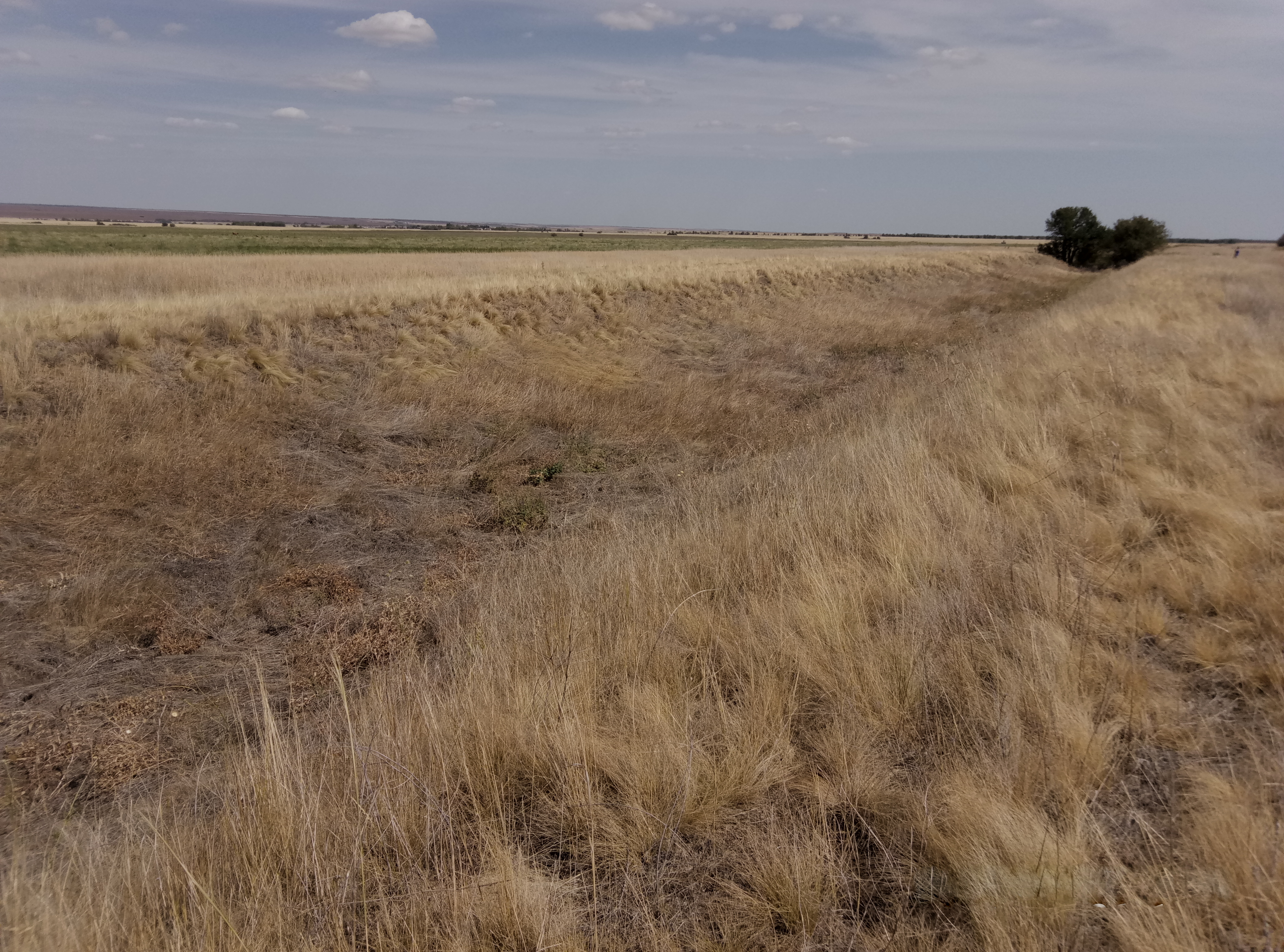
The remains of the Dubovsko-Kachalinsky Railway

The construction of today's Volga–Don Canal, designed by Sergey Zhuk's Hydroproject Institute, began prior to the Second World War, which interrupted the process. In late 1948, the Volga–Don Canal was among the first projects to partake in the reform of the Soviet forced labour system, notably alongside Dalstroy. After these projects introduced a wage for prisoners and other measures to stimulate productivity, they managed to become fully self-financing.

Construction works continued from 1948 to 1952 and the canal was opened on 1 June 1952. The canal and its facilities were built by about 900,000 workers including some 100,000 German POWs and 100,000 gulag prisoners. A day spent at the construction yard was counted as three days in prison, which spurred the prisoners to work. Several convicts were even awarded the Order of the Red Banner of Labour upon their release.

Upon completion, the Volga–Don Canal became an important link in the Unified Deep Water Transportation System of the European part of the USSR.

== Operation ==
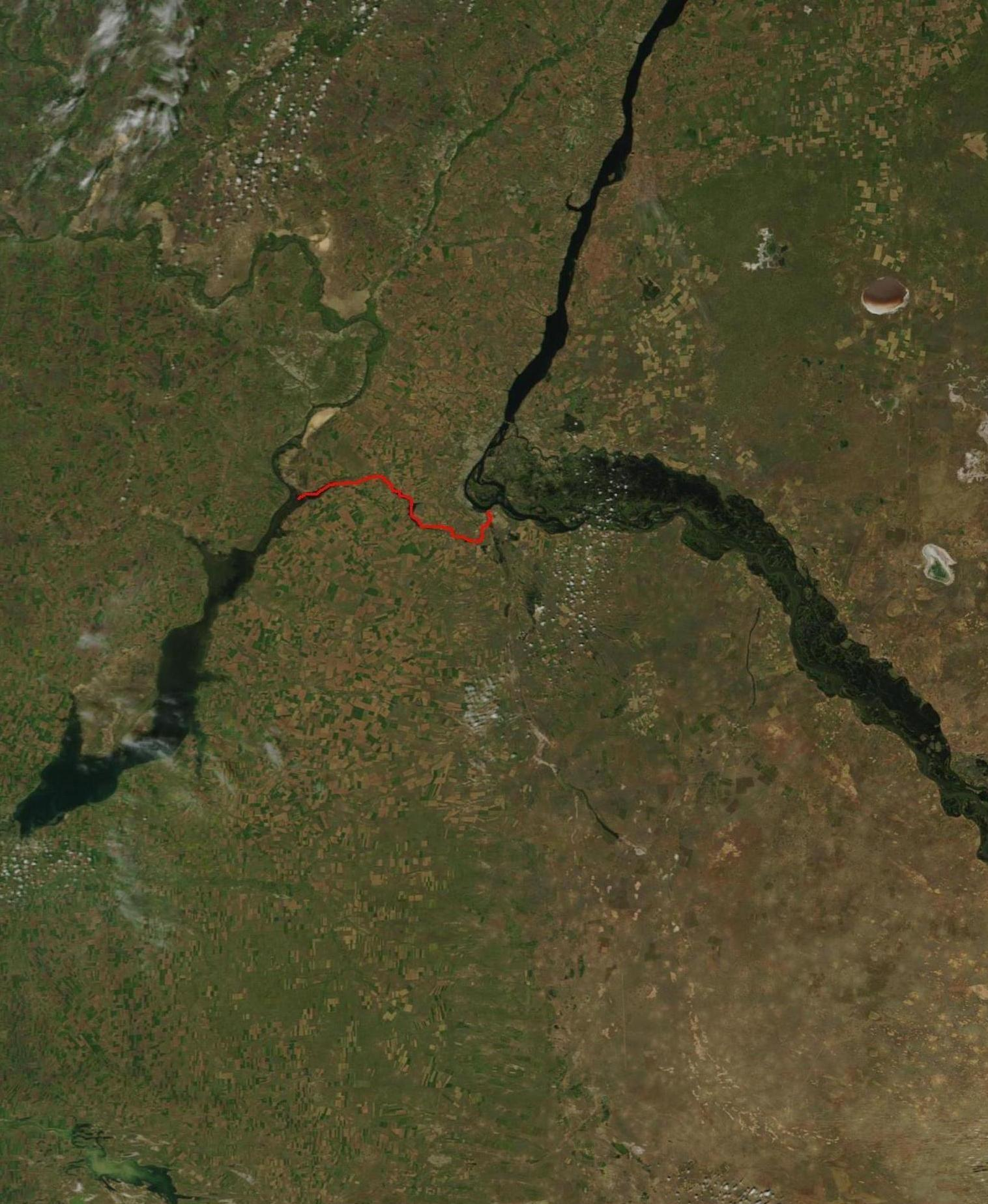
Satellite map of Volga–Don Canal

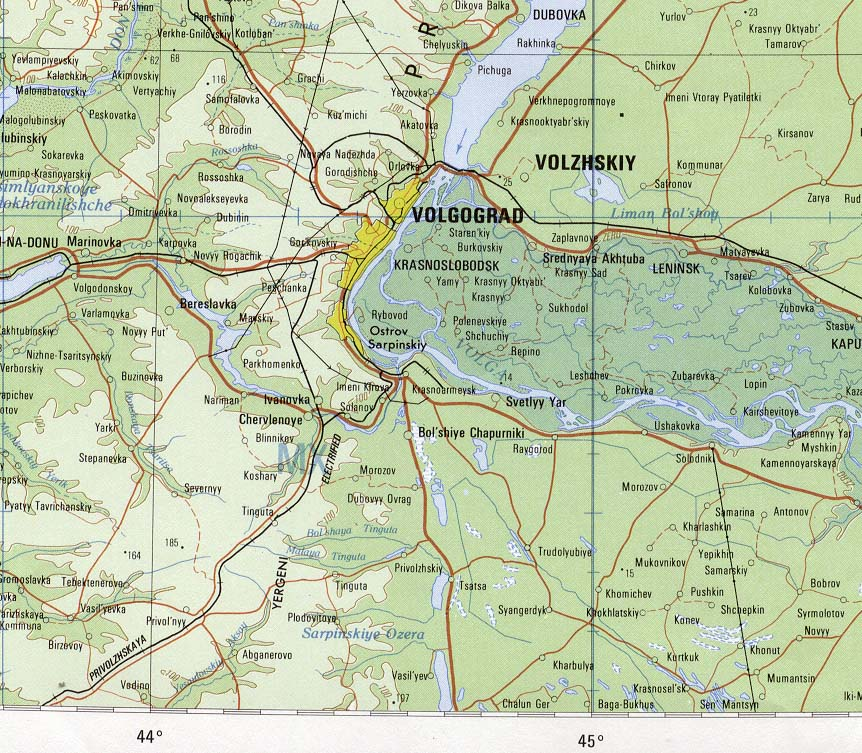
Map of Volga–Don Canal

The canal begins at the Volga's Sarepta backwater (48°31′10″N 44°33′10″E, the location of Lock No. 1 and the gateway arch), south of Volgograd. It ends in the Tsimlyansk Reservoir of the Don at the town of Kalach-na-Donu. The canal's highest elevation is the Varverovskoye (Barbarian) Reservoir between locks 9 and 10, 88 m (289 ft) above the Volga and 44 m (144 ft) above the Don river. It uses nine single-chamber canal locks on the Volga slope to raise and lower ships 88 m (289 ft), and four canal locks of the same kind on the Don slope that raise/lower ships 44 m (144 ft) from river height. The locks are smaller overall than those on the Volga River, but can handle ships of up to 5,000 tonnes cargo capacity.

The smallest locks are 145 m (476 ft) long, 17 m (56 ft) wide, and 3.6 m (12 ft) deep. The maximum allowed vessel is 141 m (463 ft) length, 16.8 m (55 ft) beam, and 3.6 m (12 ft) draught (the Volgo–Don Max Class).

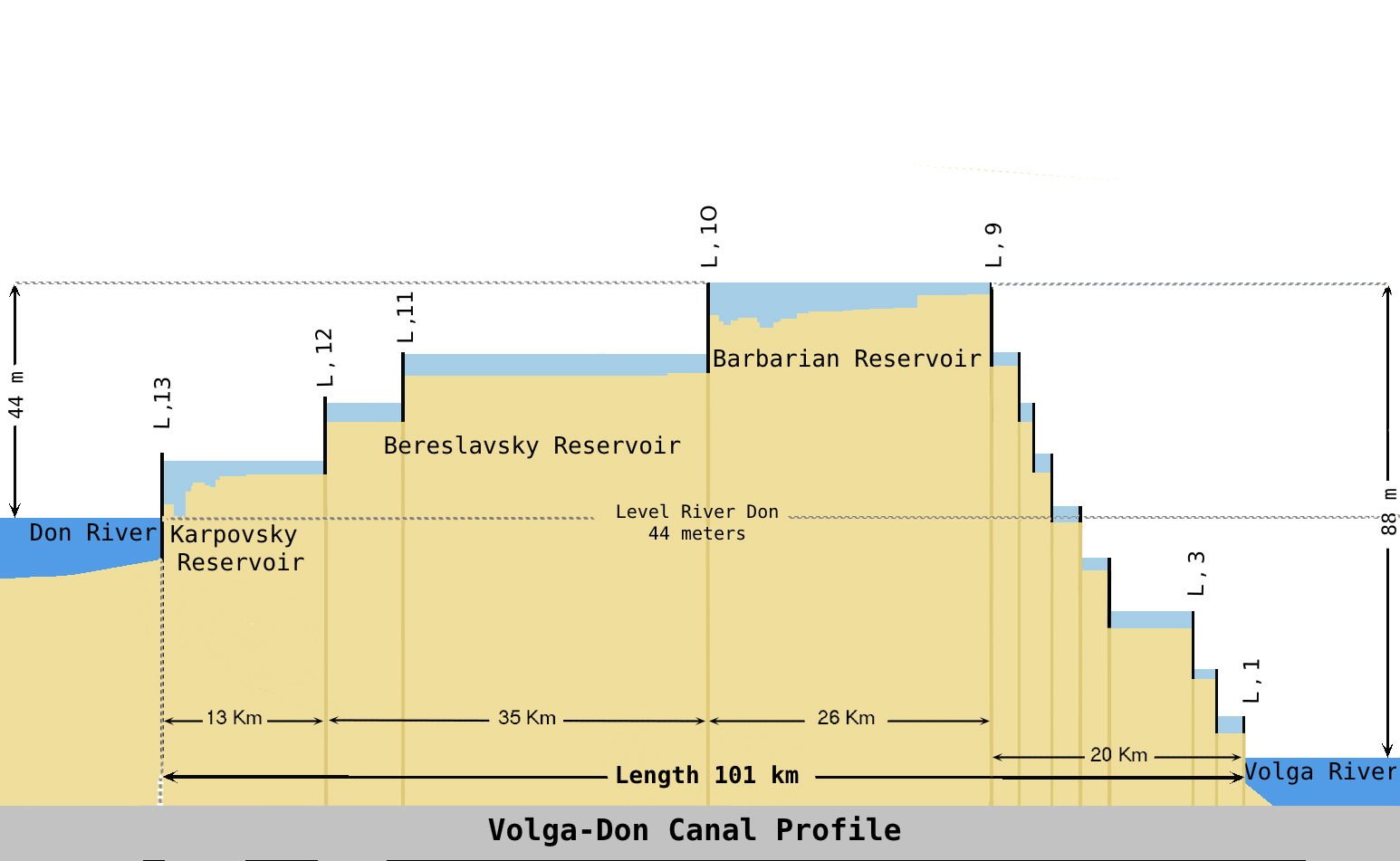
Profile of Volga–Don Canal

The canal is filled from the Don, with three powerful pumping stations to maintain water levels. Water is also taken from the canal for irrigation.

Cargo transported from the Don region to the Volga includes coal from Donetsk in Ukraine, minerals, building materials, and grain. From the Volga to the Don, cargo includes lumber, pyrites, and petroleum products (carried mostly by Volgotanker boats).

Tourist cruisers travel in both directions.

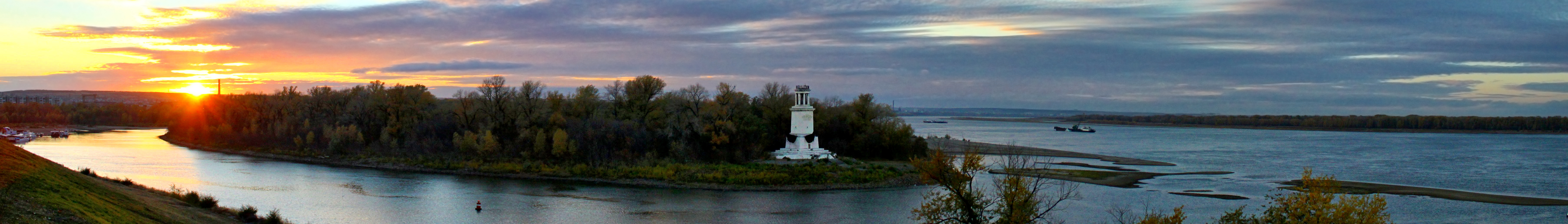
Panorama of the canal in Volgograd
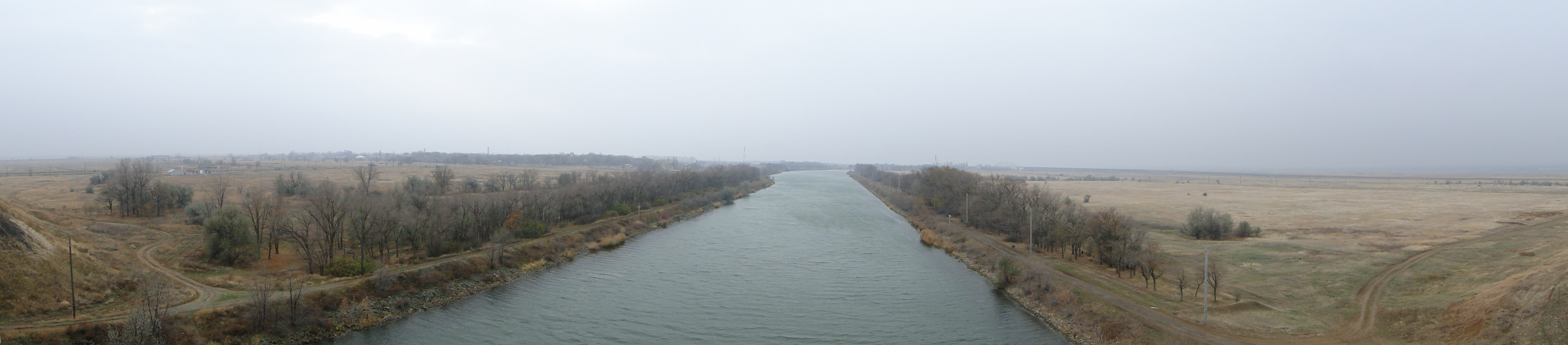
Panorama of the canal in the suburbs of Kalach-na-Donu

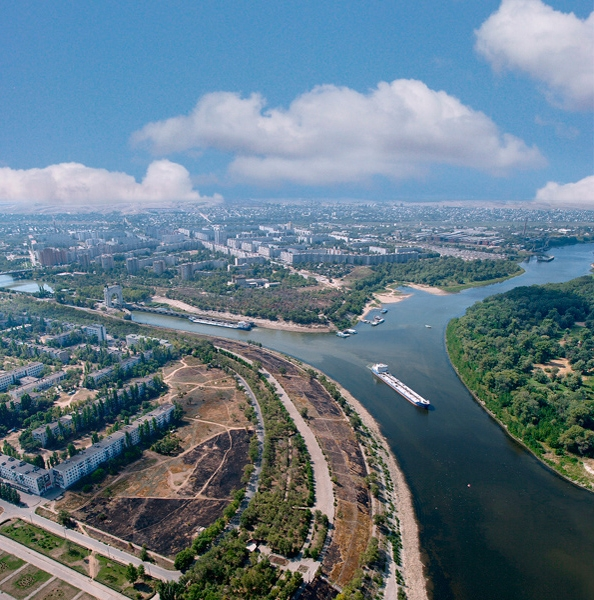
Volga–Don Canal in Volgograd

The canal and the Tsimlyansky water-engineering system (whose chief architect was Leonid Polyakov), form part of an architectural ensemble dedicated to the battles for Tsaritsyn during the Russian Civil War and for Stalingrad during the German-Soviet War.

The Russian classical composer Sergei Prokofiev wrote the tone poem The Meeting of the Volga and the Don to celebrate its completion.

According to the Maritime Board (Morskaya Kollegiya) of the Russian government, 10.9 million tonnes of cargo were carried over the Volga–Don Canal in 2004. An alternative source claims 8.05 million tonnes of cargo was transported through the canal in 2006. Most of the cargo was moved from the east to the west: 7.20 million tonnes, and only 0.85 million tonnes the other way. Just over half of all cargo was oil or oil products (4.14 million tonnes), predominantly shipped from the Caspian region.

It was reported in 2007 that in the first 55 years of the canal's operations 450,000 vessels had passed through carrying 336 million tonnes of cargo. Recent cargo volume stood at 12 million tonnes per year.

In 2016, the core of Belarusian nuclear power plant VVER-1200, which weighed 330 tonnes, was 13 meters high, and 4.5 meters in diameter, was transferred to its destination by exploiting Tsimlyansk Reservoir, the Volga–Don Canal, the Volga–Baltic Waterway, and two other connections.

== Stamp gallery ==
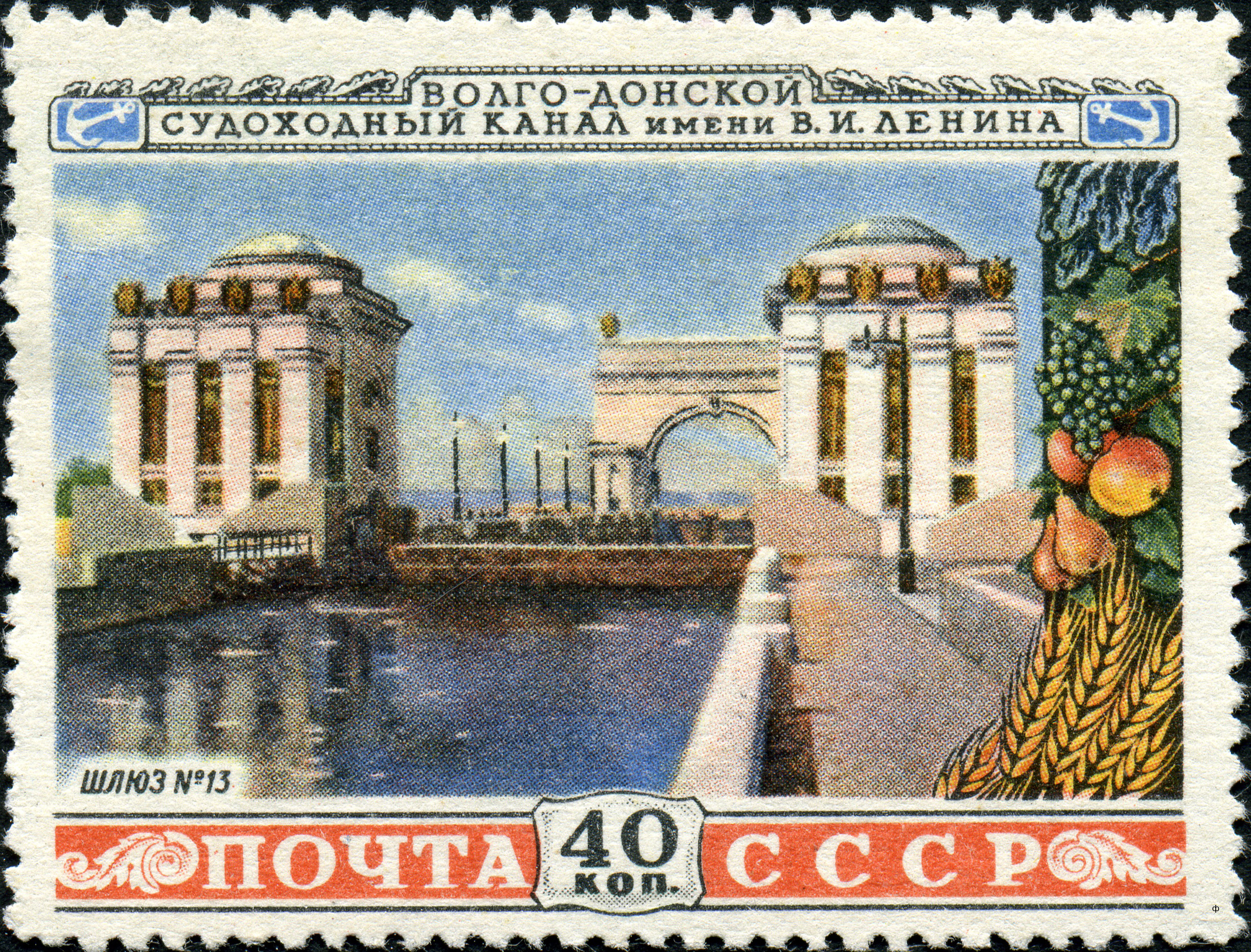
USSR stamp, 1953: Lock No. 13

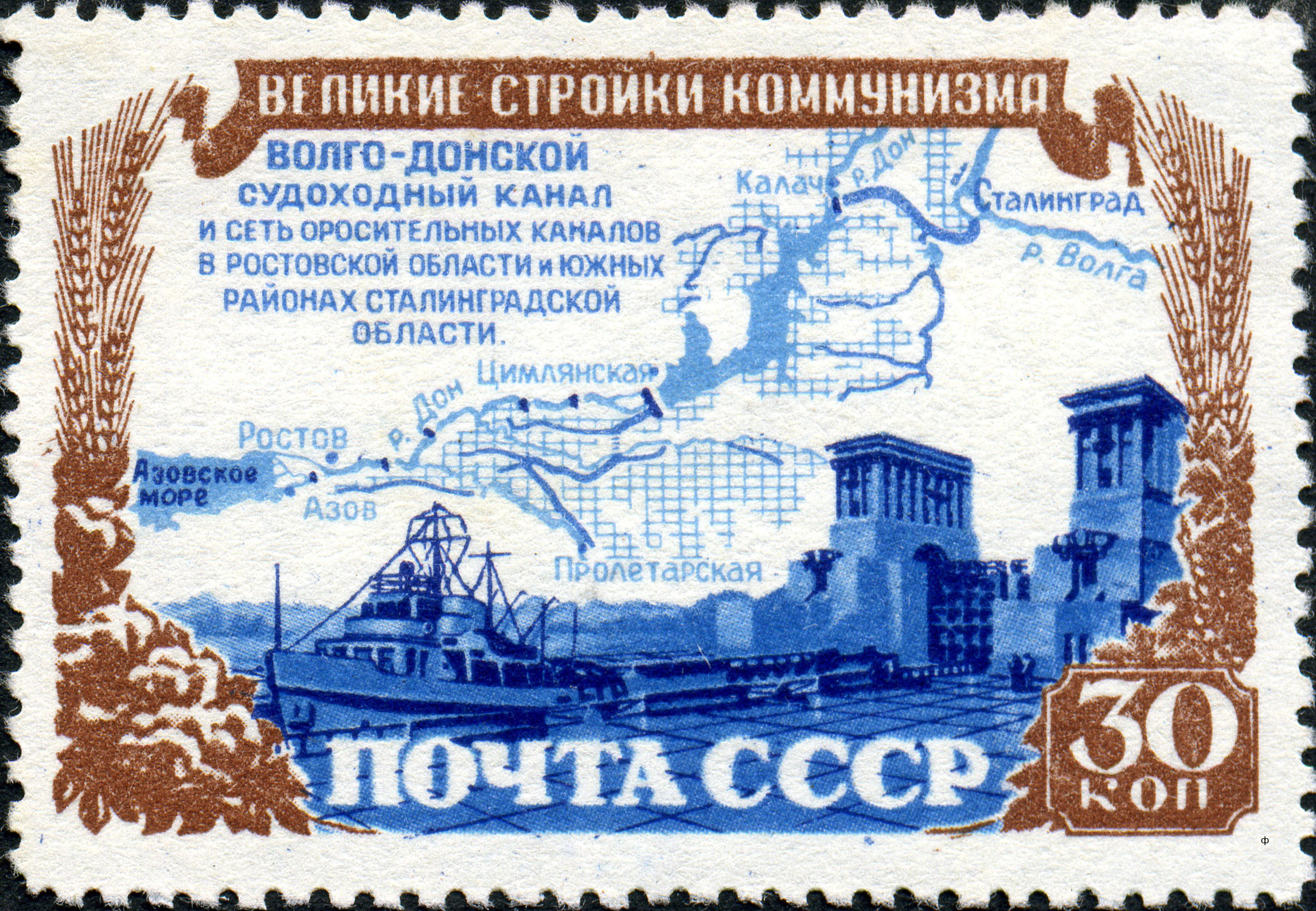
USSR stamp, 1951

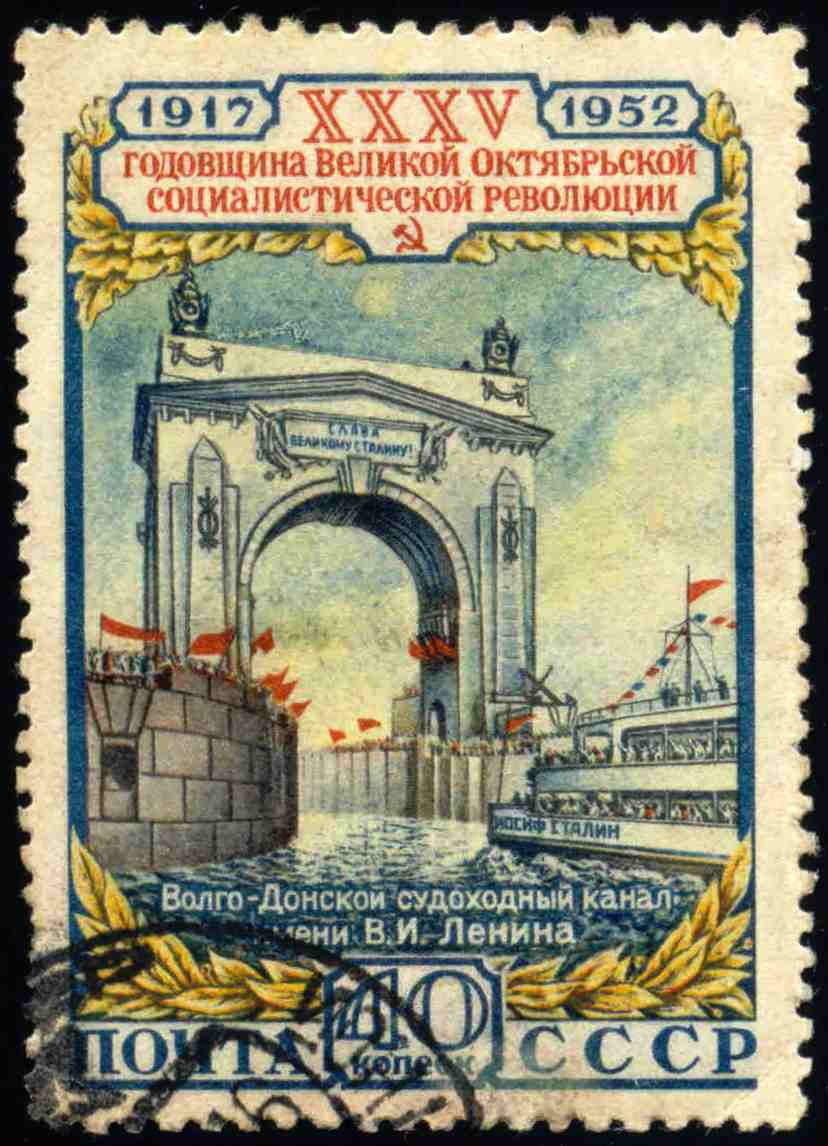
USSR stamp, 1952

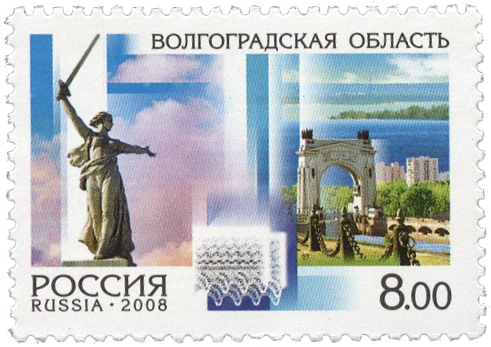
Russia Stamp 2008

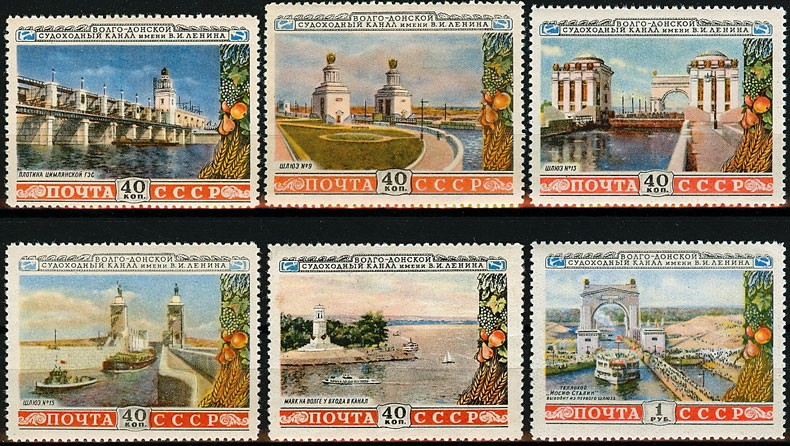
USSR collection

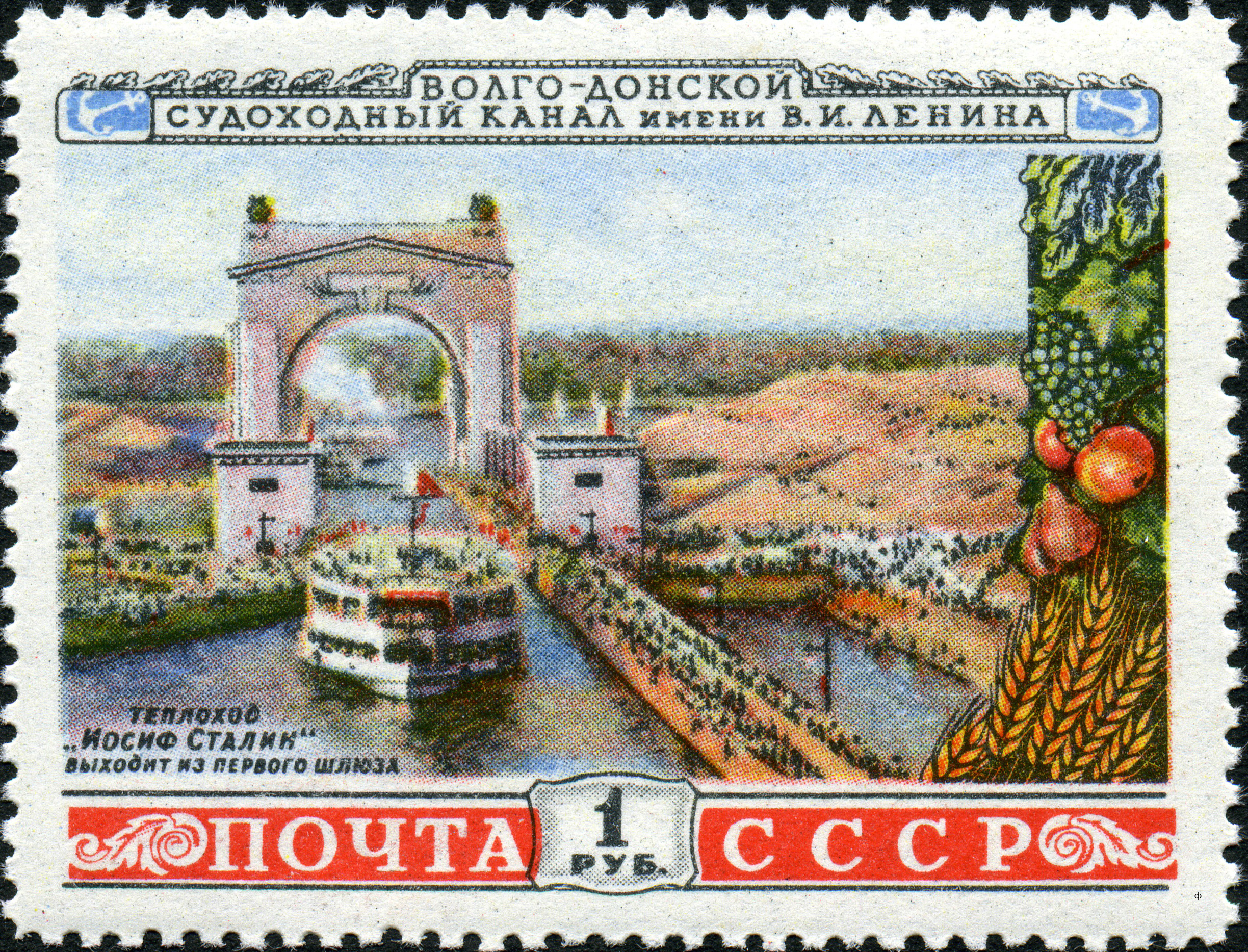
Illustration of a lock on the Volga–Don Canal (1953) (47°33′5.84″N 42°08′10.26″E)

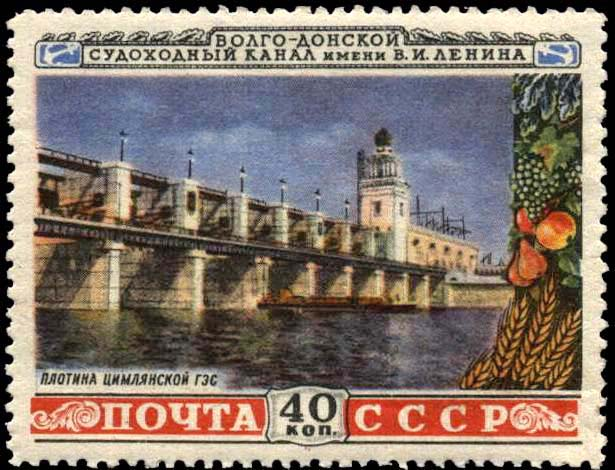
Tsimlyansk hydroelectric power plant (1953)

== Future options ==
In the 1980s, construction started on a second canal between the rivers. The new canal, dubbed Volga–Don 2 (Russian: Волго-Дон 2; 48°56′37″N 44°30′25″E) was to have started from the township of Yerzovka on the Volgograd Reservoir, north (upstream) of the Volga Dam, as opposed to the existing Volga–Don Canal that starts south (downstream) of the dam. This would have reduced the number of locks traversed by ships coming from the Volgograd Reservoir, or from other Volga or Kama ports farther north, on their way to the Don. The project was abruptly cancelled to cut expenditure on 1 August 1990, by which time more than 40 percent of its funds had already been spent. Since then most of the stone and metal in the abandoned canal and locks has been looted.

As of 2007–2008, Russian authorities were considering two options for increasing the throughput of navigable waterways between the Caspian basin and the Black Sea. One option, which reuses the name "Volga–Don 2", is to build a second parallel channel ("second thread") of the Volga–Don Canal, equipped with larger locks 300 metres (980 ft) long. This approach would have allowed for an increase in the canal's annual cargo throughput from 16.5 million tonnes to 30 million tonnes. The other option—which had greater support from Kazakhstan, which would be either canal's major customer—was to build the so-called Eurasia Canal along a more southerly route in the Kuma–Manych Depression, some of which is the much-shallower but existing Manych Ship Canal. The southern route would require less earthwork than the first option and would provide a speedier connection between the Caspian and the Sea of Azov. It would also require fewer locks than the Volga–Don, as elevation differences to be engineered in the Kuma–Manych Depression are smaller.

== Environmental impact ==
The Volga-Don Canal serves as a critical "hotspot" and invasion corridor, facilitating the bidirectional exchange of aquatic fauna between the Azov-Black Sea and Caspian Sea basins. This artificial connection has enabled the northward dispersal of several Ponto-Caspian species into the Volga River system, including the black-striped pipefish (Syngnathus abaster) or longtail dwarf goby (Knipowitschia longecaudata), fundamentally altering the regional biogeography.

== See also ==
- Volgodonsk
- Yergeni
- White Sea–Baltic Canal
- Unified Deep Water System of European Russia
