= Unified Deep Water System of European Russia =

System of inland waterways in Russia

A map showing the network of waterways

The Unified Deep Water System of European Russia (Russian: Единая глубоководная система Европейской части Российской Федерации, romanized: Yedinaya glubokovodnaya sistema Yevropeyskoy chasti Rossiyskoy Federatsii) or UDWS (Russian: ЕГС) is a system of inland waterways in Russia linking the White Sea, the Baltic Sea, the Volga River, Moscow, the Caspian Sea and—via the Sea of Azov—the Black Sea. In 2010, UDWS carried 70 million tons of cargo and 12 million passengers, making up two-thirds of overall inland waterway traffic volume in Russia. There are 60 common-use ports and quays in the UDWS, including three international ports (two in Moscow and one in Dmitrov, Moscow Oblast), so Moscow is sometimes called "the port of the five seas".

The depth is mostly guaranteed at only 4 metres (13 ft) and some sections are even shallower, such as Gorodets–Nizhny Novgorod at 2.5 metres (8.2 ft) and Kochetovsky Bagayevskaya at 3.2 metres (10 ft). There are plans to increase depth of these sections to 4 m.

The system includes these waterways:

- Neva River
- Lake Ladoga
- Svir River
- Lake Onega
- Volga–Baltic Waterway — connects Lake Onega to the Volga River; built in the early 19th century as Mariinsk Canal System and rebuilt in 1956–1964 (ships 210×17.6×4m)
- White Sea–Baltic Canal — connects Lake Onega to the White Sea; constructed in 1931–1933 (ships 135×14.3×3.5 m)
- Moscow Canal — connects Moscow to the Volga River; constructed in 1932–1937 (ships 290×30×5.5m)
- Volga River
- Kama River
- Belaya River
- Volga–Don Canal — connects the Volga River to the Don River; constructed in 1948–1952 (ships 141×16.8×3.6)
- Don River

== Lock dimensions ==
A limiting factor for the size of vessels that can use the waterways are the dimensions of the locks, which vary somewhat throughout the system. In particular, the route from St Petersburg to Rybinsk Dam (via the Volga-Baltic Waterway) accommodates vessels with the length of up to 170 m, the width of up to 16.8 m, and the draught of up to 3.6 m, with the space of at least 14.6 m available under bridges. From the Rybinsk Dam to the mouth of the Volga (Streletskoye), the guaranteed sizes are length 280 m, width 28.50 m, draught 3.10 m, with at least 11.70 m of space available under bridges.

== Environmental impact ==
In 1999, the warty comb jelly colonized the Caspian Sea via the UDWS. The establishment of this population led to a 60% reduction in the number of sprat, which in turn led to a reduction in the population of sturgeon and seals.

In total, according to the unified federal/state agency CaspNIRKh (Russian: КаспНИРХ), about 60 alien species of plants and animals penetrated into the Caspian Sea in the 20th century, which has led to significant changes to ecosystems.

== See also ==
- Baltimax – 15.2m draft, as NeoPanamax 366x49x15.2 loading 14.000 TEU
- Bangkok Port – 8.2m draft; Bangkokmax 1900 TEU
- Chesapeake & Delaware Canal – Draft 10.7m
- Classification of European Inland Waterways – Euroschiff-Johann Welker 80x9.5x2.5m, 90 TEU
- Don–Volga-Portage – Ancient Russian trade and military route
- Eurasia Canal – Proposed 700-kilometre-long canal
- Grand Canal (China) – System of interconnected canals in China
- Inland waterways of the United States
- Panama Canal – Ships 289x32x12m, 4500 TEU
- Paraguay River – Almost 2.5m in middle river, 1.6m in upper river
- Saimaa Canal – Finland, max length 82.5m, beam 12.6m, draft 4.2m
- Seawaymax – United States Great Lakes docks, 8.1m draft
