= Linyovo Ozero =

Rural locality in Khiloksky District, Zabaykalsky Krai, Russia

Coordinates: 51°21′34″N 110°39′00″E

Linyovo Ozero (Russian: Линёво озеро) is a village (selo) in the central part of Khiloksky District of Zabaykalsky Krai, Russia, located on the Bludnaya River. Population: 2,655 (2002).

It was founded in 1927 as a logging post for railway network's needs and in the course of decades it has become a highly developed logging industry center.
