= Avilovsky =

Avilovsky Авиловский
- Settlement
- Location within Volgograd Oblast Location within Russia
- Coordinates: 50°10′N 45°08′E
- Country: Russia
- Region: Volgograd Oblast
- District: Kamyshinsky District
- Time zone: UTC+4:00

Avilovsky (Russian: Авиловский) is a rural locality (a settlement) in Petrov Val, Kamyshinsky District, Volgograd Oblast, Russia. The population was 2 as of 2010.

== Geography ==
The village is located on the Volga Upland, on the left bank of the Mokraya Olkhovka River, 29 km from Kamyshin, 13 km from Petrov Val and 200 km from Volgograd.
