= Linyovo, Volgograd Oblast =

Linyovo Линёво
- Urban-type settlement
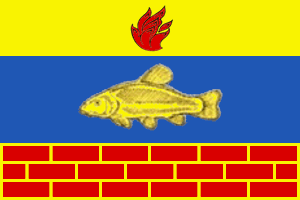
- Flag
- Interactive map of Linyovo
- Location of Linyovo Linyovo (Volgograd Oblast)
- Coordinates: 50.8828°N 44.8234°E
- Country: Russia
- Federal subject: Volgograd Oblast
- Administrative district: Zhirnovsky District
- Founded: 1764

Population (2010 Census)
  - Total: 6,037
  - Estimate (2021): 5,421 (−10.2%)
- Time zone: UTC+3 (MSK)
- Postal code: 403770
- OKTMO ID: 18612162051

Linyovo (Russian: Линёво) is an urban locality (an urban-type settlement) in Zhirnovsky District of Volgograd Oblast, Russia. Population: 6,037 (2010 census); 6,697 (2002 census); 6,773 (1989 Soviet census).
