= Sebrovo =

Sebrovo Себрово
- Urban-type settlement
- Interactive map of Sebrovo
- Location of Sebrovo Sebrovo (Volgograd Oblast)
- Coordinates: 50.0991°N 43.2994°E
- Country: Russia
- Federal subject: Volgograd Oblast
- Founded: 1762

Population (2010 Census)
  - Total: 4,935
  - Estimate (2021): 4,820 (−2.3%)
- Time zone: UTC+3 (MSK)
- Postal code: 403310
- OKTMO ID: 18720000056

Sebrovo (Russian: Себрово) is an urban locality (an urban-type settlement) in Volgograd Oblast, Russia. Population: 4,935 (2010 census); 4,486 (2002 census); 5,114 (1989 Soviet census).
