= Don–Volga portage =

Ancient Russian trade and military route

Don–Volga Portage (Russian: Волгодонская переволока, Volgodonskaya Perevoloka) refers to the ancient trade and military route located on the shortest distance (ca. 70 kilometers) between the major rivers Volga and Don, in today's Volgograd Oblast. The portage, where cargo and ships would be drawn over land either manually or by horse-drawn vehicles, was in use from the 1st millennium BCE to 1952 CE, when the Volga–Don Canal was opened.

== Maps ==
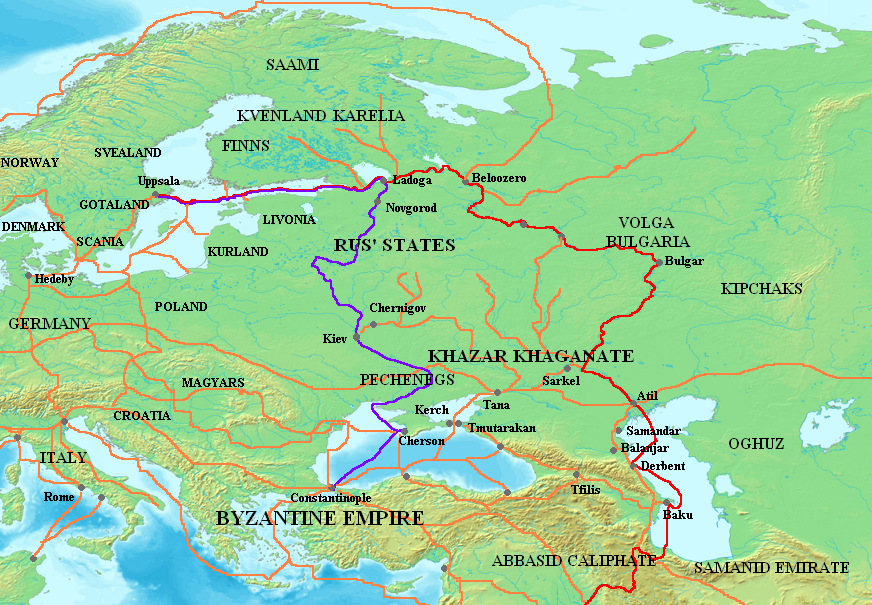
Trade routes between the 8th and 11th centuries AD, with the Don Portage controlled by the Khazar fortress Sarkel.

Volgodonskaya Perevoloka on the map (1562).

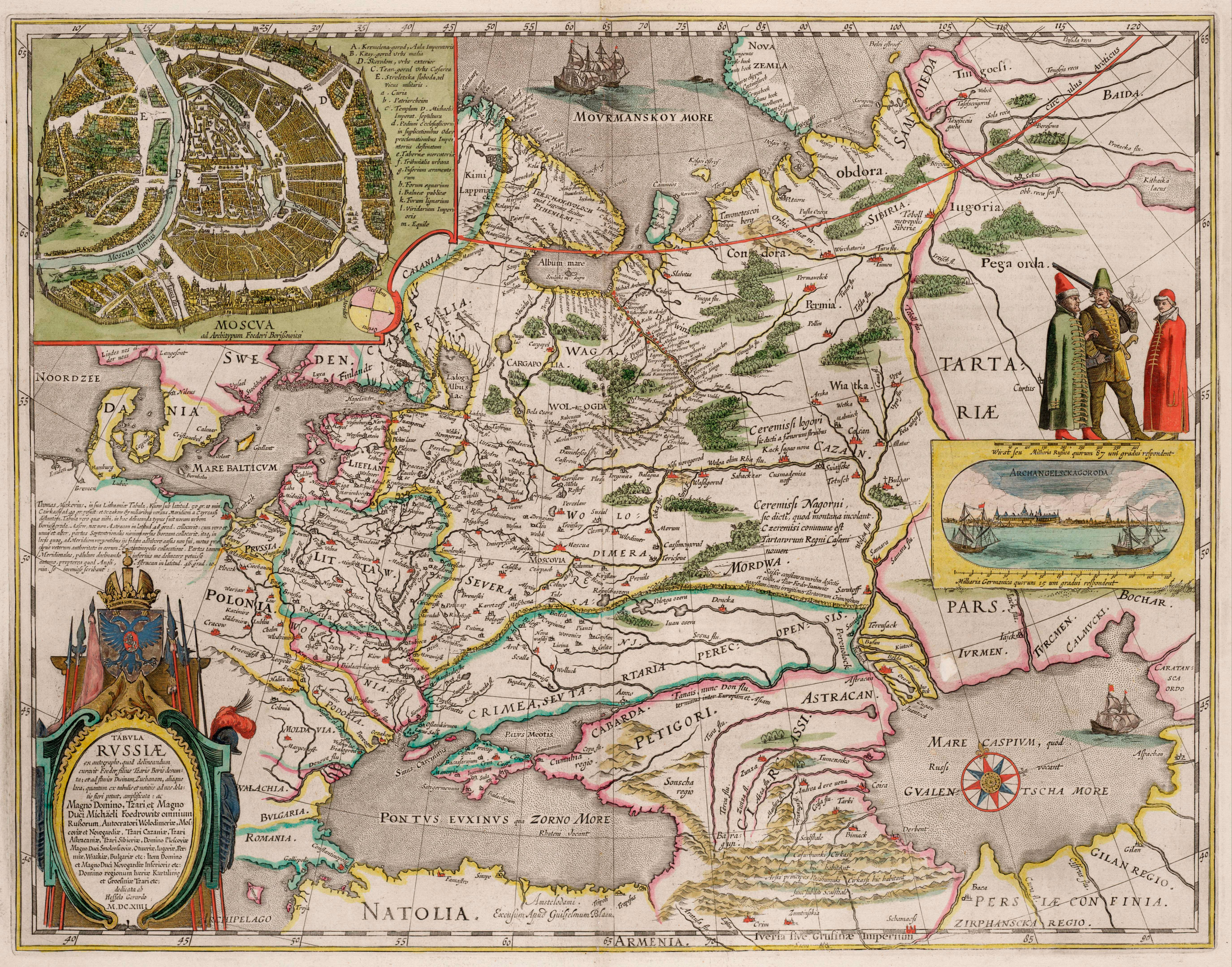
Volgodonskaya Perevoloka on the map (1614).

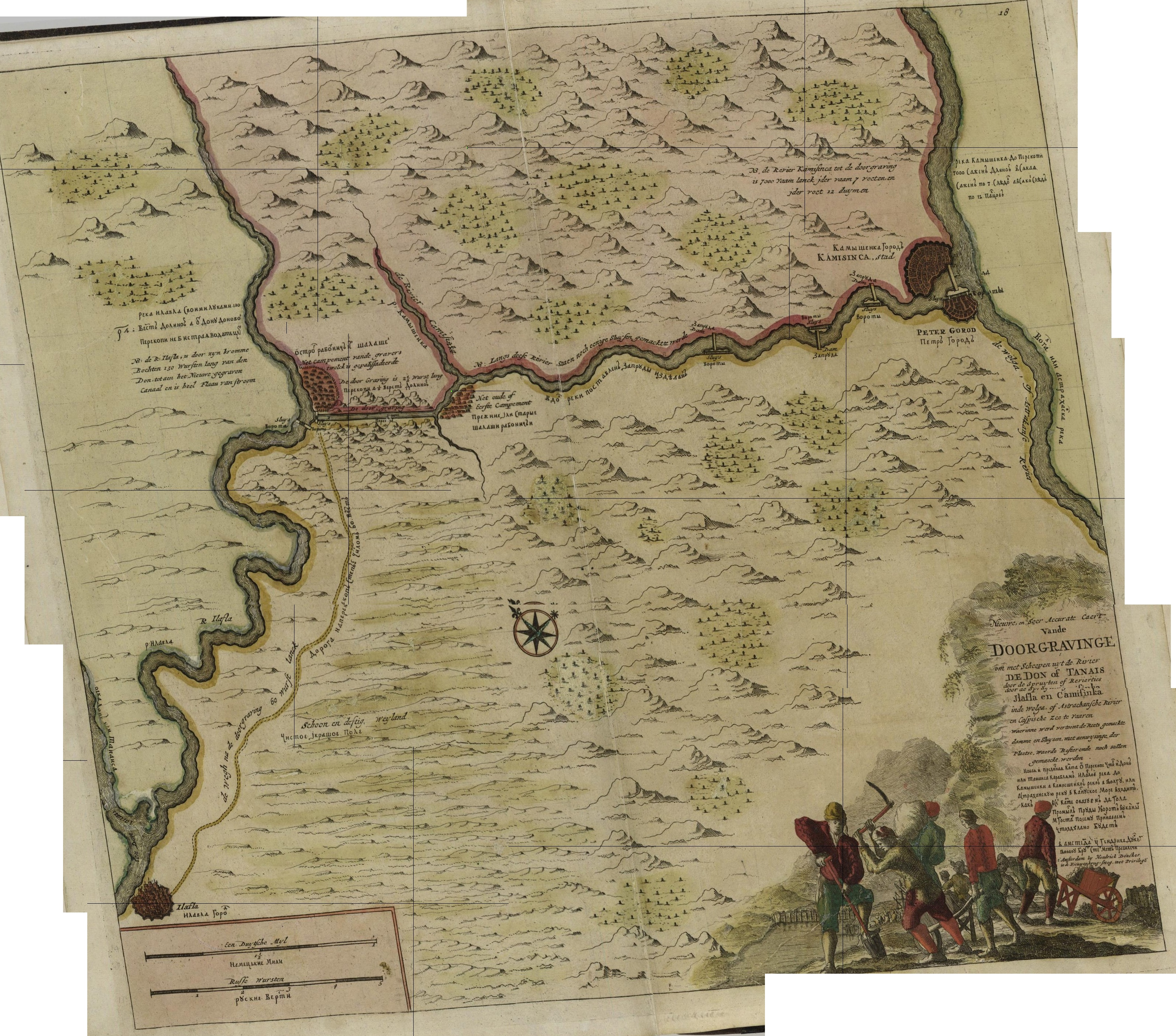
Channel construction plan (1704).

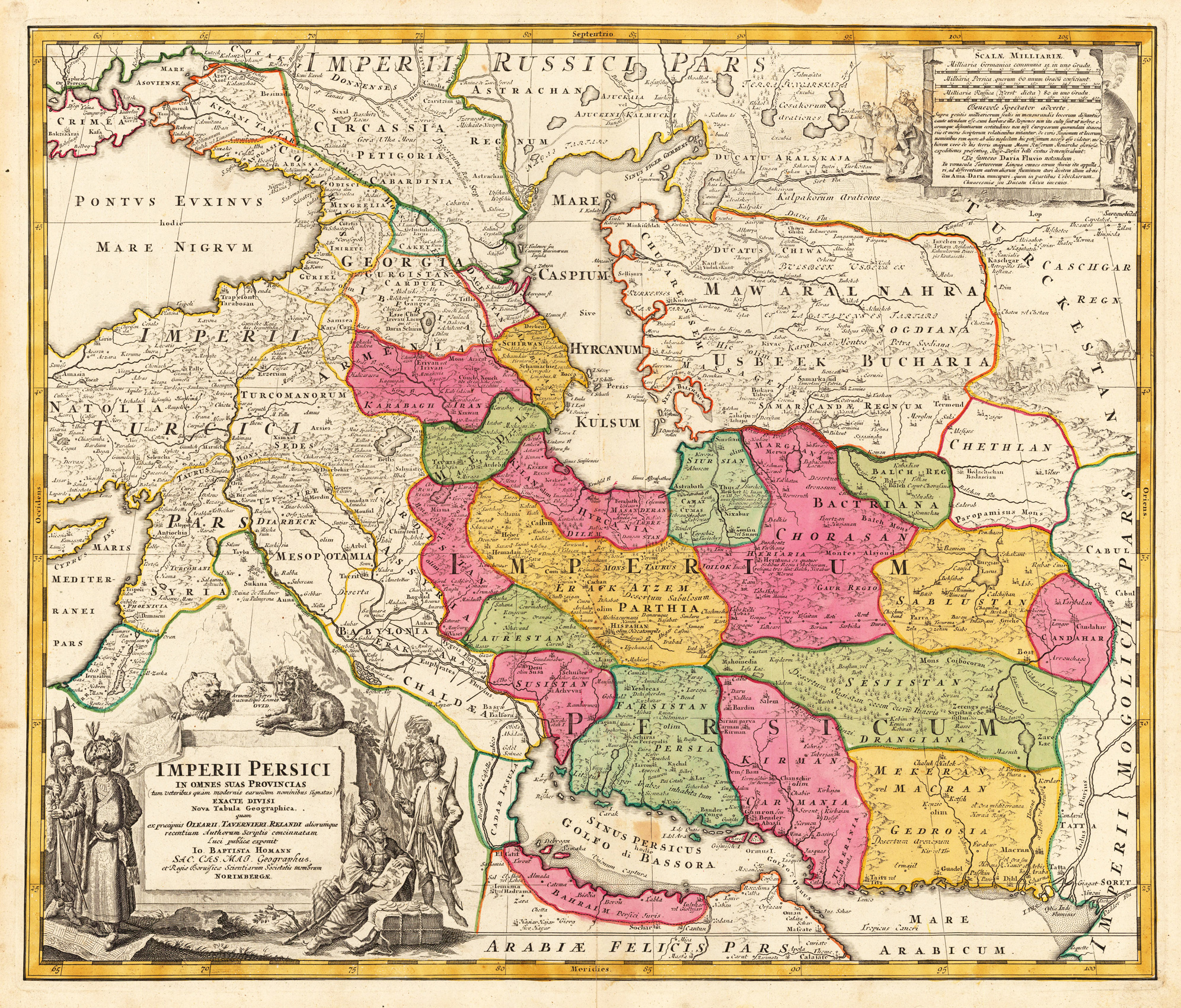
Volgodonskaya Perevoloka (designated channel) on the map of Persia (1720s).

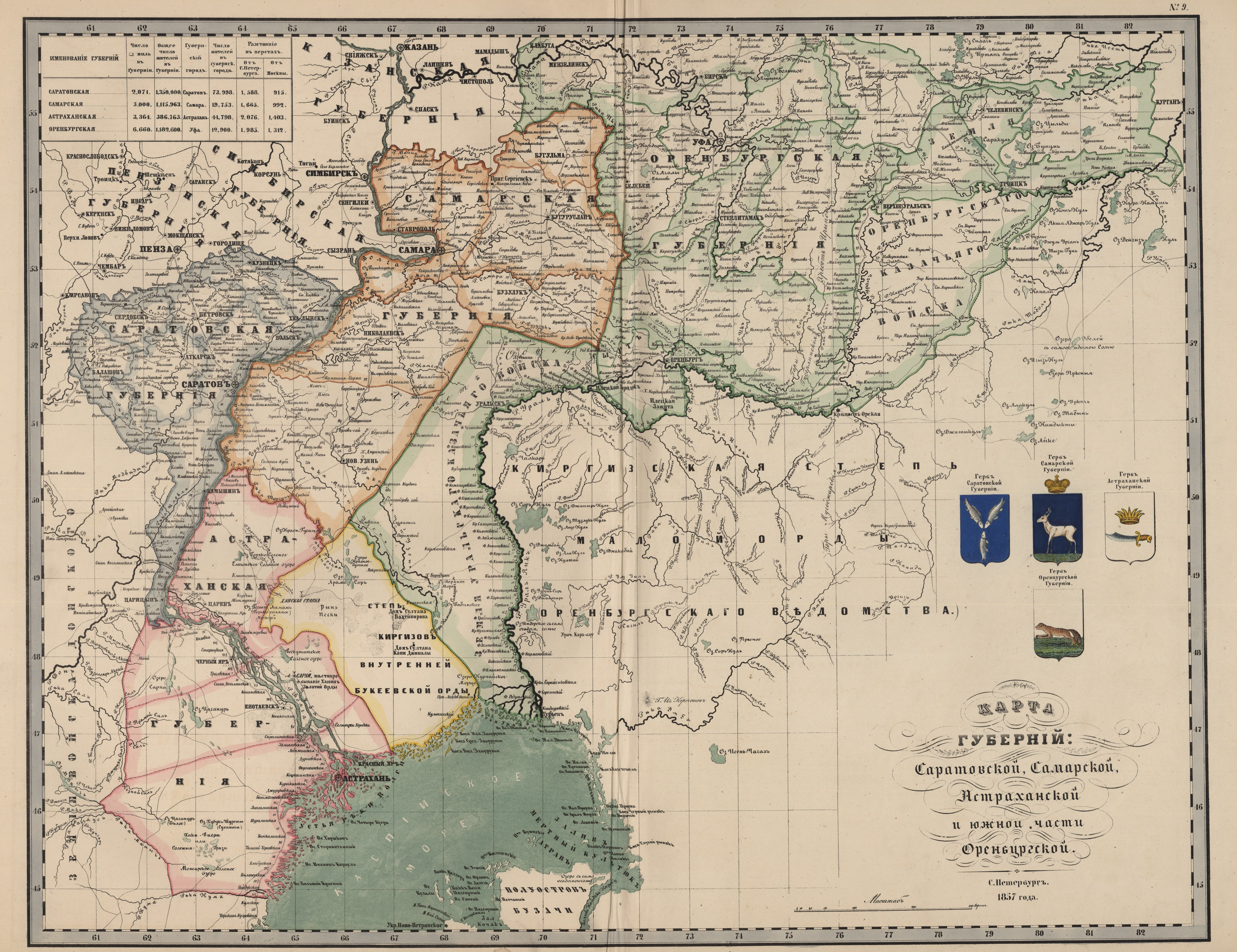
Dubovskoy-Kachalin horse-drawn railway on the map (1857).

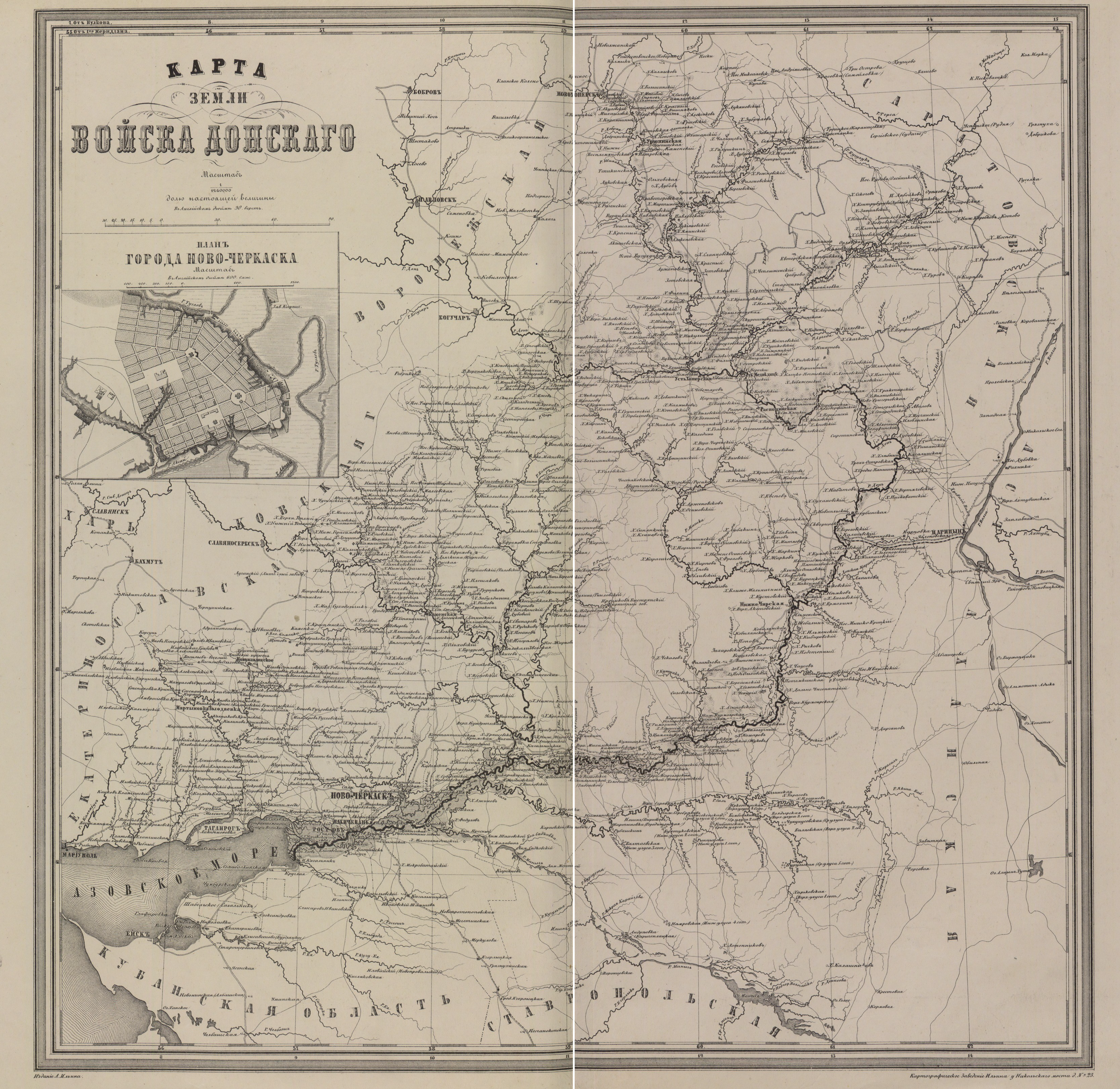
Volga-Don railway station on the map of the Don Cossacks (1871).

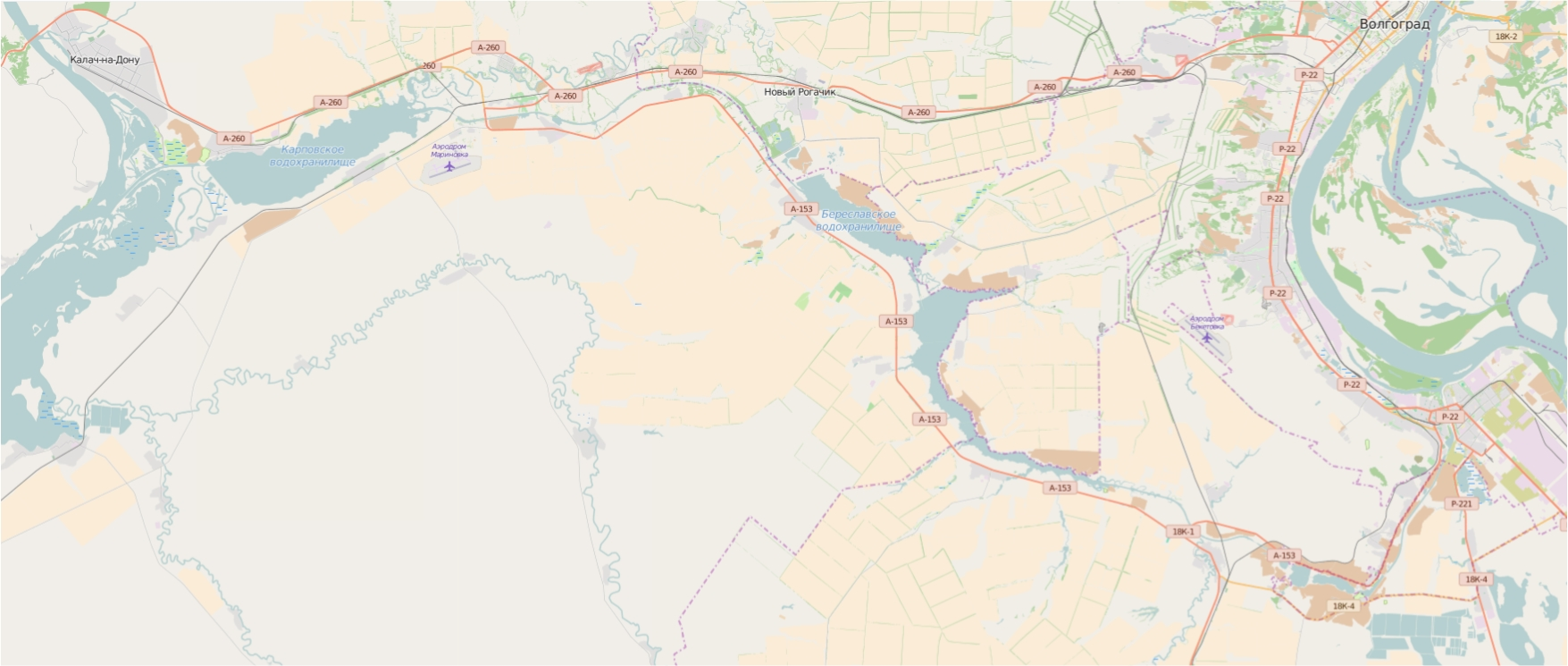
Volga–Don Canal (2016).

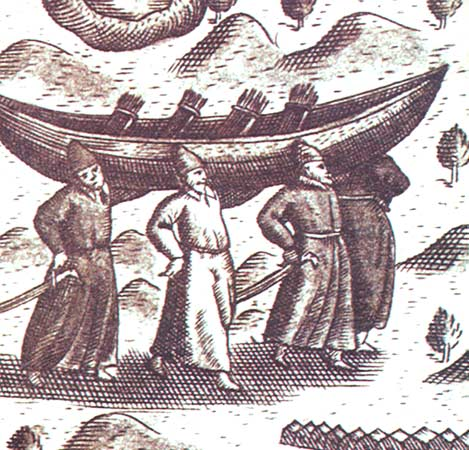
Russian fishermen carrying a strug boat, 16th century.
