= Zhirnovsk =

Town in Volgograd Oblast, Russia

Zhirnovsk Жирновск
- Town
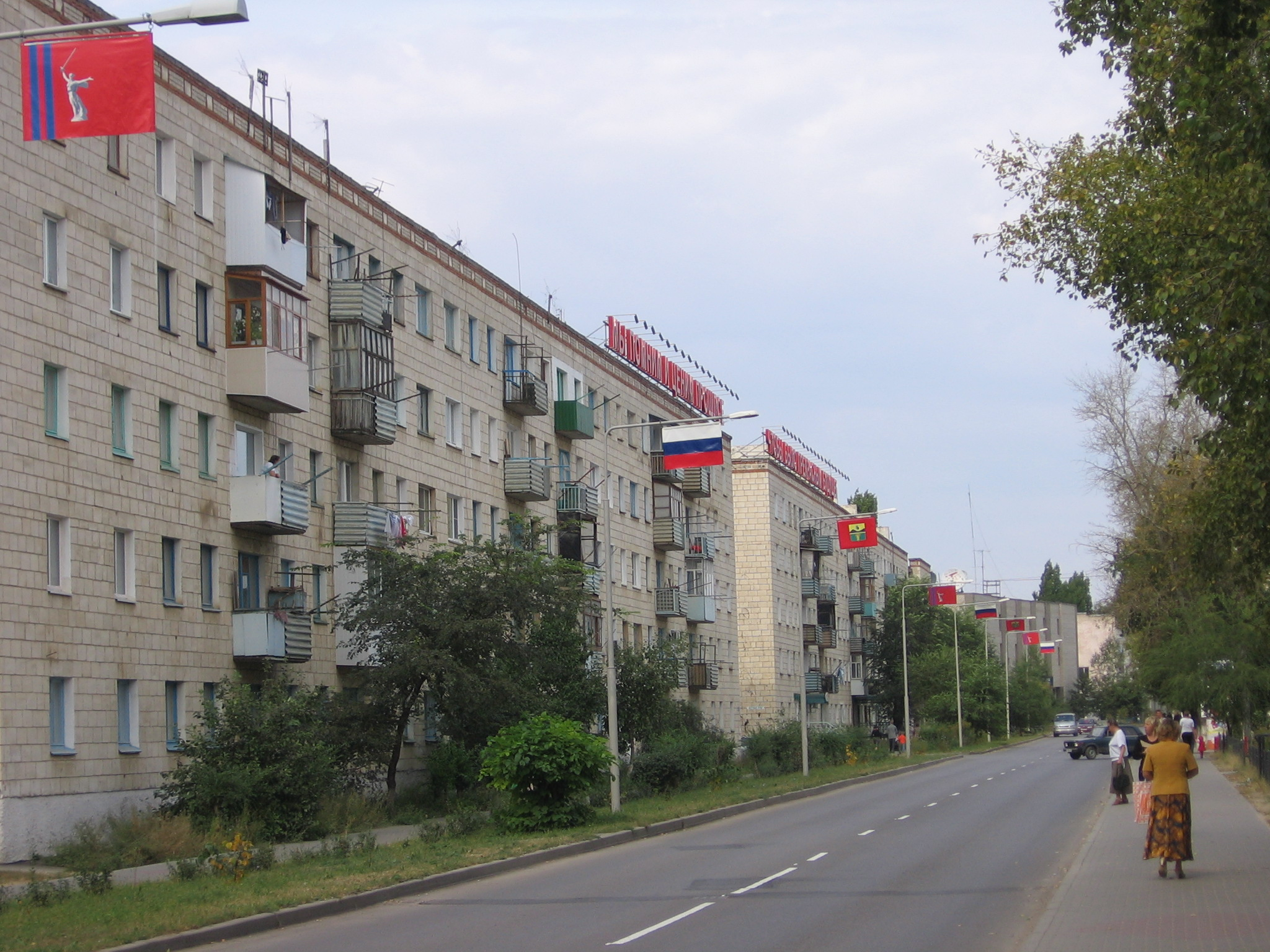
- Lomonosova Street in central Zhirnovsk

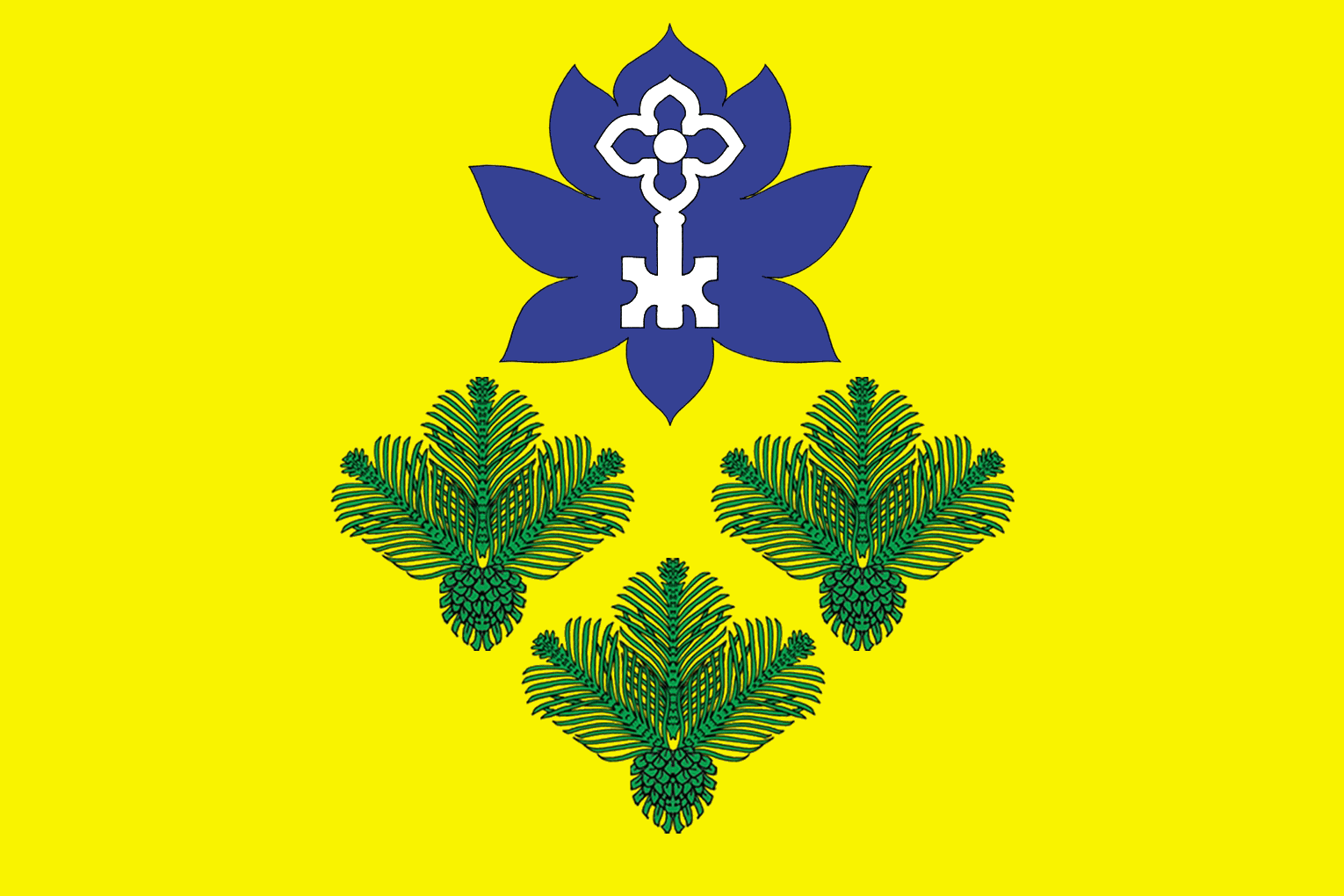
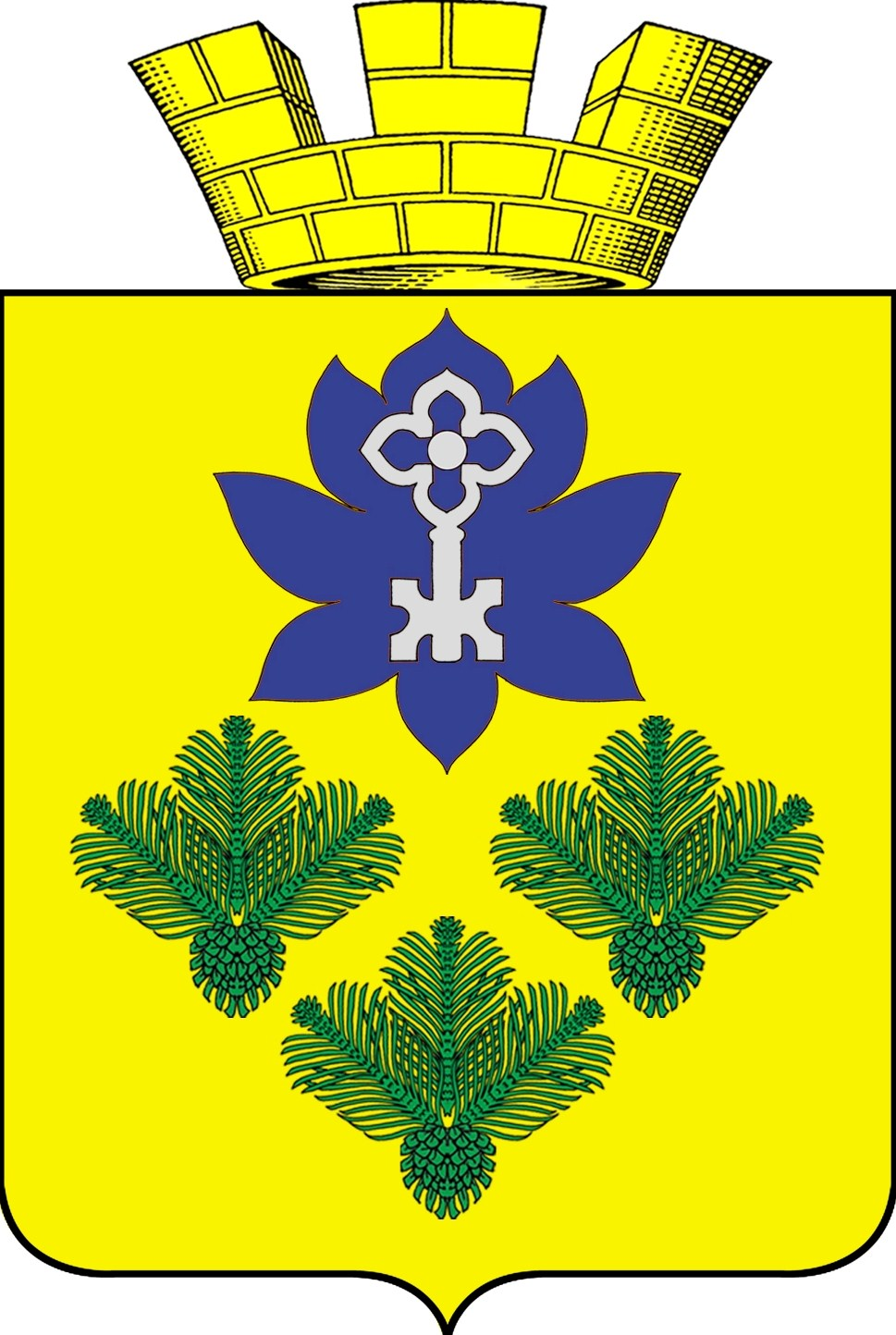
- Flag Coat of arms
- Interactive map of Zhirnovsk
- Location of Zhirnovsk Zhirnovsk (Volgograd Oblast)
- Coordinates: 50°59′N 44°47′E
- Country: Russia
- Federal subject: Volgograd Oblast
- Administrative district: Zhirnovsky District
- Town of district significanceSelsoviet: Zhirnovsk
- Founded: 1958
- Elevation: 120 m (390 ft)

Population (2010 Census)
  - Total: 16,872
  - Estimate (2025): 15,003 (−11.1%)

Administrative status
  - Capital of: Zhirnovsky District, town of district significance of Zhirnovsk

Municipal status
  - Municipal district: Zhirnovsky Municipal District
  - Urban settlement: Zhirnovskoye Urban Settlement
  - Capital of: Zhirnovsky Municipal District, Zhirnovskoye Urban Settlement
- Time zone: UTC+3 (MSK)
- Postal code: 403790–403793
- Dialing code: +7 84454
- OKTMO ID: 18612101001
- Website: www.jirnovsk.ru

Zhirnovsk (Russian: Жи́рновск) is a town and the administrative center of Zhirnovsky District in Volgograd Oblast, Russia, located on the left bank of the Medveditsa River, which itself flows into the Don. Zhirnovsk lies 320 kilometers (200 mi) north of Volgograd, the administrative center of the oblast. Population: 16,872 (2010 census); 17,751 (2002 census); 16,792 (1989 Soviet census).

== History ==
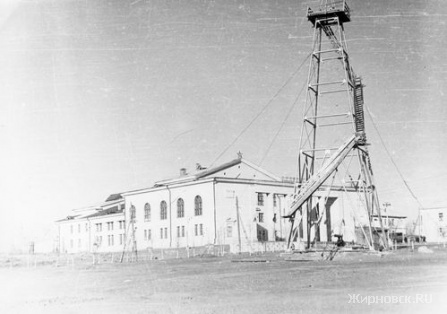
Zhirnovsk central square in old times

It was founded in 1958 by merging the villages of Zhirnoye Selo (Жи́рное Село́) and Kurakino Selo (Куракино Село́), each of which had been founded in their own right in the 17th and 18th centuries. The merger was prompted by the discovery of significant oil deposits near these villages in the 1940s and the consequent establishment of a worker's housing estate in 1954.

== Administrative and municipal status ==
Within the framework of administrative divisions, Zhirnovsk serves as the administrative center of Zhirnovsky District. As an administrative division, it is incorporated within Zhirnovsky District as the town of district significance of Zhirnovsk. As a municipal division, the town of district significance of Zhirnovsk is incorporated within Zhirnovsky Municipal District as Zhirnovskoye Urban Settlement.

== Economy ==
As of 2010, oil and gas processing remains the towns chief industry.
