= Zhirnovsky District =

Zhirnovsky District Жирновский район (Russian)
- District
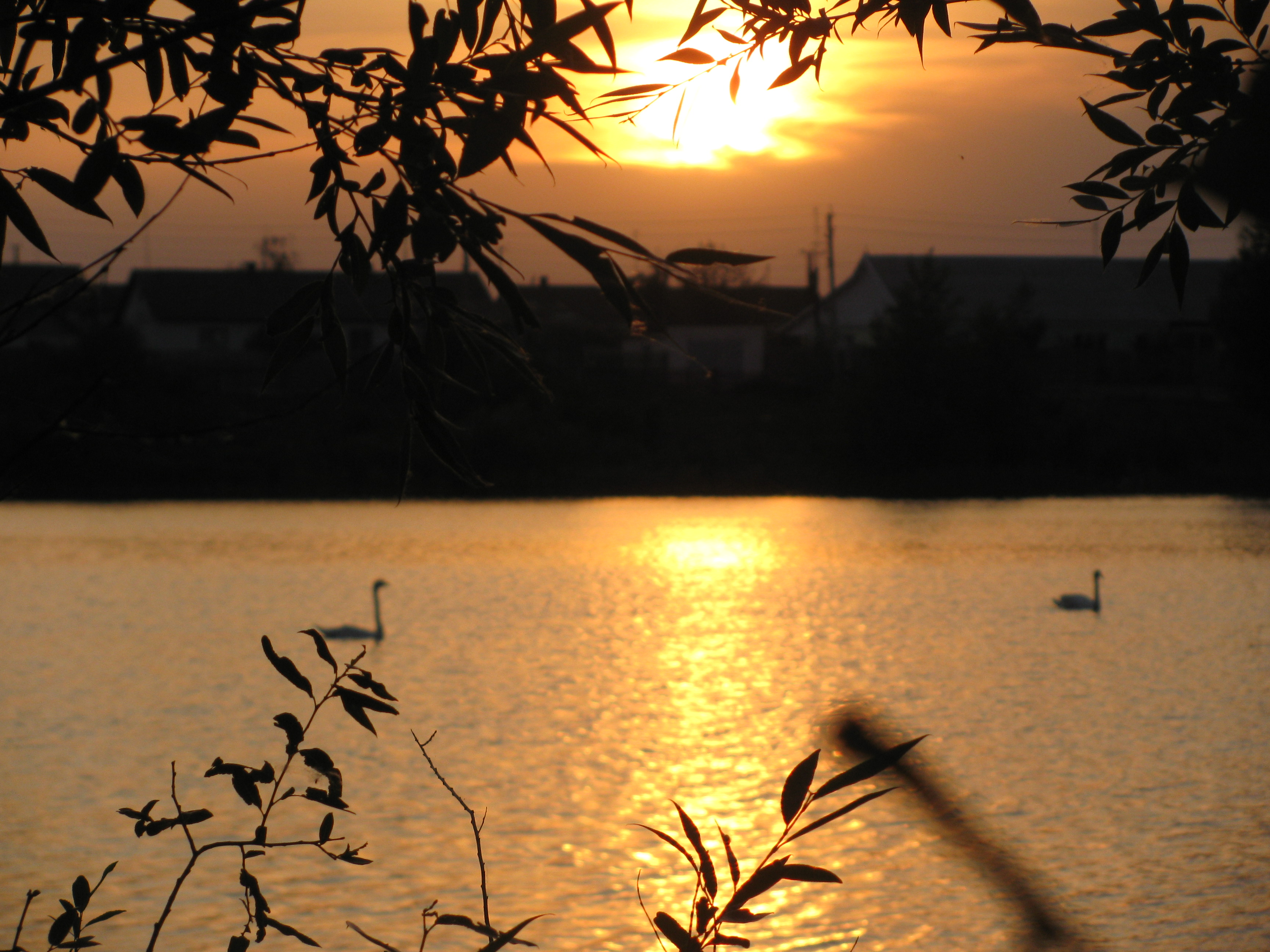
- Lake Liman in Zhirnovsky District

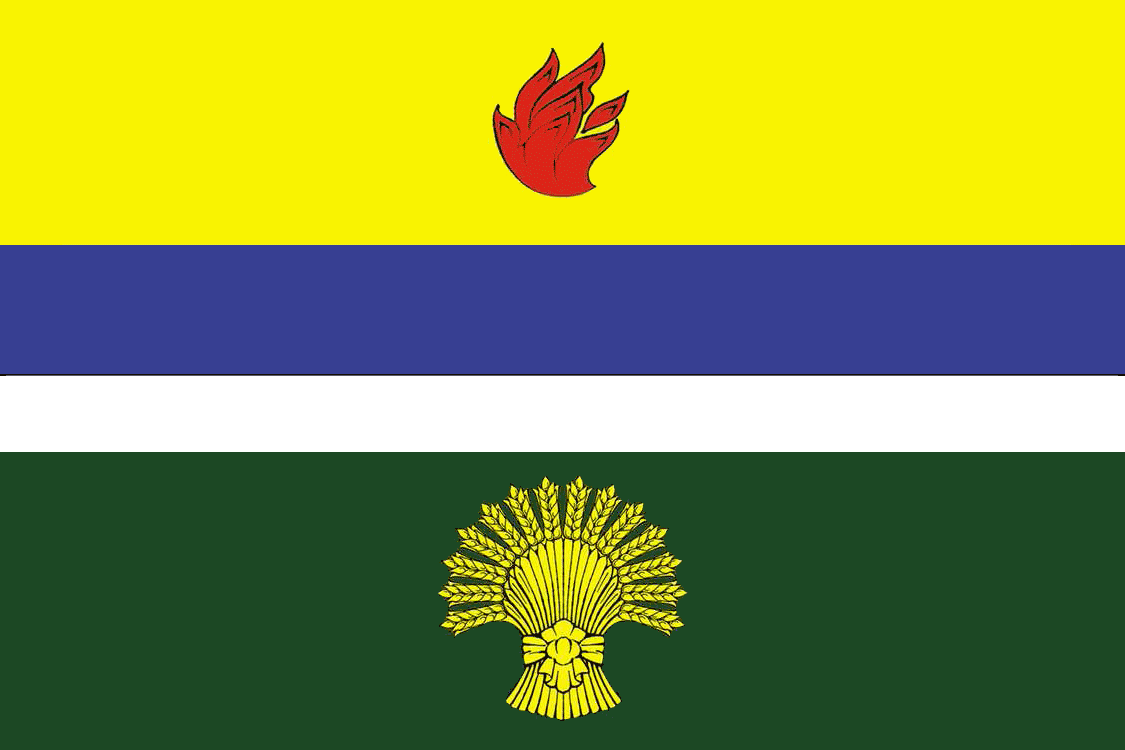
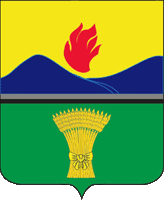
- Flag Coat of arms
- Location of Zhirnovsky District in Volgograd Oblast
- Coordinates: 50°59′N 44°46′E
- Country: Russia
- Federal subject: Volgograd Oblast
- Established: April 1942
- Administrative center: Zhirnovsk

Area
  - Total: 2,970 km^{2} (1,150 sq mi)

Population (2010 Census)
  - Total: 43,685
  - Density: 14.7/km^{2} (38.1/sq mi)
  - Urban: 71.4%
  - Rural: 28.6%

Administrative structure
  - Administrative divisions: 1 Towns of district significance, 3 Urban-type settlements, 11 Selsoviets
  - Inhabited localities: 1 cities/towns, 3 urban-type settlements, 32 rural localities

Municipal structure
  - Municipally incorporated as: Zhirnovsky Municipal District
  - Municipal divisions: 4 urban settlements, 11 rural settlements
- Time zone: UTC+3 (MSK)
- OKTMO ID: 18612000
- Website: http://www.admzhirn.ru/

Zhirnovsky District (Russian: Жи́рновский райо́н) is an administrative district (raion), one of the thirty-three in Volgograd Oblast, Russia. As a municipal division, it is incorporated as Zhirnovsky Municipal District. It is located in the north of the oblast. The area of the district is 2,970 square kilometers (1,150 sq mi). Its administrative center is the town of Zhirnovsk. Population: 43,685 (2010 census); 47,575 (2002 Census); 46,418 (1989 Soviet census). The population of Zhirnovsk accounts for 38.6% of the district's total population.
