= Dubovka =

Dubovka (Russian: Дубовка) is the name of several inhabited localities in Russia.

Urban localities

- Dubovka, Dubovsky District, Volgograd Oblast, a town in Dubovsky District of Volgograd Oblast; administratively incorporated as a town of district significance

Rural localities

- Dubovka, Republic of Bashkortostan, a village in Nizhnebaltachevsky Selsoviet of Tatyshlinsky District of the Republic of Bashkortostan
- Dubovka, Komsomolsky District, Chuvash Republic, a village in Komsomolskoye Rural Settlement of Komsomolsky District of the Chuvash Republic
- Dubovka, Krasnoarmeysky District, Chuvash Republic, a village in Isakovskoye Rural Settlement of Krasnoarmeysky District of the Chuvash Republic
- Dubovka, Krasnochetaysky District, Chuvash Republic, a village in Krasnochetayskoye Rural Settlement of Krasnochetaysky District of the Chuvash Republic
- Dubovka, Mariinsko-Posadsky District, Chuvash Republic, a village in Privolzhskoye Rural Settlement of Mariinsko-Posadsky District of the Chuvash Republic
- Dubovka, Shumerlinsky District, Chuvash Republic, a settlement in Bolshealgashinskoye Rural Settlement of Shumerlinsky District of the Chuvash Republic
- Dubovka, Moscow Oblast, a village in Klenovskoye Rural Settlement of Podolsky District of Moscow Oblast
- Dubovka, Ardatovsky District, Nizhny Novgorod Oblast, a selo in Zhureleysky Selsoviet of Ardatovsky District of Nizhny Novgorod Oblast
- Dubovka, Voskresensky District, Nizhny Novgorod Oblast, a village in Yegorovsky Selsoviet of Voskresensky District of Nizhny Novgorod Oblast
- Dubovka, Rostov Oblast, a selo in Yulovskoye Rural Settlement of Tselinsky District of Rostov Oblast
- Dubovka, Ryazan Oblast, a village in Boretsky Rural Okrug of Sarayevsky District of Ryazan Oblast
- Dubovka, Samara Oblast, a settlement in Krasnoarmeysky District of Samara Oblast
- Dubovka, Saratov Oblast, a selo in Krasnoarmeysky District of Saratov Oblast
- Dubovka, Stavropol Krai, a selo in Dubovsky Selsoviet of Shpakovsky District of Stavropol Krai
- Dubovka, Republic of Tatarstan, a village in Bavlinsky District of the Republic of Tatarstan
- Dubovka, Bogoroditsky District, Tula Oblast, a village in Novopokrovsky Rural Okrug of Bogoroditsky District of Tula Oblast
- Dubovka, Bolshekalmyksky Rural Okrug, Kireyevsky District, Tula Oblast, a village in Bolshekalmyksky Rural Okrug of Kireyevsky District of Tula Oblast
- Dubovka, Shvartsevsky, Kireyevsky District, Tula Oblast, a village under the administrative jurisdiction of the urban-type settlement of Shvartsevsky in Kireyevsky District of Tula Oblast
- Dubovka (village), Uzlovsky District, Tula Oblast, a village in Akimo-Ilyinskaya Rural Administration of Uzlovsky District of Tula Oblast
- Dubovka (settlement), Uzlovsky District, Tula Oblast, a settlement in Akimo-Ilyinskaya Rural Administration of Uzlovsky District of Tula Oblast
- Dubovka, Kamyshinsky District, Volgograd Oblast, a khutor in Ternovsky Selsoviet of Kamyshinsky District in Volgograd Oblast
- Dubovka, Vologda Oblast, a village in Yurovsky Selsoviet of Gryazovetsky District of Vologda Oblast

Abolished rural localities

- Dubovka, Omsk Oblast, a village in Martyushevsky Rural Okrug of Tarsky District of Omsk Oblast; abolished in November 2008
