= Volzhsky constituency =

Legislative constituency in Russia

Volzhsky single-member constituency
- Constituency of the Russian State Duma
- Deputy: Vitaly Likhachyov; United Russia
- Federal subject: Volgograd Oblast
- Districts: Bykovsky, Leninsky, Nikolayevsky, Pallasovsky, Sredneakhtubinsky, Staropoltavsky, Volgograd (Krasnooktyabrsky, Traktorozavodsky), Volzhsky
- Voters: 552,408 (2026)

The Volzhsky constituency (No.87 (Note: No.68 in 1993-1995, No.67 in 1995-2003, No.69 in 2003-2007, No.84 in 2016–2026)) is a Russian legislative constituency in Volgograd Oblast. It covers eastern Volgograd Oblast, northern Volgograd and its satellite city Volzhsky.

The constituency has been represented since 2026 by United Russia deputy Vitaly Likhachyov, two-term State Duma member and former Volgograd mayor, who won the open seat left vacant following the resignation of four-term United Russia deputy Oleg Savchenko.

== Boundaries ==
1993–2007: Bykovsky District, Dubovsky District, Kamyshin, Kamyshinsky District, Leninsky District, Nikolayevsky District, Pallasovsky District, Sredneakhtubinsky District, Staropoltavsky District, Volzhsky
The constituency covered eastern and north-eastern Volgograd Oblast, including the towns of Kamyshin and Volzhsky.

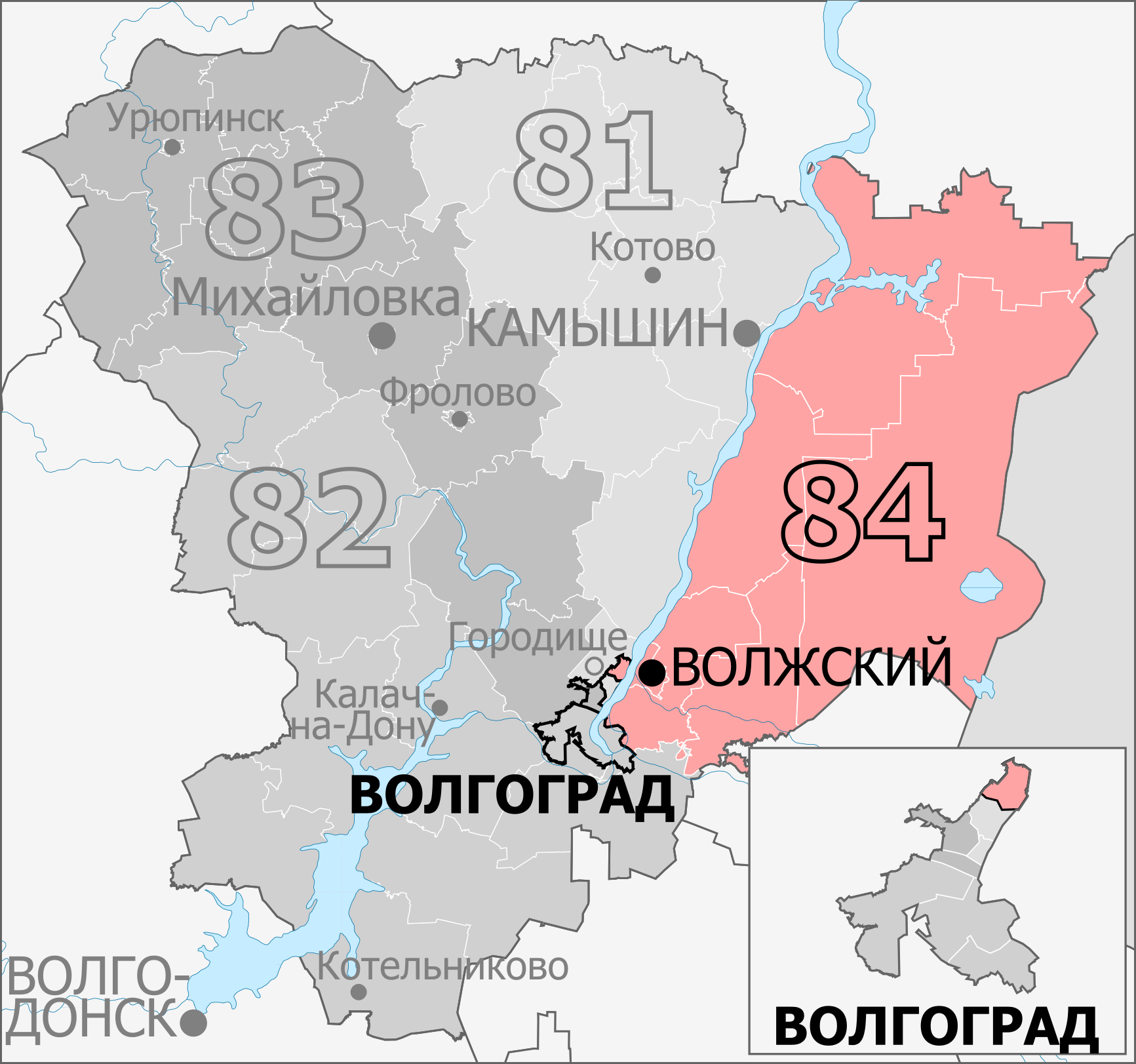
Constituency boundaries from 2016 to 2026

2016–2026: Bykovsky District, Leninsky District, Nikolayevsky District, Pallasovsky District, Sredneakhtubinsky District, Staropoltavsky District, Volgograd (Traktorozavodsky), Volzhsky
The constituency was re-created for the 2016 election. It retained its position in eastern Volgograd Oblast, losing Dubovsky District, Kamyshin and Kamyshinsky District to Krasnoarmeysky constituency, in return, gaining Traktorozavodsky District of Volgograd from the former Central constituency.

2026–present: Bykovsky District, Leninsky District, Nikolayevsky District, Pallasovsky District, Sredneakhtubinsky District, Staropoltavsky District, Volgograd (Krasnooktyabrsky, Traktorozavodsky), Volzhsky
After the 2025 redistricting Volgograd Oblast lost one of its four constituencies, so all remaining seats saw some changes. The constituency retained all of its territory and gained Krasnooktyabrsky city district of Volgograd from the former Volgograd constituency.

== Members elected ==
Election	Member	Party
1993	Valery Nikitin	Independent
1995	Aleksandr Kulikov	Communist Party
1999	Aleksandr Kulikov	Communist Party
2003	Aleksandr Ageyev	United Russia
2007	Proportional representation - no election by constituency	
2011	Proportional representation - no election by constituency	
2016	Irina Guseva	United Russia
2021	Oleg Savchenko (Note: resigned in May 2025)	United Russia
2026	Vitaly Likhachyov	United Russia

== Election results ==
=== 1993 ===
Summary of the 12 December 1993 Russian legislative election in the Volzhsky constituency
Candidate	Party	Votes	%
Valery Nikitin	Independent	57,422	21.71%
Tatyana Kandaurova	Independent	33,244	12.57%
Aleksandr Kulikov	Independent	28,908	10.93%
Vladimir Bryukov	Democratic Party	21,158	8.00%
Yevgeny Novikov	Agrarian Party	20,720	7.83%
Valentin Korinets	Independent	16,821	6.36%
Aleksandr Makhmutov	Party of Russian Unity and Accord	9,983	3.77%
Valeria Kotovets	Independent	9,307	3.52%
Nikolay Solovyov	Independent	8,369	3.16%
Andrey Tatarinov	Russian Democratic Reform Movement	7,127	2.69%
Igor Permyakov	Independent	3,804	1.44%
Nikolay Numerov	Civic Union	2,854	1.08%
against all		29,874	11.29%
Total		264,540	100%

=== 1995 ===
Summary of the 17 December 1995 Russian legislative election in the Volzhsky constituency
Candidate	Party	Votes	%
Aleksandr Kulikov	Communist Party	104,821	31.03%
Aleksandr Sharonov	Independent	28,525	8.45%
Vyacheslav Molchanov	Independent	27,951	8.28%
Vladimir Mironenko	Yabloko	27,450	8.13%
Vladimir Kontemirov	Independent	25,397	7.52%
Tatyana Kandaurova	Women of Russia	22,128	6.55%
Mikhail Kulapov	Party of Russian Unity and Accord	18,365	5.44%
Igor Bugayenko	Party of Workers' Self-Government	17,039	5.04%
Vladimir Tuayev	Independent	13,043	3.86%
Aleksandr Sherstyuk	Congress of Russian Communities	8,485	2.51%
Roman Rastegayev	Independent	6,807	2.02%
Valentin Korinets	Forward, Russia!	5,378	1.59%
Sergey Dubinin	Party of Economic Freedom	2,909	0.86%
Nikolay Smirnov	Independent	2,829	0.84%
against all		20,397	6.04%
Total		337,757	100%

=== 1999 ===
Summary of the 19 December 1999 Russian legislative election in the Volzhsky constituency
Candidate	Party	Votes	%
Aleksandr Kulikov (incumbent)	Communist Party	125,067	40.96%
Lev Kirichenko	Independent	71,554	23.43%
Lidia Budchenko	Women of Russia	31,541	10.33%
Pavel Kazachenok	Independent	14,798	4.85%
Andrey Yeremin	Independent	9,308	3.05%
Anatoly Popov	Independent	0	0.00%
against all		44,226	14.48%
Total		305,341	100%

=== 2003 ===
Summary of the 7 December 2003 Russian legislative election in the Volzhsky constituency
Candidate	Party	Votes	%
Aleksandr Ageyev	United Russia	92,355	34.16%
Aleksandr Kulikov (incumbent)	Communist Party	88,587	32.77%
Aleksandr Tavaldyev	Independent	14,186	5.25%
Vladislav Popov	Independent	13,351	4.94%
Anatoly Shiryayev	Independent	8,086	2.99%
Tazhib Tazhibov	Great Russia – Eurasian Union	1,721	0.64%
against all		45,086	16.68%
Total		270,443	100%

=== 2016 ===
Summary of the 18 September 2016 Russian legislative election in the Volzhsky constituency
Candidate	Party	Votes	%
Irina Guseva	United Russia	96,094	48.58%
Dmitry Litvintsev	Liberal Democratic Party	32,426	16.39%
Aleksandr Kobelev	Communist Party	22,942	11.60%
Yekaterina Surova	A Just Russia	13,295	6.72%
Nonna Tskayeva	Communists of Russia	6,036	3.05%
Aleksandr Yefimov	Yabloko	5,972	3.02%
Dmitry Getmanenko	Patriots of Russia	4,073	2.06%
Aleksey Sveshnikov	Party of Growth	3,306	1.67%
Yury Dubovoy	The Greens	3,121	1.58%
Igor Konotopov	People's Freedom Party	2,544	1.29%
Total		197,803	100%

=== 2021 ===
Summary of the 17-19 September 2021 Russian legislative election in the Volzhsky constituency
Candidate	Party	Votes	%
Oleg Savchenko	United Russia	135,124	51.55%
Denis Uskov	Communist Party	46,903	17.89%
Aleksandr Anokhin	Liberal Democratic Party	25,571	9.76%
Aleksey Vasyutenko	A Just Russia — For Truth	18,661	7.12%
Dmitry Zaporozhsky	New People	9,947	3.79%
Anton Kalyuzhny	Party of Pensioners	9,464	3.61%
Andrey Yuzhmin	Rodina	4,541	1.73%
Anton Getmanenko	Yabloko	2,939	1.12%
Leonid Semergey	Party of Growth	2,598	0.99%
Total		262,111	100%

=== 2026 ===
Summary of the 18-20 September 2026 Russian legislative election in the Volzhsky constituency
Candidate	Party	Votes	%
Vitaly Likhachyov	United Russia	197,714	55.70%
Denis Uskov	Communist Party	56,134	15.81%
Valery Dolgov	Liberal Democratic Party	33,194	9.35%
Vitaly Kravtsov	A Just Russia	25,291	7.12%
Dmitry Ignatov	Party of Pensioners	21,294	6.00%
Roman Litvinov	New People	16,988	4.79%
Total		354,964	100%
