= Denis Zubov =

Convicted Russian serial killer (1981–2023)

- Born: Denis Alexandrovich Zubov; 1981; Volgograd, Volgograd Oblast, RSFSR
- Died: 20 April 2023 (aged 41–42); Bakhmut, Ukraine
- Conviction: Murder x3
- Penalty: 21 years imprisonment

Details
- Victims: 3
- Span of crimes: 2013–2014
- Country: Russia
- State: Volgograd
- Date apprehended: 2016

Denis Alexandrovich Zubov (Russian: Денис Александрович Зубов; 1981 – 20 April 2023) was a Russian serial killer who killed three people in Volgograd Oblast between 2013 and 2014, cutting off reproductive organs post-mortem in order to humiliate his victims. Following a two-year manhunt, Zubov was arrested in 2016, found guilty of all crimes and sentenced to 21 years imprisonment. He was reportedly released from prison in exchange for doing military service during the Russian invasion of Ukraine and was reportedly killed in action during the Battle of Bakhmut in 2023.

== Early life ==
Little is known about Zubov's background. Born in 1981 in Volgograd, he resided in the city's Krasnoarmeysky District prior to moving to the Oktyabrsky District in 2009, where he had found a job as a labourer on a livestock farm. While working there, he became enamoured with a female coworker, falling in love with her sunny disposition and good work ethic, and soon, they became a couple. However, the woman also got along well with other men, and to Zubov's horror, he learned that she was being courted by a 62-year-old man who also worked at the farm. Because of this, the pair began arguing regularly, and eventually broke up, with the woman returning to Volgograd and Zubov leaving the farm for good.

== Murders ==
Angered and heartbroken by the break-up, Zubov frequently hung around his ex-girlfriend's home on Udmurtskaya Street, where she lived with her mother. On 1 September 2013, while doing his usual routine, Zubov came across his love rival, who appeared to be severely intoxicated. Overcome with jealousy, he lured the man into a secluded area, grabbed him by the collar and threw him to the ground, beating and kicking the elderly man, who was unable to defend himself in his drunken state. After calming down a little, Zubov rummaged through his pockets and found a knife, with which he proceeded to stab the victim directly into the heart, killing him instantly. In order to further mock him, Zubov then proceeded to emasculate the body. Feeling unremorseful and confident that the police wouldn't suspect him of the murder, he returned to his apartment to rest.

Two days later, while travelling on a bus, a 70-year-old pensioner sitting across from Zubov attracted his attention. When she got off at the bus stop in Raygorod, Zubov offered to escort her back to her dacha. The woman accepted his proposition, but when they arrived, her companion suddenly turned violent and began beating her. After she fell to the ground, he grabbed a nearby wrench and crashed it into the woman's head, killing her instantly. After killing the occupant, he rummaged through the dacha in search of money and valuables, stealing 1,800 rubles and an expensive wristwatch. He then dragged the body to the bedroom and placed it on the bed, taking out his knife and severing the woman's breasts. He then set the building on fire and quickly fled the area.

By then, rumours of a serial offender began spreading in the area, and so, Zubov decided to lie low for some time. He moved to the Olkhovsky District and found another job at a farm, and rekindled his previous relationship with his first love. However, his overt jealousy frightened the woman, who told him that she would leave him forever. Seemingly, Zubov accepted it and left her, but continued to keep in touch with the woman. On 27 July 2014, he phoned his ex-girlfriend and asked her to meet him at the tower in the village of Zenzevatka. The pair met at the designated place and wandered off into the forest, engrossed in conversation. Soon after, they began arguing again, and in his blind rage, Zubov hit the woman in the face, knocking her to the ground. He then knelt over her and slowly choked her to death. Realizing what he had done, Zubov dug up a hole near the train station and then buried the corpse there, before quickly returning home. However, the woman's relatives had already reported her disappearance by this time, and told authorities that she had arranged a meeting with Zubov at the location. Authorities called him in for questioning, but by that time, Zubov had already fled and gone into hiding in Saratov Oblast.

== Arrest, trial and imprisonment ==
Zubov eluded authorities for two years before he inexplicably decided to return to Volgograd in 2016. Upon his arrival, he was immediately arrested and brought in for questioning, whereupon he broke down and confessed not only to killing his ex-girlfriend but to the other two killings as well. His DNA was sent to testing and was conclusively linked to biomaterial found on the pensioner's body. When asked why he had cut off the genitalia of his initial victims, Zubov claimed that he had done it to "simulate a serial killer's handwriting" and confuse the investigators.

After being found sane by a preliminary psychiatric exam, Zubov was brought to trial, where he recanted his confessions and proclaimed that he was innocent. Despite these claims, the DNA evidence proved otherwise, and he was thus found guilty on all counts by the jury of the Volgograd Regional Court, which sentenced him to 21 years imprisonment in a corrective labour colony, with two years of probation after release.

== Reported pardon and death ==
On 11 January 2024, the Russian media outlet Mediazona reported that Zubov had been killed while fighting in the Russian invasion of Ukraine. It reported that he had been released from prison as part of a mobilization drive spearheaded by the mercenary Wagner Group and was likely killed in action during the Battle of Bakhmut, with his date of death being listed as 20 April 2023. Zubov was also reported to have received a pardon from President Vladimir Putin in exchange for his service.

== See also ==
- List of Russian serial killers
