= Volgograd constituency =

Russian legislative constituency

Volgograd single-member constituency
- Constituency of the Russian State Duma
- Deputy: Nikolay Nikolayev; United Russia
- Federal subject: Volgograd Oblast
- Districts: Danilovsky, Dubovsky, Frolovo, Frolovsky, Gorodishchensky, Ilovlinsky, Kamyshin, Kamyshinsky, Kikvidzensky, Kotovsky, Olkhovsky, Rudnyansky, Volgograd (Dzerzhinsky, Tsentralny, Tsentralny), Yelansky, Zhirnovsky
- Voters: 573,452 (2026)

The Volgograd constituency (No.85 (Note: Central constituency No.72 in 1993-1995, Central constituency No.71 in 1995-2003, Central constituency No.73 in 2003-2007, No.81 in 2016–2026)) is a Russian legislative constituency in Volgograd Oblast. The constituency covers central Volgograd and stretches to rural north-central Volgograd Oblast.

The constituency has been represented since 2026 by United Russia deputy Nikolay Nikolayev, former Lukoil vice president, who won the open seat after one-term United Russia incumbent Aleksey Volotskov ran for Volgograd Oblast Duma.

== Boundaries ==
1993–2007 Central constituency: Volgograd (Dzerzhinsky, Krasnooktyabrsky, Traktorozavodsky, Tsentralny, Voroshilovsky)
The constituency was confined entirely within Volgograd, covering most of the city, including the city centre.

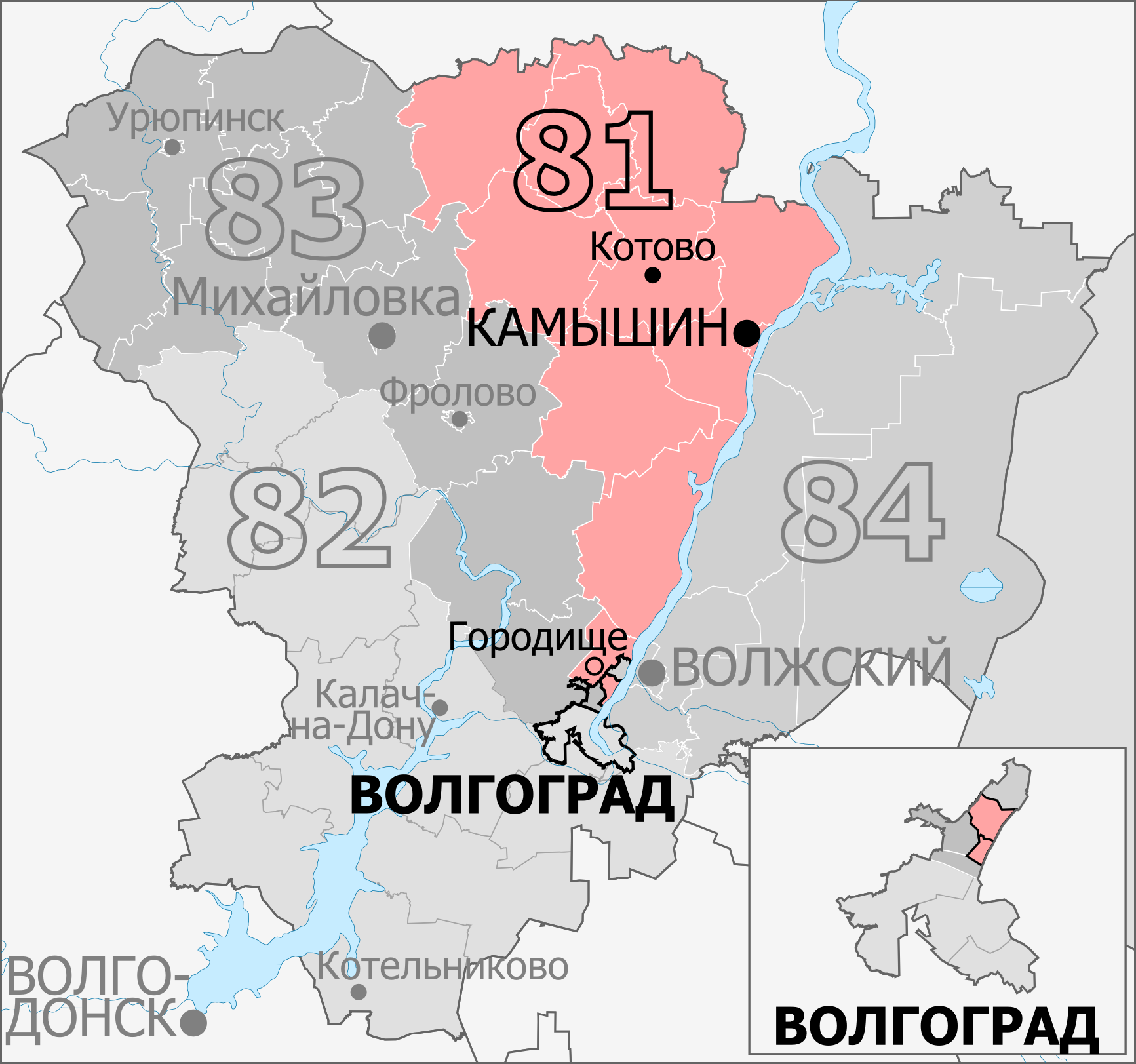
Constituency boundaries from 2016 to 2026

2016–2026: Danilovsky District, Dubovsky District, Gorodishchensky District (Gorodishche, Kamenskoye, Orlovskoye, Yerzovka), Kamyshin, Kamyshinsky District, Kotovsky District, Olkhovsky District, Rudnyansky District, Volgograd (Krasnooktyabrsky, Tsentralny), Yelansky District, Zhirnovsky District
The constituency was re-created for the 2016 election under the name "Volgograd constituency". This seat retained only Krasnooktyabrsky and Tsentralny city districts of Volgograd, losing the rest of the city to Mikhaylovka and Volzhsky constituencies. The constituency instead was pushed to the rural north, gaining Volgograd northern suburbs from the former Krasnoarmeysky constituency, Kamyshin, Dubovsky and Kamyshinsky districts from Volzhsky constituency, and the rest of north-central Volgograd Oblast – from Mikhaylovka constituency.

2026–present: Danilovsky District, Dubovsky District, Frolovo, Frolovsky District, Gorodishchensky District, Ilovlinsky District, Kamyshin, Kamyshinsky District, Kikvidzensky District, Kotovsky District, Olkhovsky District, Rudnyansky District, Volgograd (Dzerzhinsky, Tsentralny, Voroshilovsky), Yelansky District, Zhirnovsky District
After the 2025 redistricting Volgograd Oblast lost one of its four constituencies, so all remaining seats saw major changes. The constituency gained half of the former Mikhaylovka constituency to its west, including rural areas as well as Dzerzhinsky and Voroshilovsky city districts of Volgograd. This seat also lost Krasnooktyabrsky city district to neighbouring Volzhsky constituency.

== Members elected ==
| Election | Member | Party |
|---|---|---|
| 1993 | Igor Lukashyov | Yavlinsky–Boldyrev–Lukin |
| 1995 | Alevtina Aparina | Communist Party |
| 1999 | Yevgeny Ishchenko (Note: elected Head of Volgograd in September 2003) | Independent |
| 2003 | Vladimir Goryunov | Independent |
| 2007 | Proportional representation - no election by constituency | |
| 2011 | Proportional representation - no election by constituency | |
| 2016 | Anna Kuvychko | United Russia |
| 2021 | Aleksey Volotskov | United Russia |
| 2026 | Nikolay Nikolayev | United Russia |

== Election results ==
=== 1993 ===
Summary of the 12 December 1993 Russian legislative election in the Central constituency
| Candidate | Party | Votes | % |
|---|---|---|---|
| Igor Lukashyov | Yavlinsky–Boldyrev–Lukin | 53,513 | 21.69% |
| Nikolay Chuvalsky | Independent | – | – |
| Vladimir Goryunov | Independent | – | – |
| Vladimir Ignatyev | Independent | – | – |
| Lev Konstantinov | Independent | – | – |
| Vladimir Mazayev | Civic Union | – | – |
| Vladimir Mironenko | Russian Democratic Reform Movement | – | – |
| Anatoly Petrov | Democratic Party | – | – |
| Gennady Spiridonov | Independent | – | – |
| Sergey Sysoyev | Independent | – | – |
| Anatoly Yushchenko | Choice of Russia | – | – |
| Total | | 246,738 | 100% |

=== 1995 ===
Summary of the 17 December 1995 Russian legislative election in the Central constituency
| Candidate | Party | Votes | % |
|---|---|---|---|
| Alevtina Aparina | Communist Party | 86,108 | 28.71% |
| Igor Lukashyov (incumbent) | Yabloko | 45,921 | 15.31% |
| Aleksandr Polishchuk | Our Home – Russia | 42,458 | 14.16% |
| Oleg Karpenko | Liberal Democratic Party | 14,216 | 4.74% |
| Stanislav Terentyev | Union of Patriots | 13,729 | 4.58% |
| Anatoly Yushchenko | Democratic Choice of Russia – United Democrats | 8,730 | 2.91% |
| Aleksandr Gromov | Independent | 8,437 | 2.81% |
| Aleksandr Arzamastsev | Independent | 8,114 | 2.71% |
| Yury Titov | Independent | 7,928 | 2.64% |
| Zinaida Kutyavina | Independent | 4,394 | 1.46% |
| Vladimir Ignatyev | Independent | 4,081 | 1.36% |
| Valentin Vetoshkin | Russian All-People's Movement | 3,853 | 1.28% |
| Nikolay Mikhaylin | Forward, Russia! | 3,262 | 1.09% |
| Fyodor Nikulin | Independent | 2,692 | 0.90% |
| Konstantin Chuvilsky | Independent | 1,714 | 0.57% |
| Aleksandr Bondarenko | Independent | 1,612 | 0.54% |
| Vitaly Subota | Independent | 1,592 | 0.53% |
| Vladimir Moskalev | Independent | 1,547 | 0.52% |
| Andrey Kuprikov | Frontier Generation | 1,433 | 0.48% |
| Anatoly Yerokhin | Independent | 1,090 | 0.36% |
| Sergey Kopylov | Independent | 1,044 | 0.35% |
| Lyudmila Murtazaliyeva | Independent | 706 | 0.24% |
| Sergey Stolbin | Independent | 491 | 0.16% |
| against all | | 27,189 | 9.06% |
| Total | | 299,947 | 100% |

=== 1999 ===
Summary of the 19 December 1999 Russian legislative election in the Central constituency
| Candidate | Party | Votes | % |
|---|---|---|---|
| Yevgeny Ishchenko | Independent | 82,989 | 29.66% |
| Alevtina Aparina (incumbent) | Communist Party | 64,141 | 22.92% |
| Vladimir Goryunov | Our Home – Russia | 42,676 | 15.25% |
| Viktor Savenko | Independent | 36,147 | 12.92% |
| Stanislav Terentyev | Independent | 6,669 | 2.38% |
| Igor Lukashyov | Independent | 5,922 | 2.12% |
| Galina Lobacheva | Independent | 4,222 | 1.51% |
| Yevgeny Oleynikov | For Civil Dignity | 3,533 | 1.26% |
| Boris Pylin | Andrey Nikolayev and Svyatoslav Fyodorov Bloc | 3,073 | 1.10% |
| Yelena Yefimova | Liberal Democratic Party | 2,247 | 0.80% |
| Sergey Litvinenko | Independent | 1,088 | 0.39% |
| Oleg Karpenko | Russian Socialist Party | 822 | 0.29% |
| Aleksey Gudkov | Spiritual Heritage | 753 | 0.27% |
| Vladimir Zakharov | Independent | 663 | 0.24% |
| against all | | 21,590 | 7.72% |
| Total | | 279,795 | 100% |

=== 2003 ===
Summary of the 7 December 2003 Russian legislative election in the Central constituency
| Candidate | Party | Votes | % |
|---|---|---|---|
| Vladimir Goryunov | Independent | 90,748 | 37.33% |
| Yevgeny Ishchenko | Independent | 69,241 | 28.48% |
| Aleksandr Golovanchikov | Independent | 31,175 | 12.82% |
| Aleksey Koskov | Great Russia – Eurasian Union | 4,693 | 1.93% |
| Igor Zaostrovsky | Independent | 3,799 | 1.56% |
| against all | | 38,248 | 15.73% |
| Total | | 243,447 | 100% |

=== 2016 ===
Summary of the 18 September 2016 Russian legislative election in the Volgograd constituency
| Candidate | Party | Votes | % |
|---|---|---|---|
| Anna Kuvychko | United Russia | 83,653 | 41.59% |
| Mikhail Tarantsov | Communist Party | 44,692 | 22.22% |
| Yury Chekalin | Liberal Democratic Party | 20,622 | 10.25% |
| Oleg Mikheyev | A Just Russia | 18,185 | 9.04% |
| Anatoly Barankevich | Patriots of Russia | 8,813 | 4.38% |
| Sergey Dorokhov | Communists of Russia | 7,639 | 3.80% |
| Sergey Korostin | Yabloko | 3,822 | 1.90% |
| Dmitry Nikitin | People's Freedom Party | 3,680 | 1.83% |
| Eduard Protopopov | The Greens | 3,223 | 1.60% |
| Total | | 201,145 | 100% |

=== 2021 ===
Summary of the 17-19 September 2021 Russian legislative election in the Volgograd constituency
| Candidate | Party | Votes | % |
|---|---|---|---|
| Aleksey Volotskov | United Russia | 173,864 | 61.67% |
| Yelena Svetlichnaya | Communist Party | 38,783 | 13.76% |
| Alla Lukyanova | A Just Russia — For Truth | 18,720 | 6.64% |
| Aleksey Kononenko | Liberal Democratic Party | 17,286 | 6.13% |
| Vitaly Filareyev | New People | 9,895 | 3.51% |
| Sergey Chukhayev | Party of Pensioners | 8,204 | 2.91% |
| Leonid Pyltsin | Party of Growth | 5,897 | 2.09% |
| Viktoria Sopoleva | Rodina | 4,323 | 1.53% |
| Total | | 281,920 | 100% |

=== 2026 ===
Summary of the 18-20 September 2026 Russian legislative election in the Volgograd constituency
| Candidate | Party | Votes | % |
|---|---|---|---|
| Nikolay Nikolayev | United Russia | 212,317 | 54.09% |
| Andrey Shevchenko | Communist Party | 64,899 | 16.53% |
| Vladislav Nikonenko | Liberal Democratic Party | 40,544 | 10.33% |
| Aleksandr Pugachev | A Just Russia | 20,145 | 5.13% |
| Kirill Bochkov | New People | 19,902 | 5.07% |
| Igor Surovikin | Party of Pensioners | 18,575 | 4.73% |
| Darya Kazakova | The Greens | 10,655 | 2.71% |
| Total | | 392,495 | 100% |
