= Dubovka Urban Settlement =

Dubovka Urban Settlement is the name of several municipal formations in Russia.

- Dubovka Urban Settlement, a municipal formation which the Urban-Type Settlement of Dubovka in Uzlovsky District of Tula Oblast is incorporated as
- Dubovka Urban Settlement, a municipal formation which the town of district significance of Dubovka in Dubovsky District of Volgograd Oblast is incorporated as

== See also ==
- Dubovka, several inhabited localities in Russia
