= Solodcha, Olkhovsky District, Volgograd Oblast =

Solodcha Солодча
- Selo
- Location within Volgograd Oblast Location within Russia
- Coordinates: 49°38′N 44°17′E
- Country: Russia
- Region: Volgograd Oblast
- District: Olkhovsky District
- Time zone: UTC+4:00

Solodcha (Russian: Соло́дча) is a rural locality (a selo) and the administrative center of Solodchinskoye Rural Settlement, Olkhovsky District, Volgograd Oblast, Russia. The population was 1,572 as of 2010. There are 10 streets.

== Geography ==
Solodcha is located in steppe, on the Volga Upland, on the right bank of the Ilovlya River, 35 km southwest of Olkhovka (the district's administrative centre) by road. Stefanidovka is the nearest rural locality.
