= Kamenny Brod, Volgograd Oblast =

Kamenny Brod Каменный Брод
- Selo
- Location within Volgograd Oblast Location within Russia
- Coordinates: 49°49′N 44°28′E
- Country: Russia
- Region: Volgograd Oblast
- District: Olkhovsky District
- Time zone: UTC+4:00

Kamenny Brod (Russian: Ка́менный Брод) is a rural locality (a selo) and the administrative center of Kamennobrodskoye Rural Settlement, Olkhovsky District, Volgograd Oblast, Russia. The population was 414 as of 2010. There are 4 streets.

== Geography ==
Kamenny Brod is located 9 km southwest of Olkhovka (the district's administrative centre) by road. Olkhovka is the nearest rural locality.
