= Pochta =

Pochta Почта
- Khutor
- Location within Volgograd Oblast Location within Russia
- Coordinates: 49°14′N 44°52′E
- Country: Russia
- Region: Volgograd Oblast
- District: Dubovsky District
- Time zone: UTC+4:00

Pochta (Russian: Почта) is a rural locality (a khutor) in Gornovodyanovskoye Rural Settlement, Dubovsky District, Volgograd Oblast, Russia. The population was 8 as of 2010.

== Geography ==
Pochta is located in steppe, 25 km north of Dubovka (the district's administrative centre) by road. Gornovodyanoye is the nearest rural locality.
