= Malaya Ivanovka, Volgograd Oblast =

Malaya Ivanovka Малая Ивановка
- Selo
- Location within Volgograd Oblast Location within Russia
- Coordinates: 49°21′11″N 44°32′01″E
- Country: Russia
- Region: Volgograd Oblast
- District: Dubovsky District
- Founded: 1832
- Elevation: 116 m (381 ft)
- Time zone: UTC+4:00
- Postal code: 404023
- Area code: 84458

Malaya Ivanovka (Russian: Ма́лая Ива́новка) is a rural locality (a selo) and the administrative center of Maloivanovskoye Rural Settlement, Dubovsky District, Volgograd Oblast, Russia. The population was 670 as of 2010. There are 4 streets.

== Geography ==
Malaya Ivanovka is located 55 km northwest of Dubovka (the district's administrative centre) by road. Loznoye is the nearest rural locality.

== History ==
According to Alexander Minkh's 1900 historical-geographic dictionary of Saratov Governorate, Malaya Ivanovka was a volost village of the 2nd district of Tsaritsyn Uyezd, seat of Ivanovskaya volost. It was settled in 1832–33 by state peasants relocating from Tambov, Kharkov, and Voronezh governorates.

An Ivanovskaya volost administrative office for state peasants opened in the 1840s. In 1851, parishioners built a wooden church dedicated to the Intercession of the Theotokos, consecrated on 5 November 1855 (Old Style).

By 1858, Malaya Ivanovka had 669 male revision souls. By 1860 it had 141 households and a population of 1,360, and had a school. By 1882 it had 320 households and a population of 1,878. By 1894 it had 361 households — including four public buildings (the volost administration, a school, a church guardhouse, and a priest's house) — of which 69 were built of stone or adobe and the rest of wood; 118 houses had board roofs and the rest were thatched. The total population that year was 2,239.

== Population ==
| 1897 | 1911 |
|---|---|
| 2,477 | 2,548 |
