= Studyonovka =

Studyonovka Студёновка
- Khutor
- Location within Volgograd Oblast Location within Russia
- Coordinates: 49°43′N 45°07′E
- Country: Russia
- Region: Volgograd Oblast
- District: Olkhovsky District
- Time zone: UTC+4:00

Studyonovka (Russian: Студёновка) is a rural locality (a khutor) in Romanovskoye Rural Settlement, Olkhovsky District, Volgograd Oblast, Russia. The population was 20 as of 2010.

== Geography ==
Studyonovka is located in steppe, on the Volga Upland, on the bank of the Balykleyka River, 51 km southeast of Olkhovka (the district's administrative centre) by road. Romanovka is the nearest rural locality.
