= Zakharovka (selo), Volgograd Oblast =

Zakharovka Захаровка
- Selo
- Location within Volgograd Oblast Location within Russia
- Coordinates: 49°42′N 44°21′E
- Country: Russia
- Region: Volgograd Oblast
- District: Olkhovsky District
- Time zone: UTC+4:00

Zakharovka (Russian: Заха́ровка) is a rural locality (a selo) in Solodchinskoye Rural Settlement, Olkhovsky District, Volgograd Oblast, Russia. The population was 258 as of 2010. There are 5 streets.

== Geography ==
Zakharovka is located in steppe, on the right bank of the Ilovlya River, 25 km southwest of Olkhovka (the district's administrative centre) by road. Dmitriyevka is the nearest rural locality.
