= Loznoye =

Loznoye Лозное
- Selo
- Location within Volgograd Oblast Location within Russia
- Coordinates: 49°17′N 44°25′E
- Country: Russia
- Region: Volgograd Oblast
- District: Dubovsky District
- Time zone: UTC+4:00

Loznoye (Russian: Ло́зное) is a rural locality (a selo) and the administrative center of Loznovskoye Rural Settlement, Dubovsky District, Volgograd Oblast, Russia. The population was 1,356 as of 2010. There are 20 streets.

== Geography ==
Loznoye is located 42 km northwest of Dubovka (the district's administrative centre) by road. Malaya Ivanovka is the nearest rural locality.
