= Lipovka, Volgograd Oblast =

Lipovka Липовка
- Selo
- Location within Volgograd Oblast Location within Russia
- Coordinates: 49°46′N 44°55′E
- Country: Russia
- Region: Volgograd Oblast
- District: Olkhovsky District
- Time zone: UTC+4:00

Lipovka (Russian: Ли́повка) is a rural locality (a selo) and the administrative center of Lipovskoye Rural Settlement, Olkhovsky District, Volgograd Oblast, Russia. The population was 1,063 as of 2010. There are 12 streets.

== Geography ==
Lipovka is located in steppe, on the Volga Upland, 34 km southeast of Olkhovka (the district's administrative centre) by road. Shchepkin is the nearest rural locality.
