= Kireyevo =

Kireyevo Киреево
- Selo
- Location within Volgograd Oblast Location within Russia
- Coordinates: 50°00′N 44°28′E
- Country: Russia
- Region: Volgograd Oblast
- District: Olkhovsky District
- Time zone: UTC+4:00

Kireyevo (Russian: Киреево) is a rural locality (a selo) and the administrative center of Kireyevskoye Rural Settlement, Olkhovsky District, Volgograd Oblast, Russia. The population was 968 as of 2010. There are 23 streets.

== Geography ==
Kireyevo is located in steppe, on the Chertoleyka River, 21 km northwest of Olkhovka (the district's administrative centre) by road. Razuvayev is the nearest rural locality.
