= Boykiye Dvoriki =

Boykiye Dvoriki Бойкие Дворики
- Khutor
- Location within Volgograd Oblast Location within Russia
- Coordinates: 49°12′N 44°34′E
- Country: Russia
- Region: Volgograd Oblast
- District: Dubovsky District
- Time zone: UTC+4:00

Boykiye Dvoriki (Russian: Бойкие Дворики) is a rural locality (a khutor) in Loznovskoye Rural Settlement, Dubovsky District, Volgograd Oblast, Russia. The population was 103 as of 2010. There are 3 streets.

== Geography ==
Boykiye Dvoriki is located in steppe, 28 km northwest of Dubovka (the district's administrative centre) by road. Pryamaya Balka is the nearest rural locality.
