= Klinovka, Volgograd Oblast =

Klinovka Клиновка
- Selo
- Location within Volgograd Oblast Location within Russia
- Coordinates: 49°53′N 44°31′E
- Country: Russia
- Region: Volgograd Oblast
- District: Olkhovsky District
- Time zone: UTC+4:00

Klinovka (Russian: Кли́новка) is a rural locality (a selo) in Olkhovskoye Rural Settlement, Olkhovsky District, Volgograd Oblast, Russia. The population was 257 as of 2010. There are 6 streets.

== Geography ==
Klinovka is located in steppe, on the Olkhovka River, 6 km northwest of Olkhovka (the district's administrative centre) by road. Olkhovka is the nearest rural locality.
