= Krasnoarmeysky constituency (Volgograd Oblast) =

Legislative constituency in Russia

Krasnoarmeysky single-member constituency
- Constituency of the Russian State Duma

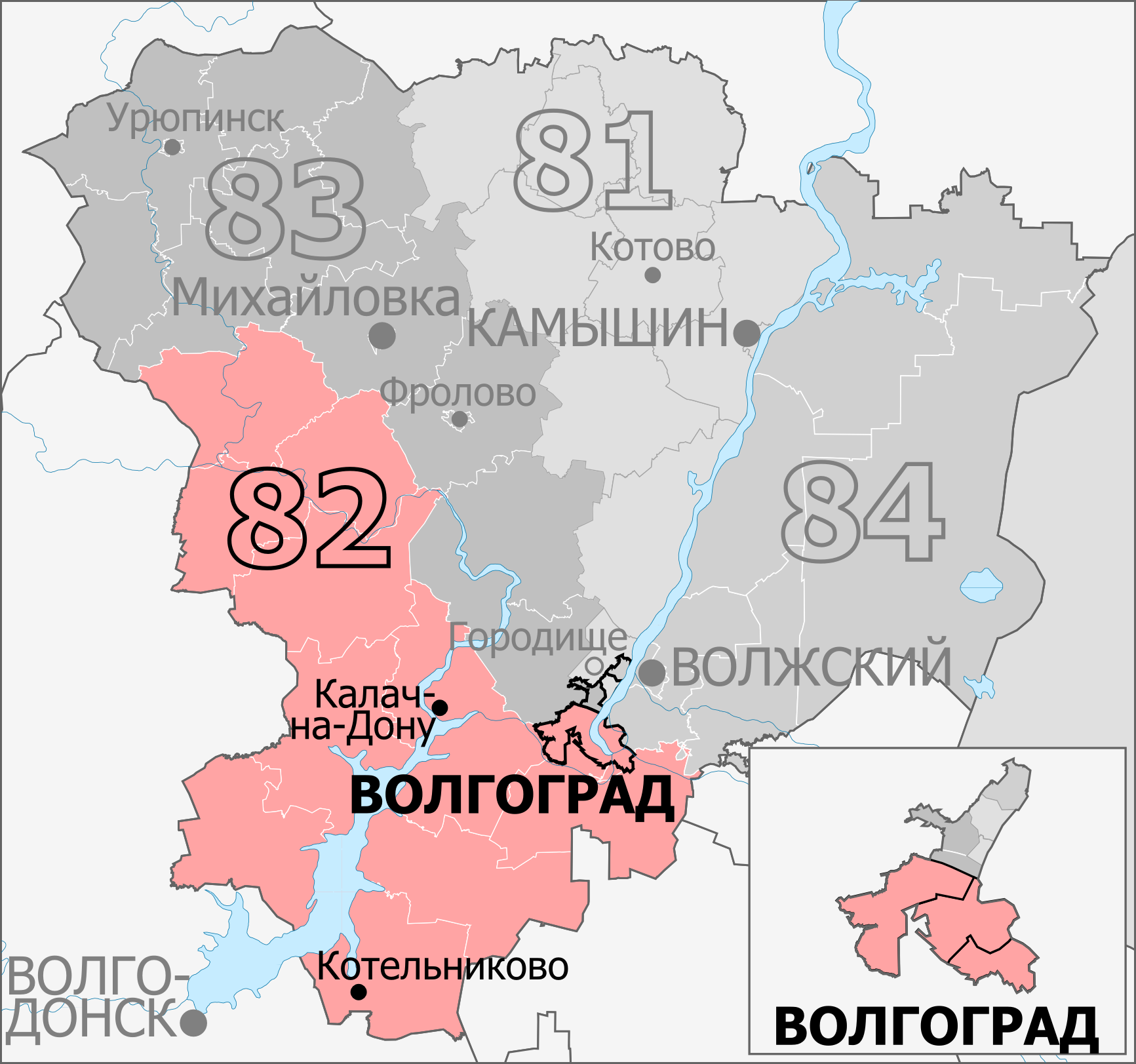
- Constituency boundaries from 2016 to 2026
- Deputy: None
- Federal subject: Volgograd Oblast
- Districts: Chernyshkovsky, Kalachyovsky, Kletsky, Kotelnikovsky, Kumylzhensky, Oktyabrsky, Serafimovichsky, Surovikinsky, Svetloyarsky, Volgograd (Kirovsky, Krasnoarmeysky, Sovetsky)
- Voters: 461,792 (2021)

The Krasnoarmeysky constituency (No.82 (Note: No.70 in 1993-1995, No.69 in 1995-2003, No.71 in 2003-2007)) was a Russian legislative constituency in Volgograd Oblast in 1993–2007 and 2016–2026. The constituency covered southern Volgograd as well as southern Volgograd Oblast. After 2025 redistricting Volgograd Oblast lost one of its four constituencies, so Krasnoarmeysky constituency was dissolved and absorbed by Mikhaylovka constituency.

The constituency was last represented by United Russia deputy Andrey Gimbatov, former First Deputy Chairman of the Volgograd City Duma and businessman, who won the open seat in 2021, succeeding one-term United Russia incumbent Tatyana Tsybizova. Gimbatov was re-elected to the State Duma in 2026 in the Mikhaylovka constituency.

== Boundaries ==
1993–2007: Chernyshkovsky District, Gorodishchensky District, Kalachyovsky District, Kotelnikovsky District, Oktyabrsky District, Surovikinsky District, Svetloyarsky District, Volgograd (Kirovsky, Krasnoarmeysky, Sovetsky)
The constituency covered southern Volgograd as well as rural areas to the south and south-west of the city.

2016–2026: Chernyshkovsky District, Kalachyovsky District, Kletsky District, Kotelnikovsky District, Kumylzhensky District, Oktyabrsky District, Serafimovichsky District, Surovikinsky District, Svetloyarsky District, Volgograd (Kirovsky, Krasnoarmeysky, Sovetsky)
The constituency was re-created for the 2016 election and retained mots of its former territory, losing only Gorodishchensky District to Volgograd and Mikhaylovka constituencies. This seat was instead pushed northwards, gaining rural Kletsky, Kumylzhensky and Serafimovichsky districts from Mikhaylovka constituency.

== Members elected ==
Election	Member	Party
1993	Vladimir Kosykh	Independent
1995	Mikhail Tarantsov	Communist Party
1999	Vasily Galushkin	Independent
2003	Vasily Galushkin	United Russia
2007	Proportional representation - no election by constituency	
2011	Proportional representation - no election by constituency	
2016	Tatyana Tsybizova	United Russia
2021	Andrey Gimbatov	United Russia

== Election results ==
=== 1993 ===
==== Declared candidates ====
- Vladimir Bush (YaBL), Volgograd Institute of Architecture and Civil Engineering department of political economy head
- Vladimir Chaplygin (Independent), agriculture businessman
- Yevgeny Ilyasov (Independent), vocational college director
- Vladimir Kosykh (Independent), Deputy Chief of Volgograd Oblast Militsiya (1993–present)
- Viktor Kusakin (Independent), sovkhoz director (previously ran as APR candidate)
- Svetlana Umetskaya (Choice of Russia), former People's Deputy of Russia (1990–1993)

==== Results ====
Summary of the 12 December 1993 Russian legislative election in the Krasnoarmeysky constituency
Candidate	Party	Votes	%
Vladimir Kosykh	Independent	43,649	16.84%
Svetlana Umetskaya	Choice of Russia	43,386	16.74%
Vladimir Bush	Yavlinsky–Boldyrev–Lukin	41,934	16.18%
Viktor Kusakin	Independent	38,419	14.82%
Yevgeny Ilyasov	Independent	16,112	6.22%
Vladimir Chaplygin	Independent	14,719	5.68%
against all		43,427	16.75%
Total		259,227	100%

=== 1995 ===
==== Declared candidates ====
- Valery Bgashev (Independent), entrepreneur
- Valentina Bukina (Yabloko), Deputy Head of the State Committee on Antimonopoly Policy Regional Office
- Vladimir Bush (PGL), Volgograd Academy of Architecture and Civil Engineering associate professor, 1993 YaBL candidate for this seat
- Nikolay Cherkasov (APR), kolkhoz chairman
- Yevgeny Chigrin (Independent), Russian community coordinator
- Lyudmila Ishunina (PST), privatization fund manager
- Valentin Kantemirov (Forward, Russia!), chief counsel to the Volgograd Oblast Duma
- Aleksandr Karpenko (LDPR), party coordinator in Volgograd
- Vasily Khomutov (NDR), agriculture businessman
- Vladimir Kosykh (BIR), incumbent Member of State Duma (1994–present)
- Aleksandr Losev (Union of Patriots), former Member of Volgograd Oblast Council of People's Deputies (1990–1993), journalist
- Gennady Medentsov (PPR–ST), Member of State Duma (1994–present)
- Sergey Nizhegorodtsev (AAR), attorney
- Vladimir Sabuk (Independent), military unit commander
- Vladimir Sidorov (Russian Party), chemical plant director
- Mikhail Tarantsov (CPRF), Member of Volgograd Oblast Duma (1994–present)
- Renary Tarasov (V–N!), distillery director
- Vladimir Tibirkov (K–TR–zSS), power engineer
- Nadezhda Voloshenko (ROD), physician
- Vladimir Yevtushenko (Independent), Volgograd administration official

==== Results ====
Summary of the 17 December 1995 Russian legislative election in the Krasnoarmeysky constituency
Candidate	Party	Votes	%
Mikhail Tarantsov	Communist Party	73,493	24.22%
Aleksandr Karpenko	Liberal Democratic Party	28,445	9.37%
Vasily Khomutov	Our Home – Russia	27,295	8.99%
Valentina Burkina	Yabloko	22,135	7.29%
Vladimir Kosykh (incumbent)	Ivan Rybkin Bloc	12,573	4.14%
Vladimir Bush	Pamfilova–Gurov–Lysenko	12,095	3.99%
Nikolay Cherkasov	Agrarian Party	11,330	3.73%
Lyudmila Ishunina	Party of Workers' Self-Government	11,268	3.71%
Aleksandr Losev	Union of Patriots	11,234	3.70%
Vladimir Yevtushenko	Independent	10,107	3.33%
Sergey Nizhegorodov	Russian Lawyers' Association	9,698	3.20%
Valentin Kantemirov	Forward, Russia!	9,308	3.07%
Vladimir Tibirkov	Communists and Working Russia - for the Soviet Union	7,256	2.39%
Renary Tarasov	Power to the People	5,588	1.84%
Nadezhda Voloshenko	Russian All-People's Movement	5,508	1.81%
Gennady Medentsov	Trade Unions and Industrialists – Union of Labour	4,725	1.56%
Vladimir Sabuk	Independent	3,963	1.31%
Vladimir Sidorov	Russian Party	2,938	0.97%
Yevgeny Chigrin	Independent	1,719	0.57%
Valery Bgashev	Independent	1,497	0.49%
against all		24,966	8.23%
Total		303,500	100%

=== 1999 ===
==== Declared candidates ====
- Vasily Galushkin (Independent), First Deputy Governor of Volgograd Oblast (1997–present)
- Aleksandr Kononenko (DN), Volgograd administration official
- Valery Mokrenko (NDR), aide to State Duma member
- Nikolay Serdyukov (Independent), journalist
- Mikhail Tarantsov (CPRF), incumbent Member of State Duma (1996–present)

==== Withdrawn candidates ====
- Aleksandr Karpenko (LDPR), party coordinator in Volgograd, 1995 candidate for this seat
- Andrey Samokhin (Independent), agriculture businessman

==== Did not file ====
- Tatyana Rabochaya (RSP), notary
- Vyacheslav Sakhno (Nikolayev–Fyodorov Bloc), liquidation manager
- Aleksandr Sklyarov (Stalin Bloc), military commissariat department head

==== Results ====
Summary of the 19 December 1999 Russian legislative election in the Krasnoarmeysky constituency
Candidate	Party	Votes	%
Vasily Galushkin	Independent	112,707	40.00%
Mikhail Tarantsov (incumbent)	Communist Party	72,219	25.63%
Nikolay Serdyukov	Independent	50,501	17.92%
Aleksandr Kononenko	Spiritual Heritage	3,749	1.33%
Valery Mokrenko	Our Home – Russia	3,331	1.18%
against all		33,206	11.78%
Total		281,767	100%

=== 2003 ===
==== Declared candidates ====
- Sergey Borisov (Independent), housing cooperative deputy chairman
- Vasily Galushkin (United Russia), incumbent Member of State Duma (2000–present), 2000 gubernatorial candidate
- Andrey Gorbanov (ORP Rus'), aide to State Duma member Frants Klintsevich, nonprofit vice president
- Mikhail Tarantsov (CPRF), Commissioner for Human Rights in Volgograd Oblast (2000–present), former Member of State Duma (1996–1999)

==== Withdrawn candidates ====
- Sergey Aparin (Independent), former chief of Volzhsky militsiya (1985–1999)
- Aleksandr Kulikov (Union), pensioner

==== Failed to qualify ====
- Sergey Bezverkhy (NPSRF), oil businessman
- Aleksandr Orlov (KPR), construction executive
- Aleksandr Sviridov (LDPR), private security company deputy director, water polo coach

==== Results ====
Summary of the 7 December 2003 Russian legislative election in the Krasnoarmeysky constituency
Candidate	Party	Votes	%
Vasily Galushkin (incumbent)	United Russia	97,832	39.54%
Mikhail Tarantsov	Communist Party	65,394	26.43%
Andrey Gorbanov	United Russian Party Rus'	18,020	7.28%
Sergey Borisov	Independent	4,574	1.85%
against all		53,259	21.53%
Total		247,670	100%

=== 2016 ===
==== Declared candidates ====
- Galina Boldyreva (Yabloko), chairwoman of the party regional office
- Aleksey Burov (CPRF), Member of Volgograd Oblast Duma (2014–present), director of the Plekhanov Russian University of Economics, Volgograd branch (2005–present)
- Dmitry Kalashnikov (A Just Russia), Member of Volgograd Oblast Duma (2014–present)
- Dmitry Krylov (Patriots of Russia), Member of Volgograd City Duma (2013–present), television broadcasting businessman
- Vadim Merkulov (PARNAS), social worker
- Oleg Orlov (LDPR), construction executive
- Tatyana Tsybizova (United Russia), Member of Volgograd Oblast Duma (2003–present)

==== Withdrawn candidates ====
- Dmitry Rastrygin (CPCR), homemaker

==== Failed to qualify ====
- Vladimir Polosukhin (The Greens), chairman of the party regional office
- Oleg Savchenko (RPPS), Member of State Duma (2003–present), 2000 and 2004 gubernatorial candidate, United Russia primary candidate (party list of candidates was not certified)

==== Did not file ====
- Lyudmila Kopach (Independent), individual entrepreneur
- Irina Krasilnikova (Independent), unemployed

==== Declined ====
- Eduard Davydovsky (United Russia), Member of Volgograd Oblast Duma (2015–present), cossack cadet corps director (lost the primary)

==== Results ====
Summary of the 18 September 2016 Russian legislative election in the Krasnoarmeysky constituency
Candidate	Party	Votes	%
Tatyana Tsybizova	United Russia	84,314	44.46%
Dmitry Krylov	Patriots of Russia	25,906	13.66%
Aleksey Burov	Communist Party	23,741	12.52%
Oleg Orlov	Liberal Democratic Party	19,313	10.18%
Dmitry Kalashnikov	A Just Russia	19,301	10.18%
Galina Boldyreva	Yabloko	7,131	3.76%
Vadim Merkulov	People's Freedom Party	2,729	1.44%
Total		189,632	100%

=== 2021 ===
==== Declared candidates ====
- Andrey Annenko (CPRF), Member of Volgograd City Duma (2018–present), lawyer
- Andrey Gimbatov (United Russia), First Deputy Chairman of the Volgograd City Duma (2019–present), Member of the City Duma (2016–present)
- Natalya Gromova (The Greens), individual entrepreneur
- Dmitry Kalashnikov (SR–ZP), Deputy Chairman of the Volgograd Oblast Duma (2019–present), Member of the Oblast Duma (2014–present), 2016 candidate for this seat
- Aleksandr Klyuchnikov (Rodina), pensioner
- Georgy Kozitsky (Party of Growth), former Member of Volgograd Oblast Duma (2003–2009), advertising businessman
- Aleksandr Kuzmin (LDPR), Member of Volgograd Oblast Duma (2019–present), businessman
- Sergey Lobov (New People), caretaker
- Stanislav Pluzhnikov (RPPSS), dispatcher

==== Failed to qualify ====
- Timofey Pershin (Independent), self-employed
- Roman Sebekin (Yabloko), businessman, ecological activist

==== Declined ====
- Tatyana Tsybizova (United Russia), incumbent Member of State Duma (2016–present)

==== Results ====
Summary of the 17-19 September 2021 Russian legislative election in the Krasnoarmeysky constituency
Candidate	Party	Votes	%
Andrey Gimbatov	United Russia	171,289	56.14%
Andrey Annenko	Communist Party	44,024	14.43%
Dmitry Kalashnikov	A Just Russia — For Truth	37,739	12.37%
Aleksandr Kuzmin	Liberal Democratic Party	19,591	6.42%
Stanislav Pluzhnikov	Party of Pensioners	7,095	2.33%
Sergey Lobov	New People	7,060	2.31%
Natalya Gromova	The Greens	6,772	2.22%
Aleksandr Klyuchnikov	Rodina	3,545	1.16%
Georgy Kozitsky	Party of Growth	1,950	0.64%
Total		305,137	100%
