= Novoolkhovka =

Novoolkhovka Новоольховка
- Khutor
- Location within Volgograd Oblast Location within Russia
- Coordinates: 50°05′N 44°24′E
- Country: Russia
- Region: Volgograd Oblast
- District: Olkhovsky District
- Time zone: UTC+4:00

Novoolkhovka (Russian: Новоольховка) is a rural locality (a khutor) in Gurovskoye Rural Settlement, Olkhovsky District, Volgograd Oblast, Russia. The population was 188 as of 2010. There are four streets.

== Geography ==
Novoolkhovka is located in steppe, on the Olkhovka River, 31 km northwest of Olkhovka (the district's administrative centre) by road. Gurovo is the nearest rural locality.
