= Novorossiyskoye =

Novorossiyskoye Новороссийское
- Selo
- Location within Volgograd Oblast Location within Russia
- Coordinates: 49°41′N 44°39′E
- Country: Russia
- Region: Volgograd Oblast
- District: Olkhovsky District
- Time zone: UTC+4:00

Novorossiyskoye (Russian: Новоросси́йское) is a rural locality (a selo) in Yagodnovskoye Rural Settlement, Olkhovsky District, Volgograd Oblast, Russia. The population was 8 as of 2010. There are 2 streets.

== Geography ==
Novorossiyskoye is located in steppe, on the Volga Upland, 23 km (14 mi) southeast of Olkhovka (the district's administrative centre) by road. Oktyabrsky is the nearest rural locality.
