= Pryamaya Balka =

Pryamaya Balka Прямая Балка
- Selo
- Location within Volgograd Oblast Location within Russia
- Coordinates: 49°14′N 44°43′E
- Country: Russia
- Region: Volgograd Oblast
- District: Dubovsky District
- Time zone: UTC+4:00

Pryamaya Balka (Russian: Прямая Балка) is a rural locality (a selo) and the administrative center of Pryamobalkinskoye Rural Settlement, Dubovsky District, Volgograd Oblast, Russia. The population was 645 as of 2010. There are 17 streets.

== Geography ==
Pryamaya Balka is located on the right bank of the Olenya River, 32 km northwest of Dubovka (the district's administrative centre) by road. Davydovka is the nearest rural locality.
