= Stefanidovka =

Stefanidovka Стефанидовка
- Selo
- Location within Volgograd Oblast Location within Russia
- Coordinates: 49°36′N 44°18′E
- Country: Russia
- Region: Volgograd Oblast
- District: Olkhovsky District
- Time zone: UTC+4:00

Stefanidovka (Russian: Стефани́довка) is a rural locality (a selo) in Solodchinskoye Rural Settlement, Olkhovsky District, Volgograd Oblast, Russia. The population was 120 as of 2010. There are 2 streets.

== Geography ==
Stefanidovka is located in steppe, on the Volga Upland, on the right bank of the Ilovlya River, 38 km southwest of Olkhovka (the district's administrative centre) by road. Solodcha is the nearest rural locality.
