= Gurovo, Olkhovsky District, Volgograd Oblast =

Gurovo Гурово
- Khutor
- Location within Volgograd Oblast Location within Russia
- Coordinates: 50°04′N 44°24′E
- Country: Russia
- Region: Volgograd Oblast
- District: Olkhovsky District
- Time zone: UTC+4:00

Gurovo (Russian: Гурово) is a rural locality (a khutor) and the administrative center of Gurovskoye Rural Settlement, Olkhovsky District, Volgograd Oblast, Russia. The population was 539 as of 2010. There are 7 streets.

== Geography ==
Gurovo is located in steppe, on the Olkhovka River, 28 km northwest of Olkhovka (the district's administrative centre) by road. Kireyevo is the nearest rural locality.
