= Olenye =

Olenye Оленье
- Selo
- Location within Volgograd Oblast Location within Russia
- Coordinates: 49°10′N 44°52′E
- Country: Russia
- Region: Volgograd Oblast
- District: Dubovsky District
- Time zone: UTC+4:00

Olenye (Russian: Оленье) is a rural locality (a selo) and the administrative center of Olenyevskoye Rural Settlement, Dubovsky District, Volgograd Oblast, Russia. The population was 1,012 as of 2010. There are 39 streets.

== Geography ==
Olenye is located on the right bank of the Volga River, 16 kilometers north of Dubovka (the district's administrative centre) by road, on the shore of the Olenevsky Bay of the Volgograd reservoir, is the center of the Olenevsky village council, whose area is 12 thousand hectares. In 3 km (the southern slope of the Ekaterininskaya gully) there is a spring with drinking water - the state natural monument “Ekaterininsky Spring”.

== History ==
One of the versions of the name of the village is from two ravines (ravines) similar to the antlers of a deer. Opposite the village "soldier's gully" - in the forest of which men allegedly were hiding, who were subject to recruitment for 25 years of service in the soldiers. According to the List of Populated Areas of the Tsaritsyn District in 1911, the village of Olenye (aka Dvoryanka) belonged to the Peskovatskaya Volost. In the village there was a school, a church, a feldsher-obstetric station. The village was inhabited by former state peasants. The peasants of the village constituted one rural society.

== Economy ==
The main sectors of the Olenye economy are agriculture. The village has a school, a medical facility, shops, partially gasified, a road with a bus connection: Volgograd and Kamyshin. 3.5 km to the north-west is the Yekaterininskoye deposit of quartz sands. The raw materials extracted there are supplied to the only special oil materials plant in Russia, Gazprom, or possibly one of Bashneft's plants.
