= Pogozhya Balka =

Pogozhya Balka Погожья Балка
- Khutor
- Location within Volgograd Oblast Location within Russia
- Coordinates: 49°54′N 44°16′E
- Country: Russia
- Region: Volgograd Oblast
- District: Olkhovsky District
- Time zone: UTC+4:00

Pogozhya Balka (Russian: Погожья Балка) is a rural locality (a khutor) in Nezhinskoye Rural Settlement, Olkhovsky District, Volgograd Oblast, Russia. The population was 157 as of 2010. There are 2 streets.

== Geography ==
Pogozhya Balka is located in steppe, on the Volga Upland, 28 km northwest of Olkhovka (the district's administrative centre) by road. Nezhinsky is the nearest rural locality.
