= Spartak, Volgograd Oblast =

Spartak Спартак
- Khutor
- Location within Volgograd Oblast Location within Russia
- Coordinates: 49°07′N 44°31′E
- Country: Russia
- Region: Volgograd Oblast
- District: Dubovsky District
- Time zone: UTC+4:00

Spartak (Russian: Спартак) is a rural locality (a khutor) in Loznovskoye Rural Settlement, Dubovsky District, Volgograd Oblast, Russia. The population was 88 as of 2010. There are 2 streets.

== Geography ==
Spartak is located in steppe, on the left bank of the Tishanka River, 42 km northwest of Dubovka (the district's administrative centre) by road. Sadki is the nearest rural locality.
