= Zaburunny =

Zaburunny Забурунный
- Khutor
- Location within Volgograd Oblast Location within Russia
- Coordinates: 49°56′N 44°45′E
- Country: Russia
- Region: Volgograd Oblast
- District: Olkhovsky District
- Time zone: UTC+4:00

Zaburunny (Russian: Забурунный) is a rural locality (a khutor) in Gusyovskoye Rural Settlement, Olkhovsky District, Volgograd Oblast, Russia. The population was 156 as of 2010. There are 3 streets.

== Geography ==
Zaburunny is located in steppe, on the right bank of the Ilovlya River, 30 km northwest of Olkhovka (the district's administrative centre) by road. Gusyovka is the nearest rural locality.
