= Chelyuskinets =

Chelyuskinets Челюскинец
- Khutor
- Location within Volgograd Oblast Location within Russia
- Coordinates: 49°02′N 44°39′E
- Country: Russia
- Region: Volgograd Oblast
- District: Dubovsky District
- Time zone: UTC+4:00

Chelyuskinets (Russian: Челюскинец) is a rural locality (a khutor) in Pichuzhinskoye Rural Settlement, Dubovsky District, Volgograd Oblast, Russia. The population was 347 as of 2010. There are 12 streets.

== Geography ==
Chelyuskinets is located in steppe, on the Pichuga River, 20 km northeast of Dubovka (the district's administrative centre) by road. Pichuga is the nearest rural locality.
