= Strelnoshirokoye =

Strelnoshirokoye Стрельноширокое
- Selo
- Location within Volgograd Oblast Location within Russia
- Coordinates: 49°18′N 44°56′E
- Country: Russia
- Region: Volgograd Oblast
- District: Dubovsky District
- Time zone: UTC+4:00

Strelnoshirokoye (Russian: Стрельноширокое) is a rural locality (a selo) and the administrative center of Stelnoshirokovskoye Rural Settlement, Dubovsky District, Volgograd Oblast, Russia. The population was 720 as of 2010. There are 9 streets.

== Geography ==
Strelnoshirokoye is located in steppe, 41 km northeast of Dubovka (the district's administrative centre) by road. Rodniki is the nearest rural locality.
