= Peskovatsky =

Peskovatsky Песковатский
- Khutor
- Location within Volgograd Oblast Location within Russia
- Coordinates: 49°58′N 44°17′E
- Country: Russia
- Region: Volgograd Oblast
- District: Olkhovsky District
- Time zone: UTC+4:00

Peskovatsky (Russian: Песковатский) is a rural locality (a khutor) in Nezhinskoye Rural Settlement, Olkhovsky District, Volgograd Oblast, Russia. The population was 129 as of 2010. There are 2 streets.

== Geography ==
Peskovatsky is located in steppe, on south of the Volga Upland, 38 km northwest of Olkhovka (the district's administrative centre) by road. Nezhinsky is the nearest rural locality.
