= Nezhinsky =

Nezhinsky Нежинский
- Settlement
- Location within Volgograd Oblast Location within Russia
- Coordinates: 49°58′N 44°19′E
- Country: Russia
- Region: Volgograd Oblast
- District: Olkhovsky District
- Time zone: UTC+4:00

Nezhinsky (Russian: Нежинский) is a rural locality (a settlement) and the administrative center of Nezhinskoye Rural Settlement, Olkhovsky District, Volgograd Oblast, Russia. The population was 492 as of 2010. There are 17 streets.

== Geography ==
Nezhinsky is located 36 km northwest of Olkhovka (the district's administrative centre) by road. Peskovatsky is the nearest rural locality.
