= Rybinka, Volgograd Oblast =

Rybinka Рыбинка
- Selo
- Location within Volgograd Oblast Location within Russia
- Coordinates: 49°59′N 44°46′E
- Country: Russia
- Region: Volgograd Oblast
- District: Olkhovsky District
- Time zone: UTC+4:00

Rybinka (Russian: Рыбинка) is a rural locality (a selo) and the administrative center of Rybinskoye Rural Settlement, Olkhovsky District, Volgograd Oblast, Russia. The population was 700 as of 2010. There are 7 streets.

== Geography ==
Rybinka is located in steppe, on the Volga Upland, on the right bank of the Ilovlya River, 33 km northeast of Olkhovka (the district's administrative centre) by road. Salomatino is the nearest rural locality.
