= Razuvayev, Volgograd Oblast =

Razuvayev Разуваев
- Khutor
- Location within Volgograd Oblast Location within Russia
- Coordinates: 49°57′N 44°30′E
- Country: Russia
- Region: Volgograd Oblast
- District: Olkhovsky District
- Time zone: UTC+4:00

Razuvayev (Russian: Разуваев) is a rural locality (a khutor) in Kireyevskoye Rural Settlement, Olkhovsky District, Volgograd Oblast, Russia. The population was 79 as of 2010.

== Geography ==
Razuvayev is located in steppe, on the Olkhovka River, 16 km northwest of Olkhovka (the district's administrative centre) by road. Kireyevo is the nearest rural locality.
