= Gornovodyanoye =

Gornovodyanoye Горноводяное
- Selo
- Location within Volgograd Oblast Location within Russia
- Coordinates: 49°15′N 44°56′E
- Country: Russia
- Region: Volgograd Oblast
- District: Dubovsky District
- Time zone: UTC+4:00

Gornovodyanoye (Russian: Горноводяное) is a rural locality (a selo) and the administrative center of Gornovodyanovskoye Rural Settlement, Dubovsky District, Volgograd Oblast, Russia. The population was 723 as of 2010. There are 14 streets.

== Geography ==
Gornovodyanoye is located in steppe, on the west bank of the Volgograd Reservoir, 28 km northeast of Dubovka (the district's administrative centre) by road. Strelnoshirokoye is the nearest rural locality.
