= Mikhaylovka constituency =

Russian legislative constituency

Mikhaylovka single-member constituency
- Constituency of the Russian State Duma
- Deputy: Andrey Gimbatov; United Russia
- Federal subject: Volgograd Oblast
- Districts: Alexeyevsky, Chernyshkovsky, Kalachyovsky, Kletsky, Kotelnikovsky, Kumylzhensky, Mikhaylovka, Nekhayevsky, Novoanninsky, Novonikolayevsky, Oktyabrsky, Serafimovichsky, Surovikinsky, Svetloyarsky, Uryupinsk, Uryupinsky, Volgograd (Kirovsky, Krasnoarmeysky, Sovetsky)
- Voters: 608,559 (2026)

The Mikhaylovka constituency (No.86 (Note: No.71 in 1993-1995, No.70 in 1995-2003, No.72 in 2003-2007, No.83 in 2016–2026)) is a Russian legislative constituency in Volgograd Oblast. The constituency covers southern Volgograd and rural western Volgograd Oblast.

The constituency has been represented since 2026 by United Russia deputy Andrey Gimbatov, two-term State Duma member, who was redistricted from the eliminated Krasnoarmeysky constituency and succeeded six-term United Russia incumbent Vladimir Plotnikov after the latter successfully sought re-election on the party list.

== Boundaries ==
1993–2007: Alexeyevsky District, Danilovsky District, Frolovo, Frolovsky District, Ilovlinsky District, Kikvidzensky District, Kletsky District, Kotovsky District, Kumylzhensky District, Mikhaylovka, Mikhaylovsky District, Nekhayevsky District, Novoanninsky District, Novonikolayevsky District, Olkhovsky District, Rudnyansky District, Serafimovichsky District, Uryupinsk, Uryupinsky District, Yelansky District, Zhirnovsky District
The constituency covered rural north-central and north-western Volgograd Oblast, including the cities of Frolovo, Mikhaylovka and Uryupinsk.

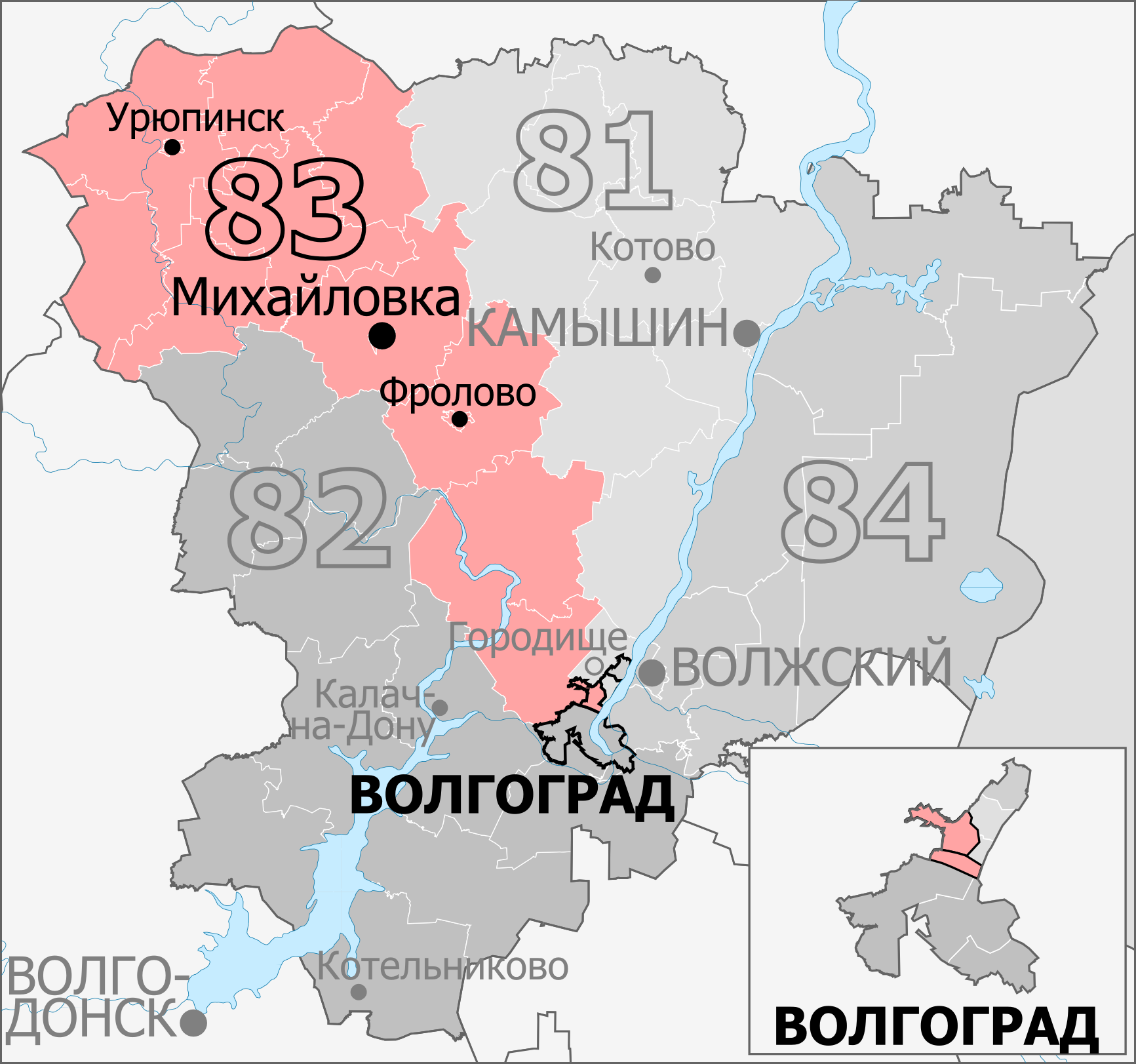
Constituency boundaries from 2016 to 2026

2016–2026: Alexeyevsky District, Frolovo, Frolovsky District, Gorodishchensky District (Grachevskoye, Karpovskoye, Kotlubanskoye, Krasnopakhorskoye, Kuzmichevskoye, Novonadezhdinskoye, Novozhiznenskoye, Novy Rogachik, Panshinskoye, Peskovatskoye, Rossoshinskoye, Samofalovskoye, Tsaritsynskoye, Vertyachinskoye), Ilovlinsky District, Kikvidzensky District, Mikhaylovka, Nekhayevsky District, Novoanninsky District, Novonikolayevsky District, Uryupinsk, Uryupinsky District, Volgograd (Voroshilovsky, Dzerzhinsky)
The constituency was re-created for the 2016 election and retained only strip of rural territories across northern Volgograd Oblast from Ilovlya to Uryupinsk, losing territories to the east to Volgograd constituency and to the west – to Krasnoarmeysky constituency. This seat instead gained most of Gorodishchensky District from Krasnoarmeysky constituency and central Volgograd from former Central constituency.

2026–present: Alexeyevsky District, Chernyshkovsky District, Kalachyovsky District, Kletsky District, Kotelnikovsky District, Kumylzhensky District, Mikhaylovka, Nekhayevsky District, Novoanninsky District, Novonikolayevsky District, Oktyabrsky District, Serafimovichsky District, Surovikinsky District, Svetloyarsky District, Uryupinsk, Uryupinsky District, Volgograd (Kirovsky, Krasnoarmeysky, Sovetsky)
After the 2025 redistricting Volgograd Oblast lost one of its four constituencies, so all remaining seats saw major changes. The constituency gained all of the dissolved Krasnoarmeysky constituency. This seat instead lost its southern half from Frolovo to central Volgograd to Volgograd constituency.

== Members elected ==
Election	Member	Party
1993	Vladimir Plotnikov	Independent
1995	Vladimir Plotnikov	Agrarian Party
1999	Vladimir Plotnikov	Independent
2003	Vladimir Plotnikov	Agrarian Party
2007	Proportional representation - no election by constituency	
2011	Proportional representation - no election by constituency	
2016	Vladimir Plotnikov	United Russia
2021	Vladimir Plotnikov	United Russia
2026	Andrey Gimbatov	United Russia

== Election results ==
=== 1993 ===
Summary of the 12 December 1993 Russian legislative election in the Mikhaylovka constituency
Candidate	Party	Votes	%
Vladimir Plotnikov	Independent	155,726	50.65%
Yevgeny Sorokin	Independent	92,463	30.07%
against all		43,056	14.00%
Total		307,453	100%

=== 1995 ===
Summary of the 17 December 1995 Russian legislative election in the Mikhaylovka constituency
Candidate	Party	Votes	%
Vladimir Plotnikov (incumbent)	Agrarian Party	172,948	49.66%
Vyacheslav Ronshin	Power to the People	61,598	17.69%
Vasily Safonov	Independent	48,978	14.06%
Vladimir Anikeyev	Yabloko	28,044	8.05%
against all		28,119	8.07%
Total		348,234	100%

=== 1999 ===
Summary of the 19 December 1999 Russian legislative election in the Mikhaylovka constituency
Candidate	Party	Votes	%
Vladimir Plotnikov (incumbent)	Independent	127,398	42.44%
Anatoly Krashchenko	Independent	74,826	24.92%
Anatoly Bykov	Independent	27,010	9.00%
Ivan Gureyev	Liberal Democratic Party	12,334	4.11%
Aleksandr Yeliseyev	Andrey Nikolayev and Svyatoslav Fyodorov Bloc	12,006	4.00%
Vyacheslav Zotin	Spiritual Heritage	8,010	2.67%
Yury Ponomarev	Russian Socialist Party	5,644	1.88%
Sergey Sheboldayev	Independent	1,538	0.51%
against all		27,537	9.17%
Total		300,208	100%

=== 2003 ===
Summary of the 7 December 2003 Russian legislative election in the Mikhaylovka constituency
Candidate	Party	Votes	%
Vladimir Plotnikov (incumbent)	Agrarian Party	140,279	54.35%
Nikolay Volkov	Union of Right Forces	60,220	23.33%
Maria Kuznetsova	United Russian Party Rus'	10,983	4.25%
Aleksandr Yeliseyev	Social Democratic Party	4,250	1.65%
Aleksandr Losev	Independent	4,224	1.64%
against all		32,526	12.60%
Total		258,253	100%

=== 2016 ===
Summary of the 18 September 2016 Russian legislative election in the Mikhaylovka constituency
Candidate	Party	Votes	%
Vladimir Plotnikov	United Russia	119,474	56.35%
Yevgeny Shamanayev	Communist Party	23,365	11.02%
Aleksey Mayboroda	Liberal Democratic Party	21,251	10.02%
Aleksey Mikheyev	A Just Russia	17,693	8.34%
Andrey Babkin	Patriots of Russia	6,721	3.17%
Andrey Proshakov	Rodina	5,015	2.37%
Sergey Bondar	The Greens	4,423	2.09%
Valery Kotelnikov	Yabloko	4,396	2.07%
Anatoly Polunin	People's Freedom Party	2,670	1.26%
Total		212,033	100%

=== 2021 ===
Summary of the 17-19 September 2021 Russian legislative election in the Mikhaylovka constituency
Candidate	Party	Votes	%
Vladimir Plotnikov (incumbent)	United Russia	168,480	55.31%
Valery Mogilny	Communist Party	59,586	19.56%
Aleksey Loginov	Liberal Democratic Party	21,094	6.92%
Aleksey Ushakov	New People	16,048	5.27%
Shakhbaz Davidov	A Just Russia — For Truth	14,501	4.76%
Aleksey Isayev	Party of Pensioners	13,175	4.32%
Aleksey Zverev	Party of Growth	6,304	2.07%
Total		304,629	100%

=== 2026 ===
Summary of the 18-20 September 2026 Russian legislative election in the Mikhaylovka constituency
Candidate	Party	Votes	%
Andrey Gimbatov (incumbent) (Note: redistricted from Krasnoarmeysky constituency)	United Russia	217,351	52.11%
Valery Mogilny	Communist Party	81,840	19.62%
Samvel Avetisyan	New People	41,027	9.84%
Yevgeny Karelikov	Party of Pensioners	29,686	7.12%
Aleksey Kononenko	Liberal Democratic Party	26,783	6.42%
Vitaly Baranov	A Just Russia	17,018	4.08%
Total		417,080	100%
