= Varkino =

Varkino Варькино
- Selo
- Location within Volgograd Oblast Location within Russia
- Coordinates: 49°41′N 45°04′E
- Country: Russia
- Region: Volgograd Oblast
- District: Dubovsky District
- Time zone: UTC+4:00

Varkino (Russian: Варькино) is a rural locality (a selo) in Gornobalykleyskoye Rural Settlement, Dubovsky District, Volgograd Oblast, Russia. The population was 150 as of 2010. There are 5 streets.

== Geography ==
Varkino is located in steppe, on the Balykleyka River, 88 km north of Dubovka (the district's administrative centre) by road. Romanovka is the nearest rural locality.
