= Sadki, Dubovsky District, Volgograd Oblast =

Sadki Садки
- Selo
- Location within Volgograd Oblast Location within Russia
- Coordinates: 49°10′N 44°25′E
- Country: Russia
- Region: Volgograd Oblast
- District: Dubovsky District
- Time zone: UTC+4:00

Sadki (Russian: Садки) is a rural locality (a selo) in Loznovskoye Rural Settlement, Dubovsky District, Volgograd Oblast, Russia. The population was 303 as of 2010. There are 10 streets.

== Geography ==
Sadki is located 34 km from Volga River, 49 km northwest of Dubovka (the district's administrative centre) by road. Spartak is the nearest rural locality.
