= Goskonyushnya =

Goskonyushnya Госконюшня
- Settlement
- Location within Volgograd Oblast Location within Russia
- Coordinates: 49°47′N 44°25′E
- Country: Russia
- Region: Volgograd Oblast
- District: Olkhovsky District
- Time zone: UTC+4:00

Goskonyushnya (Russian: Госконюшня) is a rural locality (a settlement) in Kamennobrodskoye Rural Settlement, Olkhovsky District, Volgograd Oblast, Russia. The population was 12 as of 2010.

== Geography ==
Goskonyushnya is located in the valley of the Ilovlya River, 16 km southwest of Olkhovka (the district's administrative centre) by road. Mikhaylovka is the nearest rural locality.
