= Karavayinka =

Karavayinka Караваинка
- Selo
- Location within Volgograd Oblast Location within Russia
- Coordinates: 49°43′N 45°13′E
- Country: Russia
- Region: Volgograd Oblast
- District: Dubovsky District
- Time zone: UTC+4:00

Karavayinka (Russian: Караваинка) is a rural locality (a selo) in Gornobalykleyskoye Rural Settlement, Dubovsky District, Volgograd Oblast, Russia. The population was 102 as of 2010. There are 11 streets.

== Geography ==
Karavayinka is located in steppe, on the west bank of the Volgograd Reservoir, 93 km northeast of Dubovka (the district's administrative centre) by road. Studenovka is the nearest rural locality.
