= Gornaya Proleyka =

Gornaya Proleyka Горная Пролейка
- Selo
- Location within Volgograd Oblast Location within Russia
- Coordinates: 49°22′N 44°59′E
- Country: Russia
- Region: Volgograd Oblast
- District: Dubovsky District
- Time zone: UTC+4:00

Gornaya Proleyka (Russian: Горная Пролейка) is a rural locality (a selo) and the administrative center of Gornoproleyskoye Rural Settlement, Dubovsky District, Volgograd Oblast, Russia. The population was 1,310 as of 2010. There are 33 streets.

== Geography ==
Gornaya Proleyka is located in steppe, on the west bank of the Volgograd Reservoir, 53 km north of Dubovka (the district's administrative centre) by road. Strelnoshirokoye is the nearest rural locality.
