= Shchepkin, Volgograd Oblast =

Shchepkin Щепкин
- Khutor
- Location within Volgograd Oblast Location within Russia
- Coordinates: 49°43′N 44°58′E
- Country: Russia
- Region: Volgograd Oblast
- District: Olkhovsky District
- Time zone: UTC+4:00

Shchepkin (Russian: Щепкин) is a rural locality (a khutor) in Lipovskoye Rural Settlement, Olkhovsky District, Volgograd Oblast, Russia. The population was 19 as of 2010.

== Geography ==
Shchepkin is located in steppe, on the Volga Upland, on the left bank of the Golaya River, 5 km south of Olkhovka (the district's administrative centre) by road. Zenzevatka is the nearest rural locality.
