= Suvodskaya =

Suvodskaya Суводская
- Stanitsa
- Location within Volgograd Oblast Location within Russia
- Coordinates: 49°29′N 45°03′E
- Country: Russia
- Region: Volgograd Oblast
- District: Dubovsky District
- Time zone: UTC+4:00

Suvodskaya (Russian: Суводская) is a rural locality (a stanitsa) and the administrative center of Suvodskoye Rural Settlement, Dubovsky District, Volgograd Oblast, Russia. The population was 450 as of 2010. There are 11 streets.

== Geography ==
Suvodskaya is located on the right bank of Volga, 63 km northeast of Dubovka (the district's administrative centre) by road. Rasstrigin is the nearest rural locality.
