= Zenzevatka =

Zenzevatka Зензеватка
- Selo
- Location within Volgograd Oblast Location within Russia
- Coordinates: 49°48′N 44°32′E
- Country: Russia
- Region: Volgograd Oblast
- District: Olkhovsky District
- Time zone: UTC+4:00

Zenzevatka (Russian: Зензева́тка) is a rural locality (a selo) and the administrative center of Zenzevatvskoye Rural Settlement, Olkhovsky District, Volgograd Oblast, Russia. The population was 1,604 as of 2017. There are 14 streets.

== History ==
According to the Historical and Geographical Dictionary of Saratov Province, it was settled by Russian serfs in the 1770s or in the early 19th century.

== Geography ==
Zenzevatka is located 8 km southwest of Olkhovka (the district's administrative centre) by road. Olkhovka is the nearest rural locality.
