= Kosykh =

Kosykh (Russian: Косых) is a Russian surname. Notable people with the surname include:

- Grigory Kosykh (1934–2012), Soviet sports shooter and Olympic medalist
- Viktor Kosykh (1950–2011), Soviet and Russian actor
- Vladimir Kosykh (1950–2025), Russian politician
