= Alexey Volotskov =

Russian politician

- Алексей Волоцков
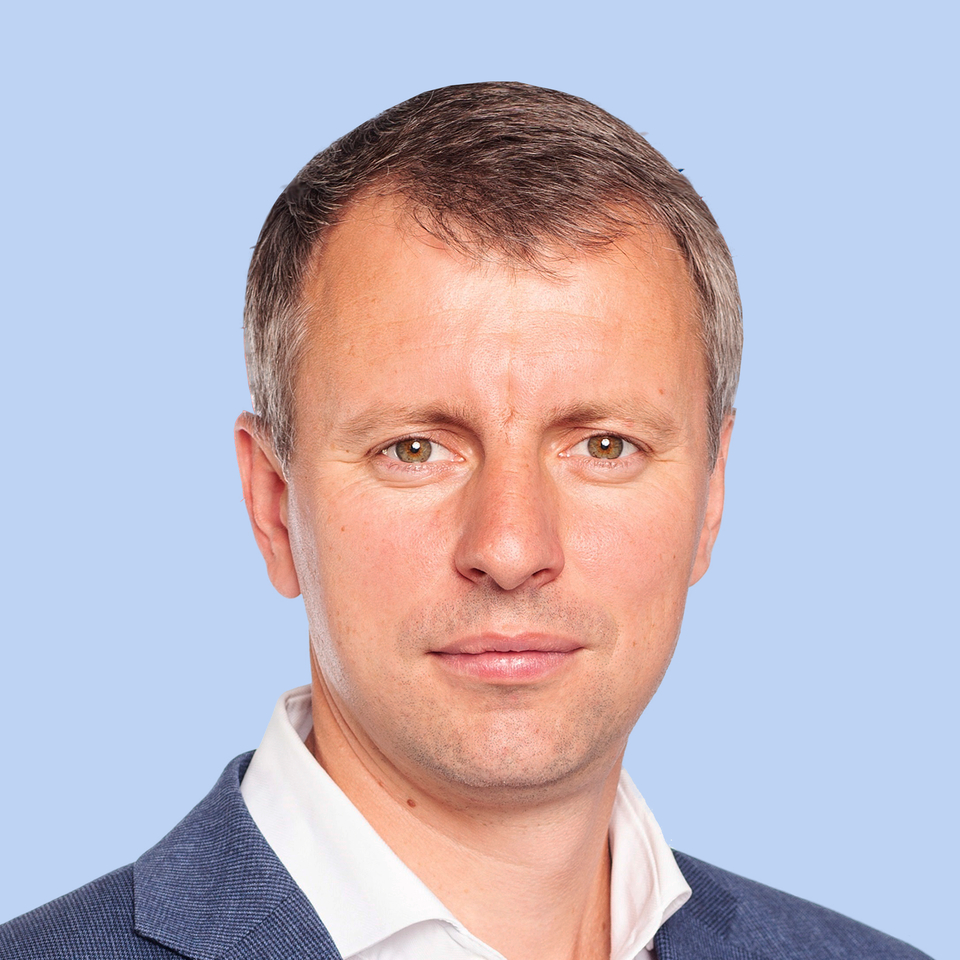

Member of the State Duma for Volgograd Oblast
- Incumbent
- Assumed office 12 October 2021
- Preceded by: Anna Kuvychko
- Constituency: Volgograd (No. 81)

Personal details
- Born: 5 July 1981 (age 45) Krasnoslobodsk, Volgograd Oblast, Russian SFSR, USSR
- Party: United Russia
- Children: 2
- Education: Volgograd State University of Architecture and Civil Engineering; RANEPA

Alexey Anatolievich Volotskov (Russian: Алексей Анатольевич Волоцков; born 5 July 1981, Krasnoslobodsk, Volgograd Oblast) is a Russian political figure and a deputy of the 8th State Duma.

From 2001 to 2003, Volotskov was the head of the regional branch of the Young Guard of United Russia. From 2006 to 2011, he was a member of the Youth Parliament of the Volgograd Oblast. From 2008 to 2019, he was the deputy of the Volgograd City Duma of the 4th, 5th, and 6th convocations. From 2009 to 2014, he was also the chairman of the Council of Young Deputies of the Volgograd Oblast. In 2015–2018, Volotskov served as the Deputy Head of Volgograd. From 2019 to 2021, he was the deputy of the Volgograd Oblast Duma of the 6th convocation. Since September 2021, he has served as deputy of the 8th State Duma.

== Sanctions ==
In December 2022 the EU sanctioned Alexey Volotskov in relation to the 2022 Russian invasion of Ukraine.
