= Roman Grebennikov =

Russian political figure (born 1975)

- Роман Гребенников
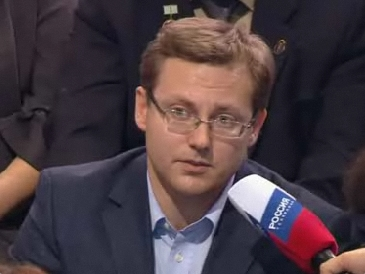
- Grebennikov in 2008

Mayor of Volgograd
- In office 20 May 2007 – 24 February 2011
- Preceded by: Yevgeny Ishchenko
- Succeeded by: Valery Vasilkov

Chairman of the Volgograd Oblast Duma
- In office 5 April 2001 – 21 April 2005
- Preceded by: Viktor Pripisnov
- Succeeded by: Vitaly Likhachyov

Personal details
- Born: 25 August 1975 (age 51) Volgograd, Soviet Union
- Party: Communist Party (1998–2008); United Russia (2008–2011; 2013–)
- Education: Volgograd State University

Roman Georgiyevich Grebennikov (Russian: Роман Георгиевич Гребенников; born 25 August 1975) is a Russian political figure and former Mayor of Volgograd. He was elected Mayor of Volgograd in 2007.

== Biography ==
Grebennikov graduated from law school at Volgograd State University in 1998. After graduation, he worked as the head of a law firm. Grebennikov joined the Volgograd branch of the Communist Party of the Russian Federation with the nomination of his candidacy for deputy, supported by Alevtina Aparina. In 1998 and again in 2001, he was elected to the Volgograd Oblast Duma. From 2001 to 2005, he was chairman of the Volgograd Oblast Duma, becoming the youngest head of the legislative body in its history. In 2003, he moved to the Committee on Social Policy.

On 21 May 2007, Grebennikov was elected Mayor of Volgograd with 32.47% of the vote. He is the youngest mayor of a regional capital.

On 24 February 2011, Grebennikov was removed from his post of mayor of Volgograd after it was claimed he had several disputes with the governor of the province where his city is located.
