= Vladimir Plotnikov (politician) =

Russian politician (born 1961)

- Владимир Плотников
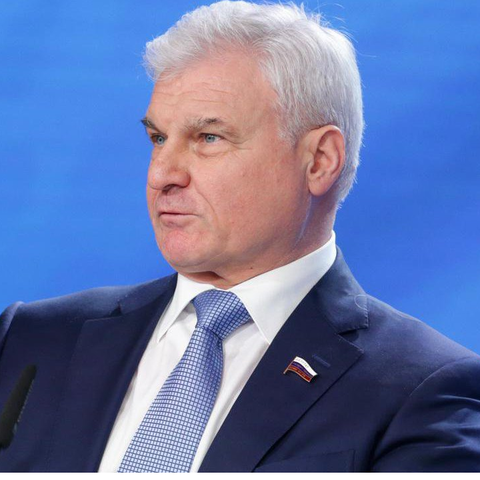

Member of the State Duma for Volgograd Oblast
- Incumbent
- Assumed office 5 October 2016
- Preceded by: constituency re-established
- In office 11 January 1994 – 24 December 2007
- Preceded by: constituency established
- Succeeded by: constituencies abolished
- Constituency: Mikhaylovka (No. 83)

Senator from Volgograd Oblast
- In office 25 March 2009 – 25 September 2014

Personal details
- Born: 6 November 1961 (age 64) Gusyovka, Olkhovsky District, Stalingrad Oblast, Russian SFSR, USSR
- Party: United Russia (from 2008); APR (until 2008); CPSU (until 1991)
- Children: 2
- Education: Volgograd State Agricultural University; MFA Diplomatic Academy
- Occupation: Agronomist

Vladimir Nikolayevich Plotnikov (Russian: Владимир Николаевич Плотников; born 6 November 1961, Gusyovka, Olkhovsky District) is a Russian political figure and a deputy of the 1st, 2nd, 3rd, 4th, 7th, and 8th State Dumas.

In 1995, Plotnikov was granted a Candidate of Sciences degree in Agricultural Sciences. From 1984 to 1993, he worked as a chief agronomer of the Olkhovsky District. In 1993-2007, he was the deputy of the State Duma of the 1st, 2nd, 3rd, 4th convocations.

Initially, Plotnikov was a member of the Agrarian Party of Russia, but in October 2008, he joined the United Russia instead. From April 2004 to 2008 he served as chairman of the Agrarian Party after Mikhail Lapshin stepped down.

On 1 March 2009 he was elected deputy of the Volgograd Oblast Duma. In 2009-2014, Plotnkov was a member of the Federation Council. In 2016 and 2021, he was re-elected for the 7th and 8th State Dumas respectively.

== Sanctions ==
He was sanctioned by the UK government in 2022 in relation to the Russo-Ukrainian War.
