= Vladimir Plotnikov =

Vladimir Plotnikov may refer to:

- Vladimir Plotnikov (politician) (born 1961), Russian politician
- Vladimir Plotnikov (footballer) (born 1986), Kazakhstani footballer
- Vladimir Plotnikov (scientist) (1873—1947), Soviet scientist
- Vladimir Plotnikov (senator) (born 1932), Russian politician, member of the Federation Council
- Vladimir Plotnikov (diplomat) (born 1943), Russian diplomat
