= Gusyovka =

Gusyovka Гусёвка
- Selo
- Location within Volgograd Oblast Location within Russia
- Coordinates: 49°54′N 44°41′E
- Country: Russia
- Region: Volgograd Oblast
- District: Olkhovsky District
- Time zone: UTC+4:00

Gusyovka (Russian: Гусёвка) is a rural locality (a selo) and the administrative center of Gusyovskoye Rural Settlement, Olkhovsky District, Volgograd Oblast, Russia. The population was 1,262 as of 2010. There are 17 streets.

== Geography ==
Gusyovka is located 23 km northwest of Olkhovka (the district's administrative centre) by road. Zaburunny is the nearest rural locality.
