= 2007 Volgograd mayoral election =

2007 Volgograd early head election
← 2003	20 May 2007	2012 →
- Turnout: 38.41%
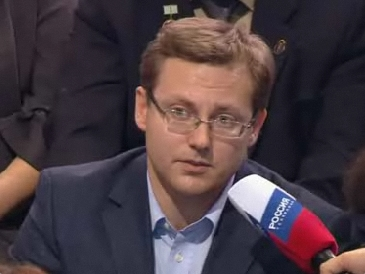
Candidate	Roman Grebennikov	Roland Kherianov
Party	CPRF	Independent
Popular vote	96,006	70,536
Percentage	32.47%	23.85%
Candidate	Valisy Galushkin	Dmitry Krylov
Party	United Russia	Independent
Popular vote	60,162	16,507
Percentage	20.35%	5.58%
Head before election
Evgeny Ishchenko
United Russia
Elected Head
Roman Grebennikov
CPRF

Volgograd, Russia, held a mayoral election on May 20, 2007. Roman Grebennikov of the Communist Party of the Russian Federation won the election.

== Candidates ==
- Roman Grebennikov, KPRF
- Roland Kherianov,
- Vasili Galushkin, United Russia
- Dmitri Krylov, independent

== Results ==
Mayoral election 2007: Volgograd
Party	Candidate	Votes	%	±%
CPRF	Roman Grebennikov		32.47%	
	Roland Kherianov		23.85%	
United Russia	Vasili Galushkin		20.35%	
independent	Dmitri Krylov		5.58%	
-	Others		~5%	
Turnout				
