= Dubovka, Kamyshinsky District, Volgograd Oblast =

Dubovka Дубовка
- Khutor
- Location within Volgograd Oblast Location within Russia
- Coordinates: 50°14′N 45°33′E
- Country: Russia
- Region: Volgograd Oblast
- District: Kamyshinsky District
- Time zone: UTC+4:00

Dubovka (Russian: Дубовка) is a rural locality (a khutor) in Ternovskoye Rural Settlement, Kamyshinsky District, Volgograd Oblast, Russia. The population was 278 as of 2010. There are 5 streets.

== Geography ==
Dubovka is located in forest steppe, on the Volga Upland, on the west bank of the Volgograd Reservoir, 25 km northeast of Kamyshin (the district's administrative centre) by road. Ternovka is the nearest rural locality.
