= Dubovka, Republic of Bashkortostan =

Dubovka Дубовка
- Village
- Location within Bashkortostan Location within Russia
- Coordinates: 56°12′N 56°04′E
- Country: Russia
- Region: Bashkortostan
- District: Tatyshlinsky District
- Time zone: UTC+5:00

Dubovka (Russian: Дубовка) is a rural locality (a village) in Nizhnebaltachevsky Selsoviet, Tatyshlinsky District, Bashkortostan, Russia. The population was 31 as of 2010. There is 1 street.

== Geography ==
Dubovka is located 20 km southeast of Verkhniye Tatyshly (the district's administrative centre) by road. Verkhnebaltachevo is the nearest rural locality.
