= Andrey Gimbatov =

Russian politician (born 1979)

- Андрей Гимбатов
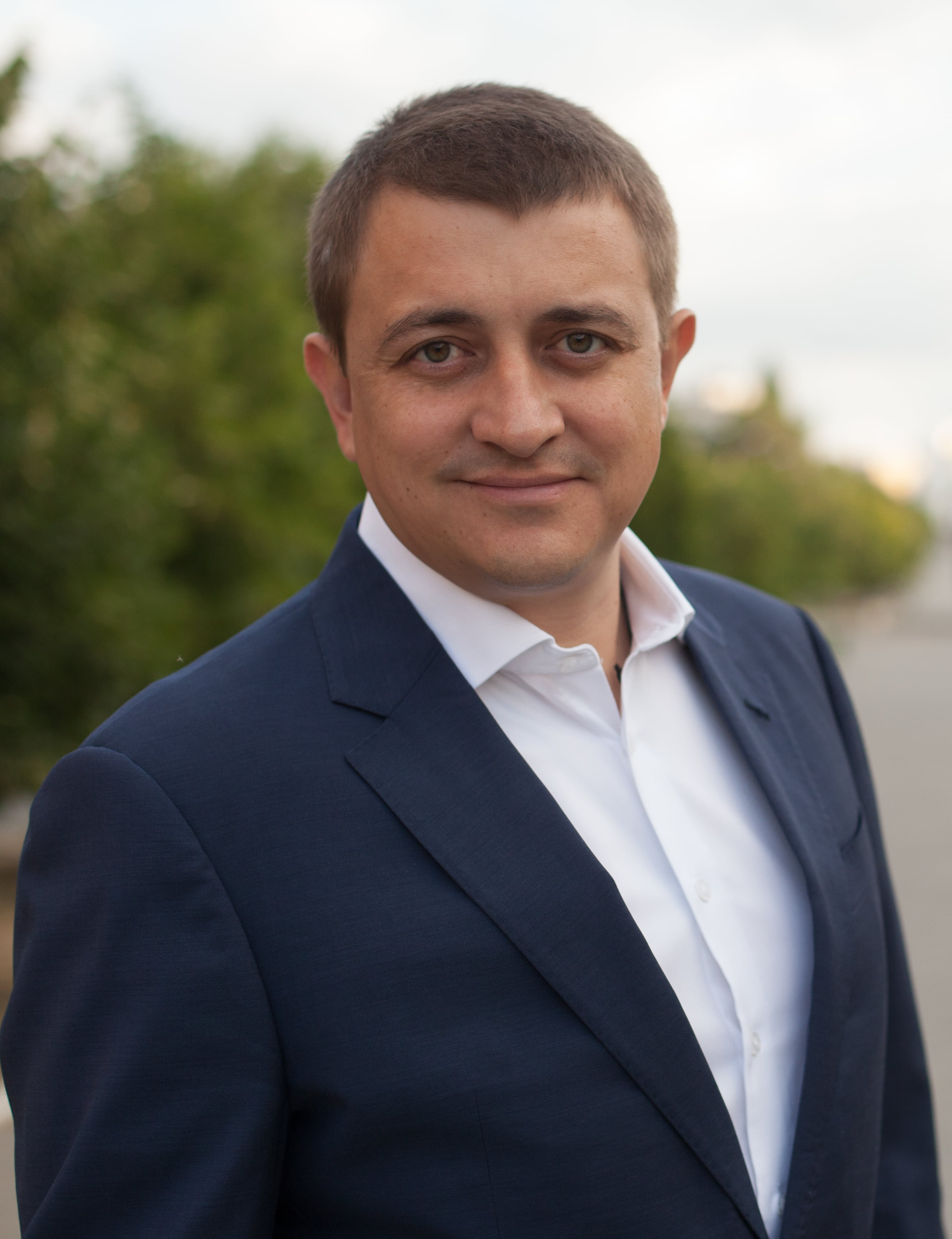

Member of the State Duma for Volgograd Oblast
- Incumbent
- Assumed office 12 October 2021
- Preceded by: Tatyana Tsybizova
- Constituency: Krasnoarmeysky (No. 82)

Personal details
- Born: 19 July 1979 (age 47) Volgograd, RSFSR, USSR
- Party: United Russia
- Spouse: Natalia Kiselyova
- Children: 4
- Parents: Peter Dmitrievich Gimbatov (father); Tatiana Vladimirovna Shevchenko (mother)
- Relatives: Vladimir Illarionovich Shevchenko (grandfather)
- Education: Volgograd State University

Andrey Petrovich Gimbatov (Russian: Андрей Петрович Гимбатов; born 19 July 1979, Volgograd) is a Russian political figure and a deputy of the 8th State Duma.

Gimbatov started his political career in 2007 when he was appointed the Deputy Chairman of the Land Resources Committee of the Volgograd Administration. Afterwards, he served as the head of the Volgograd Research Institute of Mechanical Engineering Technology. From 2016 to 2021, he was a deputy of the Volgograd Regional Duma. In 2019–2021, he was the first vice-chairman of the Volgograd Regional Duma. Since September 2021, he has served as a deputy of the 8th State Duma from the Volgograd Oblast constituency.

== Sanctions ==
He was sanctioned by the UK government in 2022 in relation to the Russo-Ukrainian War.
