= Vitaly Likhachyov =

Russian politician

- Виталий Лихачёв
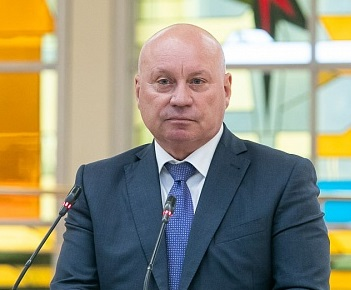

Member of the State Duma
- Incumbent
- Assumed office 12 October 2021

Mayor of Volgograd
- In office 19 September 2018 – 27 September 2021
- Preceded by: Andrey Kosolapov

Chairman of the Volgograd Oblast Duma (acting)
- In office 1 September 2010 – 23 September 2010
- Preceded by: Vladimir Kabanov
- Succeeded by: Vladimir Yefimov

4th Chairman of the Volgograd Oblast Duma
- In office 26 April 2005 – 17 March 2009
- Preceded by: Roman Grebennikov
- Succeeded by: Vladimir Kabanov

Personal details
- Born: Vitaly Viktorovich Likhachyov; 22 February 1964 (age 62) Volgograd, Soviet Union
- Party: United Russia
- Spouse: Lyudmila Likhachyova
- Children: Aleksander; Tatyana

Vitaly Viktorovich Likhachyov (Russian: Виталий Викторович Лихачёв born on 22 February 1964), is a Russian politician, who is currently a member of the State Duma of the VIII convocation. He had served as the mayor of Volgograd from 2018 to 2021, and had been a member of the Volgograd Oblast Duma of the third and fourth convocations, and was its chairman from 2005 to 2009.

== Biography ==
Vitaly Likhachyov was born on 22 February 1964 in Volgograd.

He graduated from the Faculty of Electrification of the Volgograd Agricultural Institute in 1986 with a degree in electrification of agriculture (qualification - "engineer") and the Faculty of Economics of the Volgograd State Academy of Architecture and Civil Engineering in 1999 with a degree in Economics and Management at Enterprises in Construction (qualification - "economist").

In 1995, he was appointed executive director of OAO Khlebokombinat Volzhsky. In 1997, by decision of the meeting of shareholders, he was elected the general director of this enterprise. With the participation of the former head of Volgograd, Yury Chekhov, in 2003, he created the Volga Agro-Industrial Company.

=== As the Chairman of the Volgograd Oblast Duma ===
In December 2003, Likhachyov was elected a deputy of the Volgograd Oblast Duma of the III convocation, was a vice-speaker.

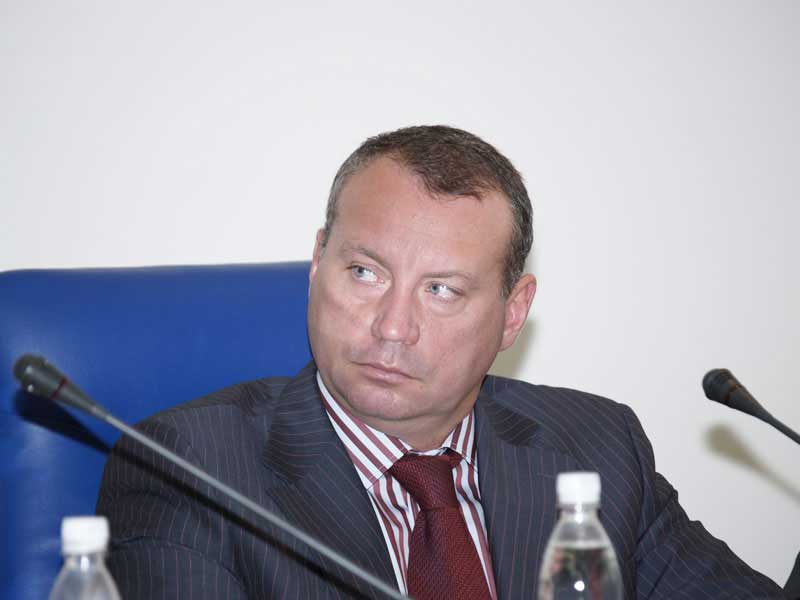
Likhachyov as a member of the Volgograd Oblast Duma (2003-2005)

On 21 April 2005, the regional Duma, at the initiative of the United Russia factions, the Liberal Democratic Party of Russia, and a number of independent deputies, decided to remove Roman Grebennikov from the post of chairman of the Duma; the motive was allegedly lobbying the interests of the Communist Party. To this end, the rules of the Duma were changed in advance - the number of votes required to make such a decision was reduced from two-thirds to a simple majority. The Central District and Volgograd Regional Courts dismissed Grebennikov's complaint, which challenged that decision; however, on December 2, the presidium of the regional court ruled that the Duma's decision was illegal. As a result, on 8 December 2005, 25 deputies out of 26 present voted for the dismissal of Roman Grebennikov from the post of chairman of the Duma retroactively. On 26 April 2005, Likhachyov was elected speaker. He retained the position of the chairman until the next elections in 2009.

On 15 September 2006, on the recommendation of the General Council of the All-Russian political party "United Russia", he was elected Secretary of the Volgograd regional branch. He headed the regional branch from 2006 to 2009.

In the Volgograd Oblast Duma of the 4th convocation, Likhachyov was elected First Deputy Chairman of the Volgograd Regional Duma.

On 1 September 2010, after the departure of Vladimir Kabanov, he was the acting chairman of the Duma. On 23 September 2010, Vladimir Yefimov was elected Chairman of the Duma.

=== As Vice Governor of Volgograd Oblast ===
Likhachyov had been the vice-governor of the Volgograd Oblast and the head of the governor's office.

=== As Mayor of Volgograd ===
Likhachyov became the acting head of administration of Volgograd (the so-called "city manager") from 29 June 2016, after the resignation of Aleksander Chunakov.

On 22 July 2016, he was elected to the post of head of administration of Volgograd.

In March 2017, Alexei Navalny visited Volgograd as part of his presidential campaign. The opening of the election headquarters was marked by a brawl, which, according to Navalny himself, was led on the spot by Likhachyov. A number of experts support this view. Likhachyov himself did not comment on this statement.

On 15 April 2017, the trolleybus route No. 18 stopped working, which caused discontent among the residents of the Kirovsky district.

In the summer of 2017, in preparation for the 2018 FIFA World Cup, the city authorities cut down the "Widows' Park" at the foot of Mamaev Kurgan to build a car parking lot. The park was founded by the townspeople in 1965, when residents began to plant trees in memory of their relatives who died in the Battle of Stalingrad. The situation received wide publicity at the federal level. At the same time, the city authorities denied the existence of the park.

According to political scientist Andrey Serenko, "working as a" city manager "of Volgograd seriously changed Likhachev - at least his public behavior. Until recently, the talkative leader of the local United Russia and the speaker of the regional legislature, who did not go into his pocket for a word, was a favorite of journalists. However, for a year now, Likhachev has been leading the life of a recluse and a silent man - neither the media nor the townspeople see or hear him. Sometimes the existence of a "city manager" in the regional center can only be guessed by some secondary information signs. And in this silence, if you wish, you can also consider the tragic image of Likhachyov, from which he either does not want, or cannot get out.".

In the fall of 2017, changes were made to the city charter that abolished the separate position of the head of administration. Previously, deputies of the city duma elected the head of Volgograd from among the deputies themselves, while the position of head of the city was combined with the position of chairman of the city duma, as both posts were held by Andrey Kosolapov. After the elections to the City Duma held on September 9, 2018, the competition commission nominated four applicants for the post of the head of the city, who were pre-selected by the commission based on applications submitted by residents of the city. On 19 September 2018, the Volgograd City Duma elected Likhachyov as the head of Volgograd.

In April 2019, Channel One aired a story about the problems with garbage dumps around Volgograd, and the local authorities cannot do anything about it. Mountains of rubbish were located in the immediate vicinity of the Bald Mountain federal monument. Subsequently, the prosecutor's office repeatedly revealed violations in terms of unauthorized dumps, and in September 2020, a proposal was submitted to the mayor Likhachyov, to eliminate violations of the law. At the suits of the prosecutor's office, the court made decisions on the liquidation of the dumps. Some decisions were later reversed.

In 2020, a prosecutor's check found that the city administration illegally issued a permit for the construction of a food court in the center of Volgograd. The owner of the building was the wife of the chairman of the Volgograd City Duma, Vladlen Kolesnikov. The administration did not take any measures in this regard, after which the prosecutor's office went to court demanding the demolition of the building.

On 1 July 2020, tram route No. 1 was closed, which caused discontent among the residents of the city, who turned to the prosecutor's office with a complaint about the actions of officials. According to the results of the prosecutor's check, the administration was required to restore the movement of trams on the route. On 14 December 2020, the route resumed its operation.

In November 2020, Ilya Varlamov drew attention to the investigation prepared by the Volgograd headquarters of Navalny on public procurement of playgrounds by the city administration. In their opinion, with which Varlamov agreed, the terms of reference for the procurement were written in such a way as to ensure the victory of a particular participant: "In the last three years alone, this corruption cartel throughout the city has divided among themselves about 68 million rubles. In these purchases, the authorized body indicates the administration of Volgograd. <…> contracts are often concluded with a single supplier at inflated prices.".

On 30 April 2021, a minibus with a children's basketball team from Volgograd had an accident, resulting, 5 children dead, 6 children and 1 adult were seriously injured. Based on the results of the inspection, the prosecutor's office made a submission to Likhachyov. The department demanded that he take measures to eliminate violations of the law and take additional measures to ensure safety in organizing the transportation of children.

In the spring of 2021, it became known about the plans of the Volgograd administration to change the security zones of the ensemble on Mamaev Kurgan in order to allow high-rise buildings in the surrounding area. The administration denied these plans. At the same time, the administration of the region confirmed that the project for changing the buffer zones exists. Later, the Ministry of Culture of Russia approved a project to change the buffer zones and develop the territory adjacent to Mamayev Kurgan.

Political scientist Vitaly Arkov also drew attention to the non-publicity of formerly one of the most prominent media characters of the local political beau monde. At the same time, he noted that Vitaly Likhachev is one of those "who have the skills that are in demand in the modern political system to survive under any leader. One got the impression that the city was headed by the governor Andrey Bocharov.

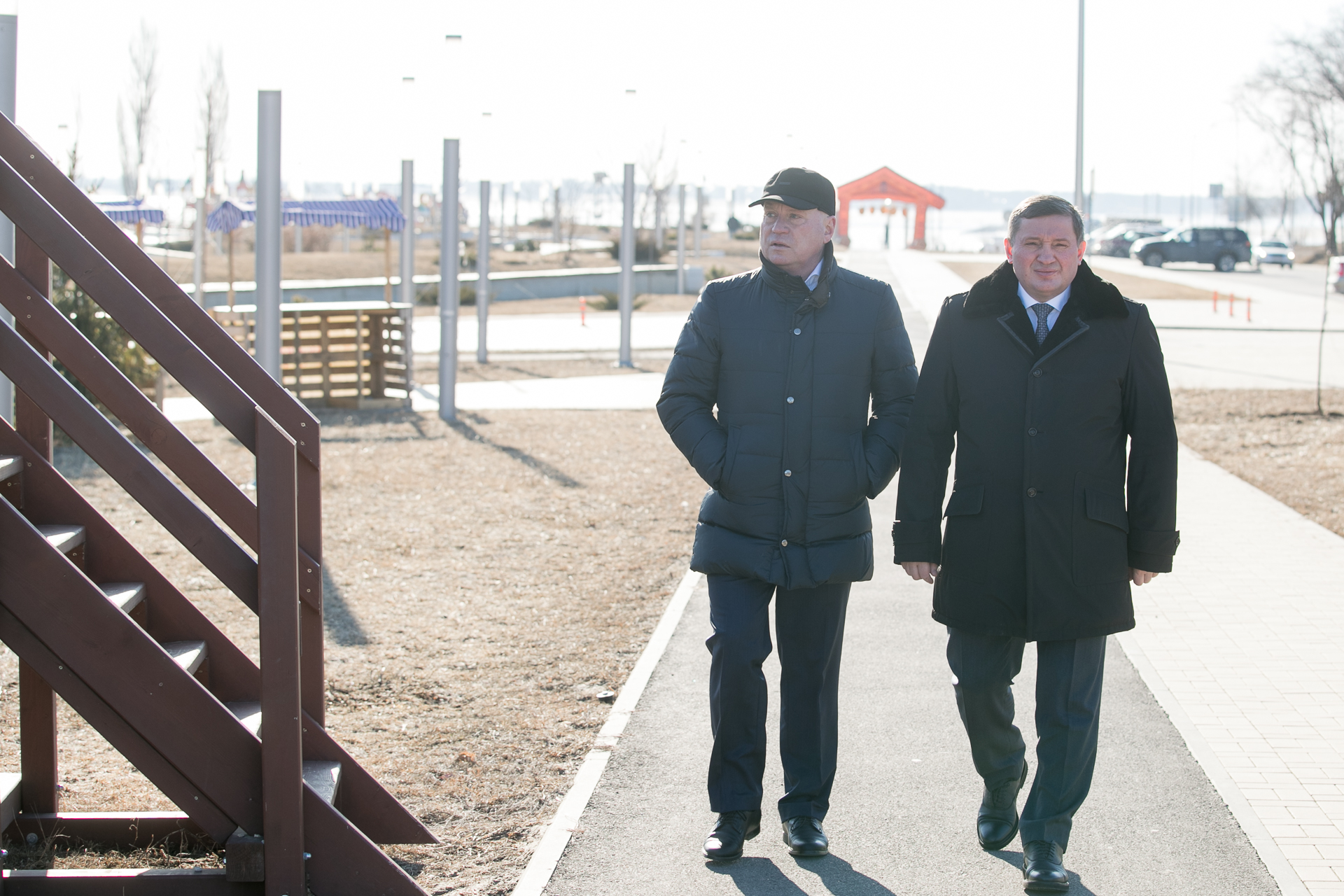
Likhachyov with Andrey Bocharov in March 2021

The former head of Volgograd, Grebennikov, did not see the positive results of Likhachyov's activities in his post, especially noting "the destruction of the tram fleet and the reduction of the trolleybus fleet." Political scientist and member of the regional headquarters of the ONF Konstantin Glushenok described Likhachev as "the walking shadow of Governor Andrey Bocharov", while not showing any activity even in those issues that were within the direct competence of the head of Volgograd.

=== As a Member of the State Duma ===
In the 2021 State Duma elections, he was one of the three United Russia candidates from the Volgograd Region. After Governor Bocharov, who headed the list, refused the mandate, Likhachyov got the opportunity to become a deputy of the State Duma of the VIII convocation.

He was known, as a member of parliament, for not voting for a bill on exemption from payment for housing and utilities for veterans of the Great Patriotic War.

On 24 March 2022, the United States Treasury sanctioned him in response to the 2022 Russian invasion of Ukraine.

== Family ==
He is married to his wife, Lyudmila, has two children: son, Aleksandr, and daughter, Tatyana.

Aleskandr is one of the 50 richest entrepreneurs in the Volgograd Oblast, while Tatyana studied in the United Kingdom and lives in London.

From 2007 to 2017, the Likhachyov family were the founders of a company registered in the Czech Republic. In 2008, Lyudmila became the founder of another company in the Czech Republic.
