= Raygorod, Volgograd Oblast =

Raygorod Райгород
- Khutor
- Location within Volgograd Oblast Location within Russia
- Coordinates: 48°25′N 44°55′E
- Country: Russia
- Region: Volgograd Oblast
- District: Svetloyarsky District
- Time zone: UTC+4:00

Raygorod (Russian: Райгород) is a rural locality (a khutor) in Svetloyarsky District, Volgograd Oblast, Russia. The population was 2,848 as of 2010. There are 45 streets.

== Geography ==
Raygorod is located 15 km northwest of Svetly Yar (the district's administrative centre) by road. Svetly Yar is the nearest rural locality.
