= Oleg Savchenko (politician, born 1966) =

Russian politician

- Олег Савченко
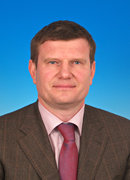

Member of the State Duma for Volgograd Oblast
- In office 12 October 2021 – 20 May 2025
- Preceded by: Irina Guseva
- Constituency: Volzhsky (No. 84)

Member of the State Duma (Party List Seat)
- In office 29 December 2003 – 5 October 2016

Personal details
- Born: 25 October 1966 (age 59) Leningrad, RSFSR, USSR
- Party: United Russia
- Education: Moscow Aviation Institute

Oleg Vladimirovich Savchenko (Russian: Олег Владимирович Савченко; October 25, 1966, in Saryg-Sep, Kaa-Khemsky District) is a Russian political figure and deputy of the 4th, 5th, 6th, and 8th State Dumas.

After graduating from the university, Savchenko worked at the Moscow Radio Engineering Plant. In 1996, he was appointed director of the gold mining enterprise at the Mayskoye deposit in the Chukotka Autonomous Okrug. From 1998 to 2000, he was an assistant to a member of the Federation Council. Since 2003, he was elected deputy of the 4th, 5th, and 6th State Dumas. Since September 2021, he has served as deputy of the 8th State Duma.

In 2021, Savchenko became 22nd in the Forbes ranking of the wealthiest civil servants in Russia.

== Sanctions ==
He was sanctioned by the UK government in 2022 in relation to the Russo-Ukrainian War.

In March 2022, Italian authorities, as a reaction to 2022 Russian invasion of Ukraine, confiscated Savchenko's villa in Tuscany.
