= Alevtina Aparina =

Russian politician (1941–2013)

- Алевтина Викторовна Апарина
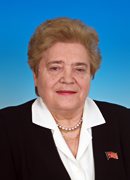

Personal details
- Born: 20 April 1941 Stalingrad, Soviet Union
- Died: 29 December 2013 (aged 72) Volgograd, Russia
- Education: Rostov State University
- Occupation: Politician

Alevtina Viktorovna Aparina (Russian: Алевтина Викторовна Апарина; 20 April 1941 – 29 December 2013) was a Russian politician and member of the State Duma of the Russian Federation.

== Biography ==
Aparina was born in Stalingrad on 20 April 1941. She graduated from Rostov State University in 1967. Alevtina Aparina studied philology at the university. In 1986 she graduated by correspondence from the Saratov Higher Party School. She began to work as a common worker in a sovkhoz. Aparina also worked as an accountant, a cattleman, pig-tender, and a poultry woman. Between 1965 and 1967 she was employed at middle school as Russian teacher. Aparina had been elected as a deputy of the State Duma's fourth convocation on 7 December 2003. On 22 June 2012 she retired as general secretary of the Volgograd's Communist Party of the Russian Federation branch. She died from a grave illness in Volgograd (former Stalingrad) on 29 December 2013.
