= Vladimir Kosykh =

Russian politician (1950–2025)

- Владимир Косых
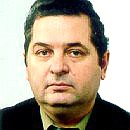
- Kosykh in 1993

Deputy of the 1st State Duma
- In office 12 December 1993 – 16 December 1995

Personal details
- Born: 23 May 1950 Gryazi, Lipetsk Oblast, Russian SFSR, USSR
- Died: 1 January 2025 (aged 74) Volgograd, Volgograd Oblast, Russia

Vladimir Ivanovich Kosykh (Russian: Владимир Иванович Косых; 23 May 1950 – 1 January 2025) was a Russian politician who was a deputy of the 1st State Duma (1993–1995).

Kosykh died on 1 January 2025, at the age of 74.
