= Volgograd State University of Architecture and Civil Engineering =

- VSUACE
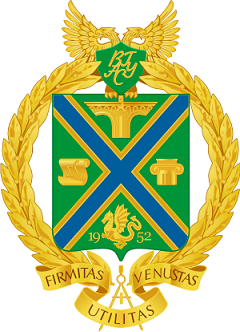
- Type: Public
- Established: December 1951
- Rector: S. Y. Kalashnikov
- Russian name: Волгоградский государственный архитектурно-строительный университет (ВолгГАСУ)
- Location: Volgograd, Volgograd Oblast, Russia; 48°41′36″N 44°29′50″E
- Campus: Urban
- Address: 400074, Volgograd, Akademicheskaya St., 1
- Nickname: GorHoz
- Website: http://en.vgasu.ru/

The Volgograd State University of Architecture and Civil Engineering is one of the major Universities in Volgograd (formerly Stalingrad). It was founded in December 1951 and gained university status on December 29, 2003. Previous names were:

- Stalingrad Institute of Engineers of Municipal Economy
- Volgograd Institute of Engineers of Municipal Economy
- Volgograd Civil Engineering Institute
- Volgograd State Academy of Architecture and Civil Engineering
- Volgograd State University of Architecture and Civil Engineering
