= Dubovka, Dubovsky District, Volgograd Oblast =

Town in Volgograd Oblast, Russia

Dubovka Дубовка
- Town
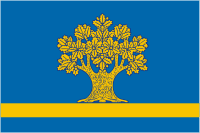
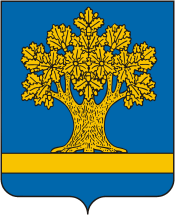
- Flag Coat of arms
- Interactive map of Dubovka
- Location of Dubovka Dubovka (Volgograd Oblast)
- Coordinates: 49°03′N 44°50′E
- Country: Russia
- Federal subject: Volgograd Oblast
- Administrative district: Dubovsky District
- Town of district significanceSelsoviet: Dubovka
- Founded: 1732
- Town status since: 1803
- Elevation: 50 m (160 ft)

Population (2010 Census)
  - Total: 14,347
  - Estimate (2021): 14,779 (+3%)

Administrative status
  - Capital of: Dubovsky District, town of district significance of Dubovka

Municipal status
  - Municipal district: Dubovsky Municipal District
  - Urban settlement: Dubovka Urban Settlement
  - Capital of: Dubovsky Municipal District, Dubovka Urban Settlement
- Time zone: UTC+3 (MSK)
- Postal code: 404002
- OKTMO ID: 18608101001

Dubovka (Russian: Дубо́вка) is a town and the administrative center of Dubovsky District in Volgograd Oblast, Russia, located on the right bank of the Volga River, 52 kilometers (32 mi) northeast of Volgograd, the administrative center of the oblast. Population: 14,347 (2010 census); 15,083 (2002 census); 13,668 (1989 Soviet census).

== History ==
It was founded in 1732 as a fort of the same name. It had been home to the Volga Cossacks since 1734. It was granted town status in 1803.

== Administrative and municipal status ==
Within the framework of administrative divisions, Dubovka serves as the administrative center of Dubovsky District. As an administrative division, it is incorporated within Dubovsky District as the town of district significance of Dubovka. As a municipal division, the town of district significance of Dubovka is incorporated within Dubovsky Municipal District as Dubovka Urban Settlement.
