= Dubovsky District, Volgograd Oblast =

Dubovsky District Дубовский район (Russian)
- District
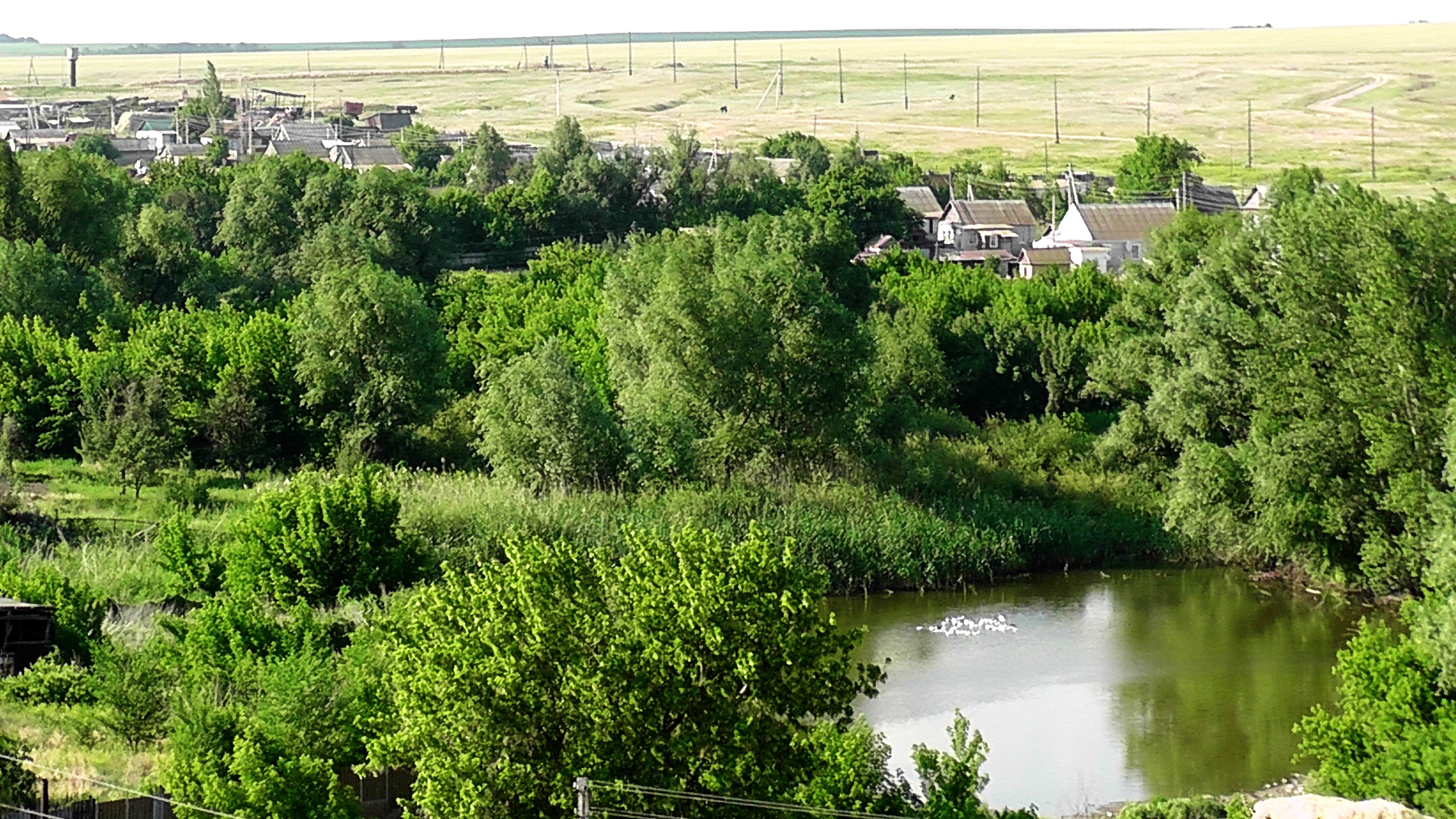
- Lozno, Dubovsky District

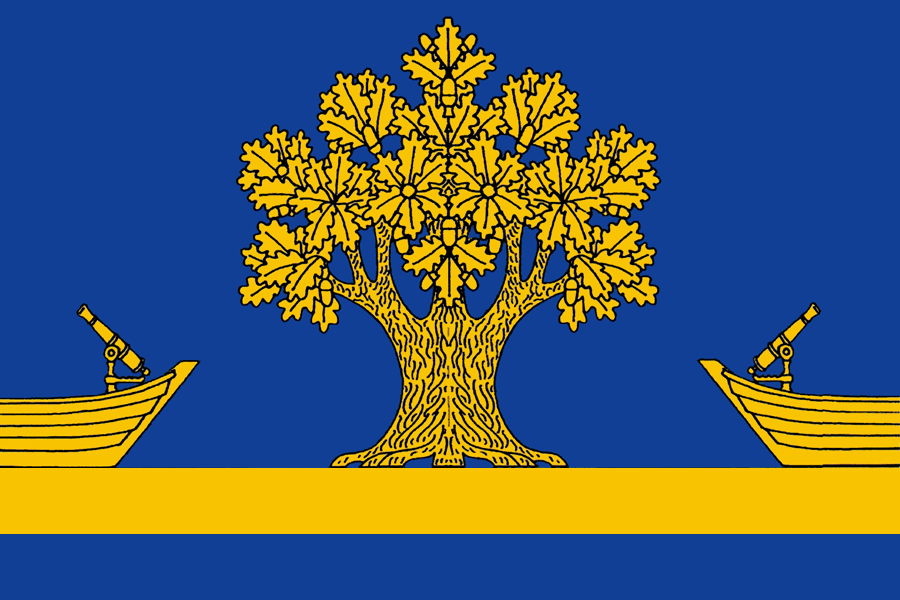
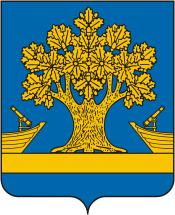
- Flag Coat of arms
- Location of Dubovsky District in Volgograd Oblast
- Coordinates: 49°03′N 44°50′E
- Country: Russia
- Federal subject: Volgograd Oblast
- Established: 23 June 1928
- Administrative center: Dubovka

Area
  - Total: 3,080 km^{2} (1,190 sq mi)

Population (2010 Census)
  - Total: 30,108
  - Density: 9.78/km^{2} (25.3/sq mi)
  - Urban: 47.7%
  - Rural: 52.3%

Administrative structure
  - Administrative divisions: 1 Towns of district significance, 14 Selsoviets
  - Inhabited localities: 1 cities/towns, 25 rural localities

Municipal structure
  - Municipally incorporated as: Dubovsky Municipal District
  - Municipal divisions: 1 urban settlements, 13 rural settlements
- Time zone: UTC+3 (MSK)
- OKTMO ID: 18608000
- Website: http://dubovreg.ru/

Dubovsky District (Russian: Дубо́вский райо́н) is an administrative district (raion), one of the thirty-three in Volgograd Oblast, Russia. As a municipal division, it is incorporated as Dubovsky Municipal District. It is located in the center of the oblast. The area of the district is 3,080 square kilometers (1,190 sq mi). Its administrative center is the town of Dubovka. Population: 30,108 (2010 census); 31,186 (2002 Census); 28,024 (1989 Soviet census). The population of Dubovka accounts for 47.7% of the district's total population.
