= Olkhovka, Volgograd Oblast =

Olkhovka Ольховка
- Selo
- Interactive map of Olkhovka
- Location of Olkhovka Olkhovka (Volgograd Oblast)
- Coordinates: 49°52′N 44°34′E
- Country: Russia
- Federal subject: Volgograd Oblast
- Administrative district: Olkhovsky District
- Elevation: 74 m (243 ft)

Population (2010 Census)
  - Total: 5,401
  - Estimate (2021): 5,444 (+0.8%)

Administrative status
  - Capital of: Olkhovsky District
- Time zone: UTC+3 (MSK)
- Postal code: 403651
- OKTMO ID: 18643434101

Olkhovka (Russian: Ольхо́вка) is a rural locality (a selo) and the administrative center of Olkhovsky District in Volgograd Oblast, Russia. Population: 5,401 (2010 census); 5,302 (2002 census); 4,429 (1989 Soviet census).
