= Olkhovsky District =

Olkhovsky District Ольховский район (Russian)
- District
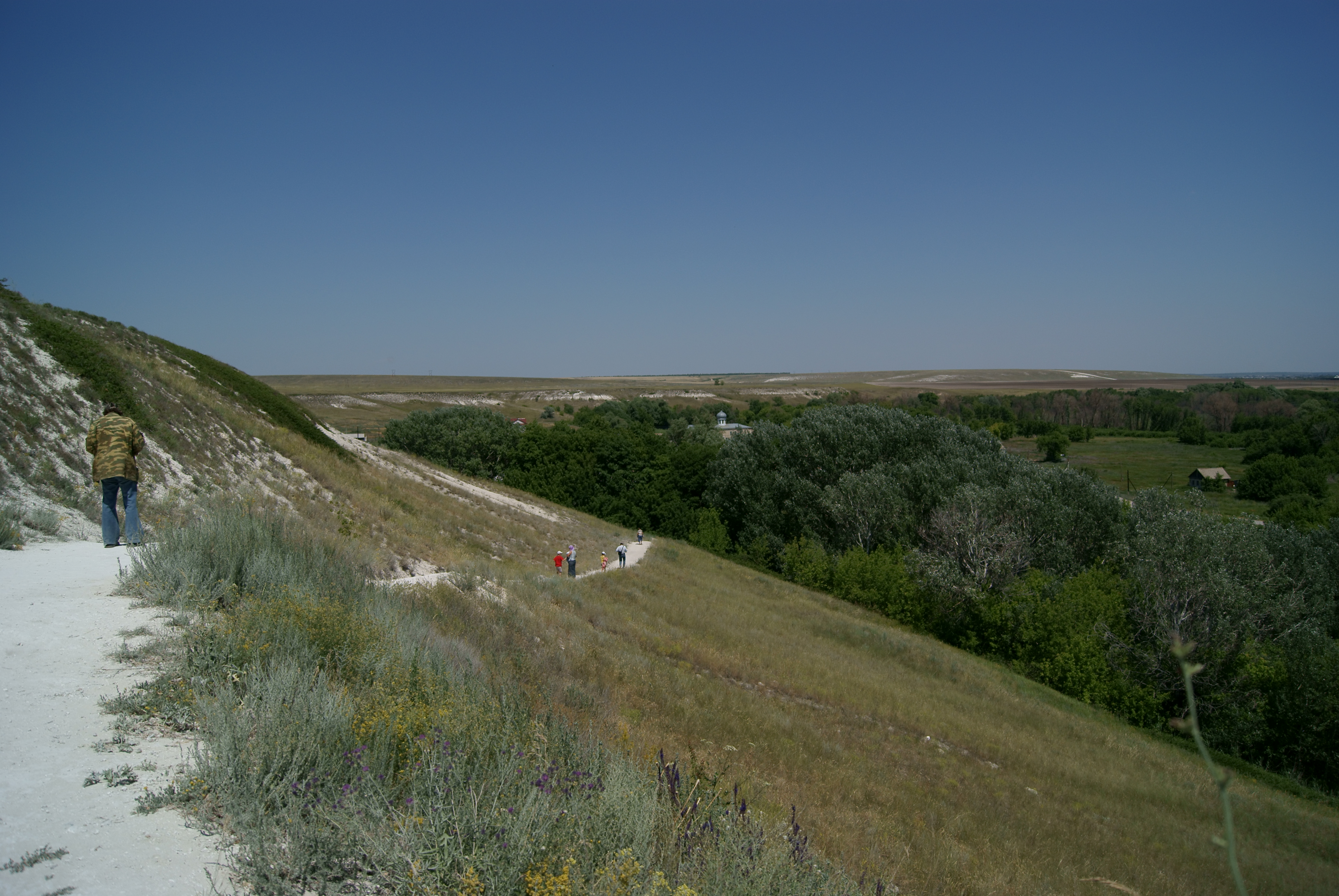
- Belogorsky Holy Trinity Monastery, Olkhovsky District
- Location of Olkhovsky District in Volgograd Oblast
- Coordinates: 49°51′N 44°34′E
- Country: Russia
- Federal subject: Volgograd Oblast
- Established: 25 October 1928
- Administrative center: Olkhovka

Area
  - Total: 3,300 km^{2} (1,300 sq mi)

Population (2010 Census)
  - Total: 17,626
  - Density: 5.3/km^{2} (14/sq mi)
  - Urban: 0%
  - Rural: 100%

Administrative structure
  - Administrative divisions: 14 selsoviet
  - Inhabited localities: 31 rural localities

Municipal structure
  - Municipally incorporated as: Olkhovsky Municipal District
  - Municipal divisions: 0 urban settlements, 13 rural settlements
- Time zone: UTC+3 (MSK)
- OKTMO ID: 18643000

Olkhovsky District (Russian: Ольхо́вский райо́н) is an administrative [district (raion), one of the thirty-three in Volgograd Oblast, Russia. Municipally, it is incorporated as Olkhovsky Municipal District. It is located in the center of the oblast. The area of the district is 3,300 square kilometers (1,300 sq mi). Its administrative center is the rural locality (a selo) of Olkhovka. Population: 17,626 (2010 census); 19,178 (2002 Census); 18,356 (1989 Soviet census). The population of Olkhovka accounts for 30.6% of the district's total population.
