= 4th Guards Rifle Division =

4th Guards Rifle Division (September 18, 1941 – 1946)
- Soviet Guards badge
- Active: 1941–1946
- Country: Soviet Union
- Branch: Red Army
- Type: Division
- Role: Infantry
- Engagements: World War II; Siege of Leningrad; Lyuban Offensive Operation; Battle of Stalingrad; Operation Uranus; Operation Little Saturn; Battle of Rostov (1943); Donbas Strategic Offensive; Lower Dniepr Offensive; Nikopol–Krivoi Rog Offensive; First Jassy–Kishinev Offensive; Second Jassy–Kishinev Offensive; Budapest Offensive; Siege of Budapest; Vienna Offensive
- Decorations: Order of the Red Banner
- Battle honours: Apostolovo; Vienna

Commanders
- Notable commanders: Col. Pyotr Fedorovich Moskvitin; Maj. Gen. Anatolii Yosifovich Andreev; Maj. Gen. Georgii Pavlovich Lilenkov; Col. Sergei Ivanovich Nikitin; Col. Yosef Kuzmich Stetsun; Maj. Gen. Gavriil Yefimovich Kukharev; Maj. Gen. Kuzma Dmitriyevich Parfyonov

The 4th Guards Rifle Division was reformed as an elite infantry division on September 18, 1941, from the 1st formation of the 161st Rifle Division as one of the original Guards formations of the Red Army, in recognition of that division's participation in the successful counter-offensive that drove German forces out of their positions at Yelnya. The division then moved northwards to serve in the defense of Leningrad, as well as the early attempts to break that city's siege, but later was redeployed to the southern sector of the front as the crisis around Stalingrad developed. The 4th Guards took part in Operation Uranus which surrounded the German 6th Army in and around that city and then in the pursuit operations that drove the remaining German forces from the Caucasus steppes and the city of Rostov. The division remained in this sector for the duration of the war, fighting through the south of Ukraine through the summer of 1943 and winning the Order of the Red Banner in the process; it was further distinguished with the award of a battle honor in February, 1944. During April and May its advance was halted during the battles along the Dniestr River, but resumed in the August offensive that carried it and its 31st Guards Rifle Corps into the Balkans. It served extensively in the fighting through Hungary and in the outer encirclement during the siege of Budapest in the winter of 1944/45 and in mid-April was awarded a second battle honor for its part in the capture of Vienna. Despite this distinguished service the division was disbanded in 1946.

== Formation ==
The 4th Guards was the last of four Guards rifle divisions created in the aftermath of the fighting for Yelnya. Unlike most later Guards divisions, its regiments and battalions retained their previous numbers with "Guards" added, as, for example: "477th Guards Rifle Regiment". On February 9, 1942 these were all re-designated, and its order of battle became as follows:

- 3rd Guards Rifle Regiment from 477th Rifle Regiment
- 8th Guards Rifle Regiment from 542nd Rifle Regiment
- 11th Guards Rifle Regiment from 603rd Rifle Regiment
- 23rd Guards Artillery Regiment from 632nd Howitzer Regiment
- 9th Guards Antitank Battalion from 135th Antitank Battalion
- 14th Guards Sapper Battalion from 154th Sapper Battalion
- 7th Guards Reconnaissance Battalion from 245th Reconnaissance Battalion
- 17th Guards Antiaircraft Battery from 475th Antiaircraft Battalion
- 5th Guards Signal Battalion from 422nd Signal Battalion (later 5th Guards Signal Company)
- 1st Guards Medical/Sanitation Battalion
- 2nd Guards Chemical Defense (Anti-gas) Company
- 6th Guards Motor Transport Company
- 13th Guards Field Bakery
- 10th Guards Divisional Veterinary Hospital
- 11961st Field Postal Station (later 827th)
- 173rd Field Office of the State Bank

The division also had an anti-aircraft machine-gun company, a training battalion and a band platoon. At around the same date, it also received the 16th Guards Mortar Battalion (82mm and 120mm mortars). Col. Pyotr Fedorovich Moskvitin, who had commanded the 161st since August 22, remained in command until September 30 when he was replaced by Maj. Gen. Anatolii Yosifovich Andreev.

== Battle of Leningrad ==
After a short period for rebuilding the 4th Guards was railed, along with its "sister" 3rd Guards Rifle Division, northwards to join the recently formed 54th Army in October, holding positions to the east of Leningrad. German forces had cut off and isolated that city on September 8. The 4th Guards was earmarked to take part in the First Sinyavino Offensive beginning on October 20, but this was preempted by the German offensive on Tikhvin. The division was quickly shifted to 4th Army; beginning on October 27 and again on November 4–6 it launched attacks which slowed but did not stop the German advance. By November 8 Tikhvin had fallen, but the German XXXIX Motorized Corps was vastly overextended with a tenuous line of supply. 4th Guards was made part of the Southern Operational Group of 4th Army, and commenced its counter-attack on the 19th. Progress was slow, but on December 8 the weakened German forces evacuated the town, and the division took part in the pursuit to the Volkhov River.

4th Guards would spend the next eight months in fighting along the Volkhov. In late January, 1942, it was transferred to 59th Army and took a supporting role in the opening stages of the ambitious Lyuban Offensive Operation, attempting to expand the penetration of 2nd Shock Army across the river with an attack alongside 65th, 327th and 372nd Rifle Divisions on January 27, but made little progress. In late March, while still under 59th Army, the division joined 372nd and 24th Guards Rifle Divisions, plus two rifle and one tank brigades, to form an operational group under Maj. Gen. I. T. Korovnikov intended to attack northwards to link with 52nd Army and clear the supply routes to 2nd Shock; by March 30 a tenuous gap 3 – 5 km wide had been cleared. On April 1 the operational group's headquarters was used to form 6th Guards Rifle Corps, and 4th Guards was drawn into reserve in the village of Selishchenskii for replenishing and refitting.

By the beginning of May, 2nd Shock was once more effectively cut off, and Lt. Gen. M.S. Khozin of Leningrad Front was proposing that 6th Guards Corps be refitted and break through to the encircled army to make it possible to complete the advance on Lyuban. Yet another narrow corridor was forced through the German cordon, but on May 16 the 4th Guards, along with the 24th Guards and most of the rest of their corps were obliged to withdraw eastwards again. Two days earlier General Andreev had been reassigned to a staff position in 59th Army and was replaced in command by Col. Sergei Timofeevich Biyakov, who was in turn succeeded by Maj. Gen. Georgii Pavlovich Lilenkov from the 378th Rifle Division on June 30. The division was moved, with its Corps, to Volkhov Front in July, then left the Corps and was dispatched south to join the newly formed 1st Guards Army.

== Stalingrad and aftermath ==
1st Guards Army was in Stalingrad Front and by August 9, as German Army Group B was about to seize Kalach-na-Donu, the Front was preparing the defense of Stalingrad between the Don and Volga rivers. The 1st Guards was ordered to deploy forward from Ilovlinskaia Station and by the end of August 14 was to have reached positions 15–20 km behind 4th Tank Army. On August 15 the German 6th Army began attacking into the northeast corner of the great bend of the Don and while this inflicted heavy casualties on both Soviet armies the 4th Guards escaped as it was still detraining at Ilovlia. 6th Army began its advance on Stalingrad on August 21 at which time the 4th Guards, with the 321st and 23rd Rifle Divisions had taken up a defense on a 20 km sector from Starodonskoi to the mouth of the Ilovlia River. This was part of a narrow bridgehead south of the Don from Kremenskaya to Sirotinskaya that was being screened by the German XI Army Corps. Beginning on August 22 and continuing over the next five days five divisions of 1st Guards Army, including the 4th Guards, forced XI Corps' troops to withdraw 8–10 km south of their original positions. While the German command downplayed this, the bridgehead would later cause the German Army much grief. On the night of August 31 the division left the bridgehead along with the Army headquarters and three other divisions into the Kotluban area east of the Don and north of the German corridor to Stalingrad.

=== Operation Uranus ===
As of September 3 the 4th Guards had been transferred to the 21st Army, still in Stalingrad Front. This formation of Stalingrad Front was renamed Don Front on September 30. On October 21 the 4th Tank Army was redesignated as the 65th Army and came under command of Lt. Gen. P. I. Batov; the division was transferred to it, still in Don Front. In the planning for Operation Uranus, 21st Army was to have a leading role in breaking out of the Kletskaya bridgehead, but the 65th was to provide support on its left. The offensive began on November 19 and in the first days the Army's units played a largely sacrificial role, attacking the defenses of XI Corps frontally to cover the rapid advance of 21st Army while Batov held his 4th and 40th Guards and 23rd Rifle Divisions in reserve. On November 23 the two Guards divisions were committed against the well-developed defenses of four reinforced battalions the 44th and 384th Infantry Divisions in the Sirotinskaya area. During the day the 4th Guards captured Hills 180.9 and 146.6 and advanced up to 5 km, reaching the eastern outskirts of Khmelevskii and beginning to envelop the position which prompted General Batov to commit the 321st Division to complete the envelopment the next day. The division's advance to the southeast continued and helped to force XI Corps to conduct a fighting withdrawal to new positions; by this time Batov and the commander of the neighboring 24th Army were exchanging recriminations for their mutual inability to encircle the German divisions by capturing Vertiachii east of the Don. On the night of November 25 Batov received orders to transfer the 4th and 40th Guards plus the 258th and 321st Rifle Divisions to the 5th Tank Army of Southwestern Front.

This transfer was due to the completion of the encirclement of 6th Army on November 23 and the fact that 5th Tank was having difficulty overcoming Axis-held strongpoints along the Chir and Don Rivers, in particular Oblivskaya, Surovikino and Rychkovskii. By now, after a week of fighting, the rifle divisions were down to about 6,500 men each. Overnight on November 29–30 the commander of 5th Tank was informed that 4th Guards was marching southwards to join his shock group attacking Verkhne-Chirskii, Rychkovskii and the adjacent German bridgeheads across the Don. Given 5th Tank's difficulties the new 5th Shock Army was formed on December 8 and the division was subordinated to it along with four other rifle divisions, one mechanized and two tank corps and the 3rd Guards Cavalry Corps. The Army became fully operational overnight on December 11/12. At this time the German relief of 6th Army was being planned and the STAVKA considered the Don bridgeheads the most likely staging base for it since they were less than half the distance to the pocket as the alternative axis from Kotelnikovo.

The Chir (Tormosin) Offensive had begun on December 7, led by 5th Tank Army's 333rd Rifle Division which penetrated the German defenses southwest of Ostrovskii and provided a passage to the 1st Tank Corps to occupy State Farm (Sovkhoz) No. 79, setting up an action that would become well known to English-speaking readers with the publication of von Mellenthin's Panzer Battles in the 1950s. The 4th Guards and 258th Divisions at this stage were tasked with containing the German forces south of the lower Chir River. 1st Tank Corps was soon badly battered by the newly arrived 11th Panzer Division and the 333rd Division was forced to retreat. A new offensive by 5th Shock began on the morning of December 13 led by 7th Tank Corps, assisted by 4th Guards and 258th Divisions, with the principal objectives of Rychkovskii and Verkhne-Chirskii. 4th Guards had concentrated opposite the Rychkovskii bridgehead on the left flank of 7th Tank on the end of the previous day. The attack began at 0700 hours and the 8th Guards Regiment soon seized an unnamed hill east of the town and held it against several infantry counterattacks, supported by five tanks. After its regimental guns destroyed two of these the way was clear for the 11th Guards Regiment to push into the town proper where it overcame a strongpoint north of the railway station, then the station itself before reaching the northern bank of the Don. The 3rd Guards Regiment then established defenses on the railroad bridge over the Don, cutting the retreat of part of the German garrison. The divisional history later noted:

The Rychkovskii bridgehead, which the enemy intended to use as a trampoline [springboard] for an offensive toward Stalingrad, ceased to exist by 1000 hours on 13 December.

That evening the commander of 5th Shock, Lt. Gen. M. M. Popov, ordered the attack to continue towards Verkhne-Chirskii. This bridgehead was also heavily fortified and defended by about 3,500 German troops and a large number of antitank guns. During December 14 the division, with 7th Tanks, fought towards the town. At the same time the 315th Rifle Division of Stalingrad Front crossed the Don and seized a bridgehead south of Nizhne-Chirskaia. Meanwhile, the German commander, Field Marshal E. von Manstein, was adamant that the bridgehead must be held for the sake of the morale of 6th Army. On December 15 the 5th Shock Army eliminated the bridgehead at Verkhne-Chirskii while the 11th Panzer was distracted and wearing itself out in the fighting south of Ostrovskii; the loss of the two bridgeheads effectively eliminated any prospect of a relief drive on the shorter route.

=== Offensive on Rostov ===
Over the next two weeks the 4th Guards worked its way south along the east bank of the Don until by December 28 it was opposite the village of Suvorovskii along with the 3rd Guards Cavalry Corps. The 5th Shock and 2nd Guards Armies began an offensive that day on the town of Tormosin against the partially-encircled positions of 4th Panzer Army's Group Mieth south of the Chir and west and north of the Don. By nightfall on the next day the division had secured a solid bridgehead on the western bank which allowed 3rd Guards Cavalry to cross overnight and early the next day and begin a steady advance which deepened the bridgehead to as much as 20 km. During the same night the Stalingrad Front was redesignated as the new Southern Front with the intention of coordinating the advance on Rostov-on-Don.

The division followed 5th Shock to the new Front on January 3, 1943. At this time the 2nd Guards Army was finishing clearing Group Mieth from the Tormosin region and began pursuing them towards the Tsimla River. In order to improve command and control of his forces north of the Don the Front commander, Col. Gen. A. I. Yeryomenko, formed an operational group under Lt. Gen. Ya. G. Kreizer consisting of 5th Shock and the right wing forces of 2nd Guards. Kreizer's group consolidated its positions along the Kumshak River overnight on January 3/4, then resumed its advance. As of January 7 Group Mieth was taking up positions along the Kagalnik River as the Soviet group prepared to advance from that line to the Northern Donets. Group Mieth was defending the town of Konstantinovskii on its right flank with just one battalion, but this was reinforced as elements of the 11th Panzer Division began to arrive.

In the fighting on January 7 the 5th Shock faced two regiments of the 336th Infantry Division and part of the 384th Infantry Division, reinforced by two battalions of the 7th Luftwaffe Field Division. The 315th and 258th Rifle Divisions found a gap in the defense, crossed the frozen Kagalnik and penetrated 8 km, threatening to encircle the 384th Infantry. 4th Guards, which was the Army's reserve, advanced into the gap. In response the weak 22nd Panzer Division was ordered to attack southward while 11th Panzer continued to concentrate south of the penetration. This led to a running battle from January 9–11 involving numerous German counterattacks which included the 7th Panzer Division starting on the 10th. At 0800 hours that day a report stated that the three rifle divisions "occupied the Alifanov - Novo-Rossoshinskii - Chumakov - Rossoshinskii - Kriukovskii (38km south of Tatsinskaia) region." 7th Panzer was a significant force with over 100 tanks, but had only limited time to inflict as much damage as possible since its presence was also required elsewhere. 5th Shock Army later reported:

On 10 January 1943, the enemy attacked the units of 258th RD and 4th Guards RD with the forces of up to a regiment of infantry and 100 tanks and, having created the threat of their complete encirclement, forced the latter to withdraw to Trofimov and Kriukovskii. On the night of 10–11 January 1943, 1328th and 362nd RRs of 315th RD, together with units of 258th RD and 4th Gds. RD, began a fighting withdrawal to the line of the Kagalnik River. Beginning at first light on 11 January 1943, the enemy continued to attack the withdrawing units of 315th and 258th RDs and 4th Gds. RD with a force of motorized infantry with a large number of tanks.

All three divisions suffered significant losses in this fighting and were withdrawn to the rear for rebuilding, which in the case of 4th Guards continued until at least January 24.

Hitler finally authorized Manstein to withdraw his forces from the eastern Donbas, including Rostov, on February 6. On the same day multiple battalions of the division and of the 258th and 40th Guards Rifle Divisions attacked across the Northern Donets near the boundary between the German 336th and 384th Infantry Divisions which produced heavy fighting but only meagre gains in an attempt to liberate the villages of Aparinskii and Krestovskii. The German withdrawal to the Mius River line began on February 8, taking 5th Shock by surprise, and was completed by February 18. During the Soviet advance the division reached the Mokryi Log region on the 11th and on the 13th cooperated with the 300th Rifle Division in taking the town of Bolshoi Dolzhik. On February 15 and 16 it was in the Army's second echelon protecting its left flank. Shortly after midnight on the 17th its lead elements approached Lysogorka where it concentrated through the day in preparation for a further advance the next morning which took it to Novo-Spasovka in readiness to attack toward Russkoe.

By February 21 5th Shock reached the Mius. On March 3 the Army was fortifying the scant bridgeheads it had taken on the west bank of the river, and the advance halted for the coming months. In April, the division became part of the 31st Guards Rifle Corps, and it would remain in that formation, with short exceptions, for the duration of the war.

== Into Ukraine and the Balkans ==
General Lilenkov was replaced in command of the division on June 5 by Col. Sergei Ivanovich Nikitin. On June 19 the 4th Guards was recognized for its distinguished service with the award of the Order of the Red Banner. After several failed attempts a new offensive starting on August 13 cracked the defenses of German 6th Army on the Mius line and it began to fall back to the Dniepr with Southern Front in pursuit. On September 13 Colonel Nikitin handed his command to Col. Yosef Kuzmich Stetsun. The Front was redesignated as 4th Ukrainian Front on October 20, and 4th Guards remained with it until nearly the end of the year when it was reassigned, along with its Corps, to 69th Army in the Reserve of the Supreme High Command for rebuilding. Colonel Stetsun had been replaced by Col. Gavriil Efimovich Kukharev on December 2. In January, 1944 the Corps was moved again, to 46th Army in 3rd Ukrainian Front. During the Nikopol–Krivoi Rog Offensive the division was awarded its first battle honor:

"APOSTOLOVO... 4th Guards Rifle Division (Colonel Kukharev, Gavriil Yefimovich)... The troops who broke through the enemy defenses and participated in the battles for Apostolovo and on the lower Dniepr, by the order of the Supreme High Command of February 6, 1944, and a commendation in Moscow, are given a salute of 20 artillery salvoes from 224 guns.

Colonel Kukharev was promoted to the rank of major general on March 19, just as the division was engaged in heavy combat within a small bridgehead over the Southern Bug north of the city of Mykolaiv. Strong German counterattacks forced a withdrawal to the river flats which were flooded from spring rains making them mostly indefensible and on the next day General Kukharev plus much of his command group perished. Due to the conditions it was impossible to recover the bodies for several weeks. In total the division suffered 126 officers and men killed, 246 wounded and 291 missing in action in three days of fighting. On March 21 Col. Kuzma Dmitriyevich Parfyonov took over as commander; he would be promoted to the rank of major general on April 19, 1945 and remained in command for the duration of the war.

=== Jassy-Kishinev Offensives ===
In early April 4 Guards was approaching the lower reaches of the Dniestr River in second echelon of 31st Guards Corps with orders to clear German forces from the town of Hlinaia on the east bank, assault across the river at and to the south of Cioburciu, capture a German strong point there and prepare to expand its bridgehead to the west. The east bank was cleared by late on April 11 and on the 13th elements of 40th Guards Rifle Division managed to secure a small bridgehead south of Cioburciu, later reinforced by 34th Guards Rifle Division, but they were stymied in their attempts to take the town. On April 20 the 4th Guards, along with its two corps-mates, made another attack on Cioburciu, but this collapsed immediately after it commenced. In the first week of May, all three divisions went over to the defense.

Prior to the start of the Second Jassy-Kishinev Offensive the 31st Guards Corps was brought from the reserve of 3rd Ukrainian Front under cover of darkness to insert into the 46th Army's right flank and form the Army's shock group along with 37th Rifle Corps. The Army was covering a front along the southernmost 111 km of the Dniestr, but its main attack took place on an 8 km front between Talmaza and Cioburciu. 4th Guards was in first echelon with 34th Guards; 40th Guards was in second echelon and could not be committed without permission of the Army commander. The immediate objective was the town of Volintiri and the attack faced units of the Romanian 4th Mountain and 21st Infantry Divisions. Artillery support on the attack front was between 200 and 250 guns per kilometre and 4th Guards Mechanized Corps formed the shock group's exploitation force.

The offensive began with a powerful artillery preparation just after dawn on August 20 and almost immediately gained important successes. The shock group broke through the German XXIX Army Corps' defense along the boundary with XXX Army Corps and in cooperation with the 6th Guards Rifle Corps of 37th Army inflicted a heavy defeat of the 4th Mountain and threw the 21st Infantry out of its positions. During the day the positions at Talmaza and Cioburciu which had caused so many casualties and frustrations in the spring were taken as the Axis defenders slowly withdrew. By the end of the day the 31st Guards Corps had reached a line stretching south of Yermokliya while remaining in contact with 37th Corps to its south. In total the penetration was up to 11–12 km deep and 40 km wide. The next day the 4th Guards Mechanized was committed to the fighting at 0900 hours in the direction of Tarutino. With the Axis XXIX Corps falling back to the southwest by the end of the day the 4th and 34th Guards reached a line between Volintiri and Aleksandren and the badly weakened 4th Mountain, 13th Panzer, and 306th Infantry Divisions were facing encirclement; during the night they fell back towards Tokuz.

August 22 saw a significant change to 46th Army's role in the offensive. 4th Mechanized was directed to the northwest to take part in the encirclement of the Axis Chișinău grouping while the 46th began an independent operation to trap the Romanian 3rd Army against the north coast of the Black Sea. By the end of the day the 4th and 34th Guards had advanced on the right flank over 20 km against sporadic resistance and reached the Cogâlnic River from Leiptsig to Akkerman, and the Corps' forward detachment took the important road junction at Tarutino. As this trap began to close the next day the Romanian forces fell back hurriedly, trying to break through to the west and south. By evening the 4th and 34th Guards had closed to a line from Ferapotyanka to Ceadîr-Lunga, facing west, while 40th Guards remained in reserve as a flank guard. Overall the encirclement had been completed by this time and the Romanian 15th, 2nd and 110th Infantry and 1st Cavalry Divisions along with the German 9th Infantry Division were cut off; the Romanian troops in particular were resisting weakly and surrendering. The 31st Guards Corps was also close to seizing crossings over the Danube.

On August 23 the Corps was ordered northwest to reestablish contact with 37th Army and reached a line from Ferapontovka to Tomai. As a result of its successes in this campaign the 8th Guards Rifle Regiment received the battle honor "Lower Dniestr". As the division continued to advance on August 28 the 3rd Guards Rifle Regiment and the 23rd Guards Artillery Regiment were given an honorific for their parts in the liberation of the Romanian city of Brăila, and on September 8 the 11th Guards Rifle Regiment was similarly recognized for its role in the taking of the Bulgarian city of Ruse.

== Into Hungary and Austria ==
In September the 31st Guards Corps, still with 46th Army, was moved to 2nd Ukrainian Front, where it remained into November, although as of the beginning of the month the 4th Guards was a separate division under Army command. The 46th's part in the first stage of the offensive on Budapest began at 1400 hours on October 29 with an advance in the direction of Kecskemét and ultimately the Hungarian capital itself. It faced forces of the Hungarian 3rd Army with the 13th and 31st SS Divisions and 24th Panzer Division. On the first day the Army advanced between 8–15 km despite numerous counterattacks and the fighting continued into the night. By the end of October 31 the penetration had been deepened to 24–40 km and on November 4 the Army reached a line from Üllő to Dömsöd which marked the outer line of the Budapest defenses, but was unable to capture the city due to the shifting of Axis reserves and was ordered to temporarily go over to the defense. It returned to the attack on November 11 but apart from clearing several bridgeheads on the east bank of the Danube achieved little else up to the 26th.

=== Encirclement of Budapest ===
Later that month the 4th Guards returned to 31st Guards Corps which was subordinated to 4th Guards Army and which also entailed a return to 3rd Ukrainian Front. 4th Guards Rifle Division and its Corps would serve under those commands for the duration, with brief exceptions. As the offensive developed on November 30 the Front advanced from 4–28 km while 4th Guards Army gained 16 km and reached a line from Tolna to Kisvaszar. In accordance with a prior plan, 31st Guards Corps was to force the Danube with its main forces in the Madocsa area. The 40th Guards Division led the crossing with the 4th Guards in second echelon; it was to take Dunaföldvár by the morning of December 2. The crossing operation came as a surprise to the Axis defenders and on December 1 the Front, led by 31st Corps, advanced as much as 26 km and was involved in street fighting for the town of Dombóvár.

On December 20 the 4th Guards and 46th Armies began a new drive to complete the encirclement of Budapest. 4th Guards Army had five rifle divisions in the first echelon, including the 4th and 40th Guards of 31st Guards Corps, with the immediate task of defeating the Axis forces between Lake Velence and the Sárvíz Canal and capture the city of Székesfehérvár no later than the end of the second day. After an artillery preparation of 40 minutes the infantry attack stepped off at 1145 hours. The Corps had the direct support of the 26th Light Artillery Brigade, 466th Mortar Regiment, 230th Howitzer Regiment, two assault engineer-sapper battalions and the 366th Guards Self-Propelled Artillery Regiment equipped with ISU-122s. 4th Guards Army faced a mix of German and Hungarian units including the 23rd Panzer and elements of the 1st Panzer Divisions, an SS infantry regiment, a Hungarian cavalry regiment and elements of three infantry regiments. These forces were holding along a position called the "Margarita Line".

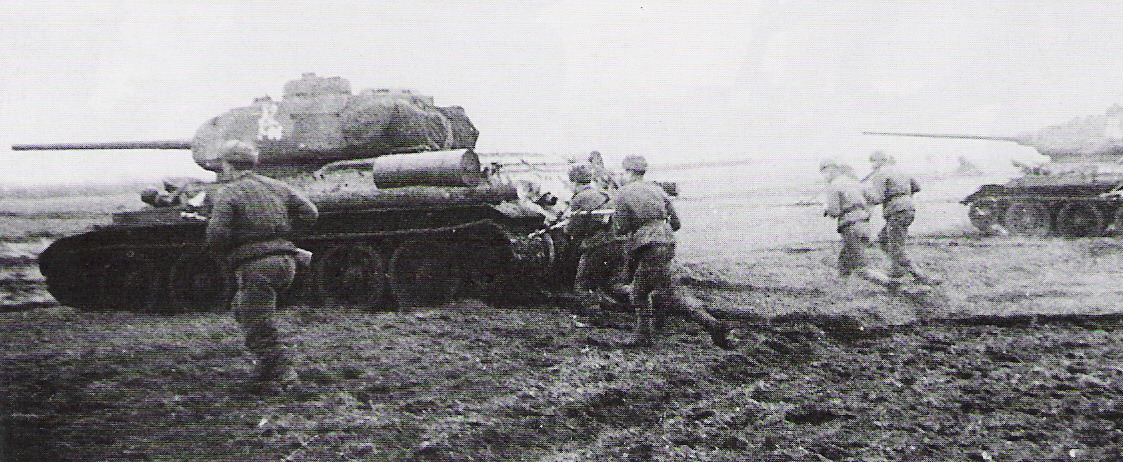
A counterattack by Soviet infantry and tanks of the 18th Guards Tank Corps.

The 4th and 40th Guards Divisions bypassed Lake Velence from the west to force crossings on the Csaszar Vis River, and while beating off company-sized counterattacks backed by platoons of tanks by 1900 hours on December 21 had reached a line as far as the northern outskirts of Pákozd and east and south of Kisfalud. During the day the 34th Guards Division was committed from second echelon on the boundary between the 4th and 40th but failed to reach its objectives due to heavy resistance. On the morning of December 22 up to 300 German tanks and self-propelled guns of the 3rd, 6th and 23rd Panzer Divisions began a counteroffensive that had been planned before the Soviet offensive began and mainly struck the 46th Army. Staging from the Lovasberény area the tank force retook Velence and continued to advance in the face of counterattacks by 18th Guards Tank Corps. The artillery of this Corps and the 31st Guards Corps was brought up to carry out a powerful bombardment of Vereb, after which the tanks were able to retake it. By the end of the day the situation on 46th Army's left flank was being restored, in part by linking up with 4th Guards Division which was attacking north of Lake Velence. As a result of this linkup individual German groups in the Nadap area and the Lovasberény woods were cut off from their units and eventually destroyed by the 180th Rifle Division.

By this time the 4th Guards Army had outflanked Székesfehérvár from three sides and the city was stormed and taken on December 23. The "Margarita Line" had now been pierced along a 75 km front to a depth of 15–20 km and the Axis forces had been effectively crushed with no reserves available. The Army now ordered the victory to be exploited with the 31st Guards Corps following the 18th Guards Tanks in the direction of Vértesacsa. On the following day the tank corps in cooperation with the 31st and 10th Guards Rifle Corps outflanked and captured Bicske and continued to cut the last routes out of Budapest to the northwest, destroying or capturing many Axis troops and rear establishments retreating from the city. On December 25 the two Soviet armies met the 2nd Ukrainian Front and completed the encirclement of the Hungarian capital, trapping nine Axis divisions consisting of about 100.000 men. By December 29 the 4th Guards Army was stretched along a line up to 160 km long from the Danube to the south shore of Lake Balaton and was facing powerful resistance so was incapable of further advance. The Soviet command now expected a German counteroffensive to relieve their encircled forces, based partly on past experience and partly on intelligence about the arrival of the IV SS Panzer Corps from Poland. These preparations were in fact underway, based on positions about 20 km east of Komárom, but as a distraction their forces opposite 4th Guards Army mounted a powerful attack on December 30 against its left flank; this was beaten off and by the end of the day the 31st Guards Corps in cooperation with 18th Guards Tanks was fighting heavily in the northern part of the Vértes Hegyseg hills. The next day the Army was ordered to go over to the defensive and strongly cover the Budapest axis from the west.

=== Operation Konrad ===
The true German counterattack began on January 2, 1945. At this time the 4th Guards Division was on the Army's right with one regiment covering the open flank along a line from Nyergesújfalu to Süttő, while another was along the line from Bajna to Nagysáp to Mogyorósbánya facing east as a screen in the event of an attempt by Axis groups to break out from woods northeast of Budapest. The third regiment was on the German attack front, covering the south bank of the Danube along a 15 km front; overall the 31st Guards Corps was occupying a front 48 km wide. Following a powerful 10-minute artillery strike the assault began in darkness at 0230 hours. The German 96th Infantry Division began to force the Danube in the areas of Nyergesújfalu and Süttő and attempted to capture a pass through the hills east of Agostyan but this was held with the help of the Corps' meagre reserves. Overall the German offensive made little progress on its first day except on the sector of the 80th Guards Rifle Division, but given their advantage in armor all available units, mostly artillery, were brought up to reinforce the 4th Guards Army. On January 3 the IV SS Panzer Corps was committed in the direction of Bicske, but part of its forces were halted by withdrawing elements of the division, backed by the advancing 18th Guards Tanks, along the Sárisáp-Bajna line. However, in the face of German superiority in manpower and armor, the division was suffering heavy losses, not receiving replacements, and was forced to fall back before long. By the end of the day its remnants were being gathered, put in order, and moved to the line of the southern outskirts of Bajna.

During the next two days the German force continued their drive on Bicske, and the 4th Guards Division joined a position in depth along with the 80th Guards, which had also been damaged in the earlier fighting, and the 62nd Guards Rifle Division along a line from Gebeljuras to Hatvan to Alcsútdoboz, backed by the 49th Antitank Artillery Regiment. These forces were temporarily subordinated to the 21st Guards Rifle Corps. January 5 saw the turning point of the battle with heavy fighting involving a large number of tanks on both sides but the vast quantity of artillery on the Soviet side paralyzed the German attackers, although they persisted for two more days. On January 6 the 8th Rifle Regiment and the 11th Rifle Regiment were decorated for their services in the battles for the towns of Kaposvár, Paks, Bonyhád and Dombóvár in earlier fighting in southwestern Hungary; the former received the Order of the Red Banner and the latter the Order of Kutuzov, 3rd Degree.

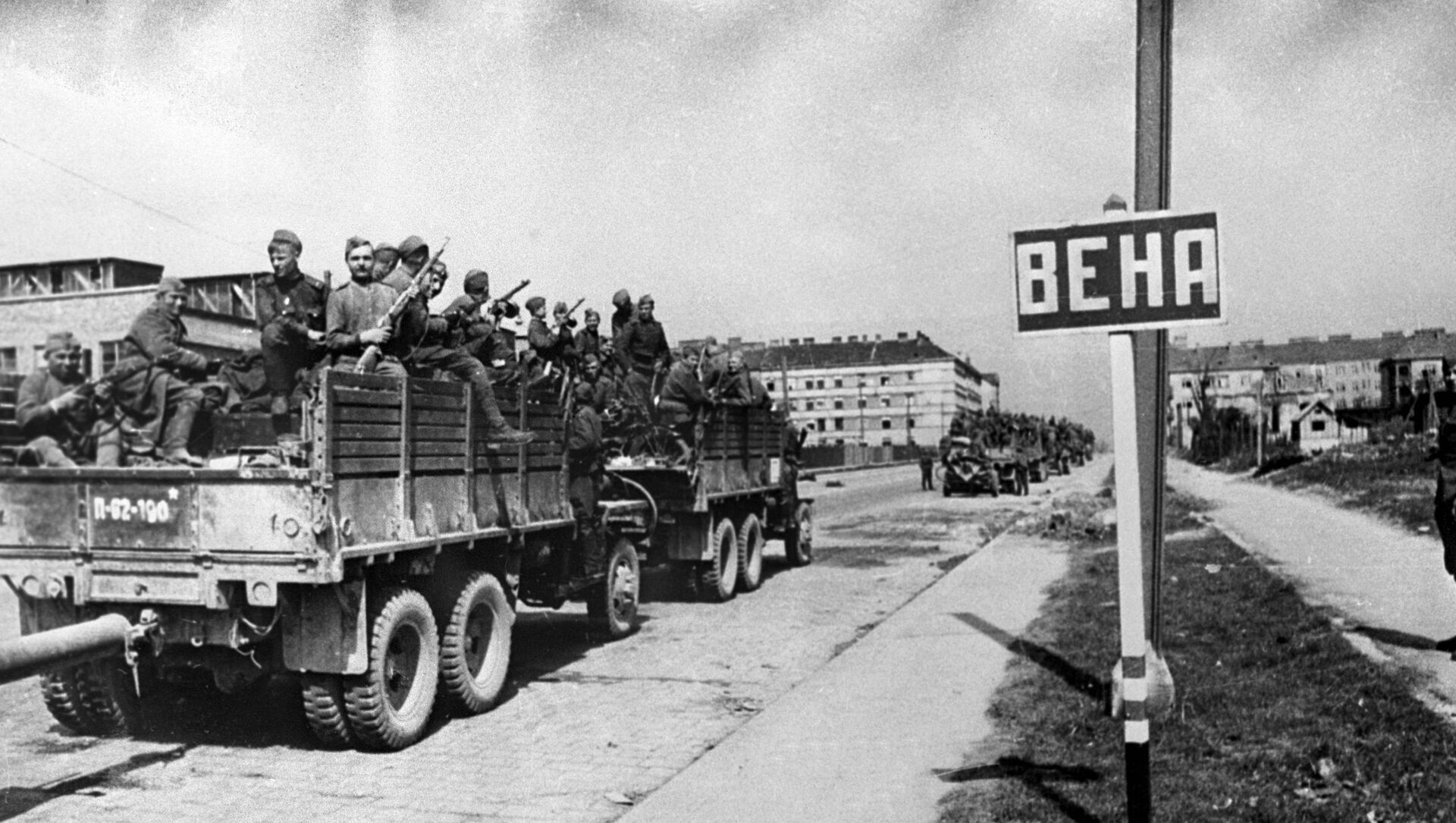
Soviet troops in the Vienna Offensive

The siege of Budapest ended on February 13 and in the spring of 1945 the division advanced across the Hungarian plain into Austria and gained its second honorific:

"VIENNA... 4th Guards Rifle Division (Colonel Parfyonov, Kuzma Dmitrievich)... The troops participating in the battles for the liberation of Vienna, by the order of the Supreme High Command of April 13, 1945, and a commendation in Moscow, are given a salute of 24 artillery salvoes from 324 guns.

By mid-April, the 4th Guards Army transitioned to defense along the right bank of the Danube, continuing along the Traisen river. The 4th Guards Rifle Division concentrated northwest of Vienna, where the German surrender found them concentrated in the area of Großhain, Diendorf, Zagging, and Klein to the north of Sankt Pölten. On April 26 the 3rd Regiment was awarded the Order of Kutuzov, 3rd Degree, for its successes in the fighting for the towns of Szombathely and Kapuvár. Two days later two men of the division were made Heroes of the Soviet Union. Guards Maj. Aleksandr Moseevich Koval led a battalion of the 23rd Guards Artillery Regiment and was cited for his command of his guns during the advance on Vienna and during the division's crossing of the Danube Canal even while being wounded. Guards Col. Ivan Nikiforovich Panchenko had commanded the 8th Guards Regiment since March, 1944, had distinguished himself on many occasions during the Ukrainian and Balkan campaigns and received his Gold Star after having been previously recommended for it in December. At the end of the war, the official title of the division was 4th Guards Rifle Apostolovo-Vienna Order of the Red Banner Division. (Russian: 4-я гвардейская стрелковая Апостоловско-Венская Краснознамённая дивизия.)

== Postwar ==
The division became part of the 25th Guards Rifle Corps and moved to the Tauric Military District during the spring of 1946. The division was stationed at Melitopol and disbanded in the fall of 1946.

== Bibliography ==
- Affairs Directorate of the Ministry of Defense of the Soviet Union (1967). Сборник приказов РВСР, РВС СССР, НКО и Указов Президиума Верховного Совета СССР о награждении орденами СССР частей, соединениий и учреждений ВС СССР. Часть I. 1920 - 1944 гг [Collection of orders of the RVSR, RVS USSR and NKO on awarding orders to units, formations and establishments of the Armed Forces of the USSR. Part I. 1920–1944] (in Russian).
- Affairs Directorate of the Ministry of Defense of the Soviet Union (1967). Сборник приказов РВСР, РВС СССР, НКО и Указов Президиума Верховного Совета СССР о награждении орденами СССР частей, соединениий и учреждений ВС СССР. Часть II. 1945 - 1966 гг [Collection of orders of the RVSR, RVS USSR and NKO on awarding orders to units, formations and establishments of the Armed Forces of the USSR. Part II. 1945–1966] (in Russian).
- Feskov, V.I.; Golikov, V.I.; Kalashnikov, K.A.; Slugin, S.A. (2013). Вооруженные силы СССР после Второй Мировой войны: от Красной Армии к Советской [The Armed Forces of the USSR after World War II: From the Red Army to the Soviet: Part 1 Land Forces] (in Russian). Tomsk: Scientific and Technical Literature Publishing. ISBN 9785895035306.
- Kadyrov, N. Z. (1985). От Минска до Вены: Боевой путь 4-й гвардейской стрелковой Апостоловско-Венской Краснознаменной дивизии [From Minsk to Vienna: The Combat Path of the 4th Guards Apostolovo-Vienna Red Banner Rifle Division] (in Russian). Moscow: Voenizdat. OCLC 609329268.
- Main Personnel Directorate of the Ministry of Defense of the Soviet Union (1964). Командование корпусного и дивизионного звена советских вооруженных сил периода Великой Отечественной войны 1941–1945 гг [Commanders of Corps and Divisions in the Great Patriotic War, 1941–1945] (in Russian). Moscow: Frunze Military Academy. pp. 182, 299
