= Fastov, Volgograd Oblast =

Fastov Фастов
- Khutor
- Location within Volgograd Oblast Location within Russia
- Coordinates: 49°04′N 44°12′E
- Country: Russia
- Region: Volgograd Oblast
- District: Ilovlinsky District
- Time zone: UTC+4:00

Fastov (Russian: Фастов) is a rural locality (a khutor) and the administrative center of Fastovskoye Rural Settlement, Ilovlinsky District, Volgograd Oblast, Russia. The population was 132 as of 2010. There are 9 streets.

== Geography ==
Fastov is located in steppe, on the right bank of the Talovaya River, on the Volga Upland, 41 km southeast of Ilovlya (the district's administrative centre) by road. Kotluban is the nearest rural locality.
