= Kostarevo, Volgograd Oblast =

Kostarevo Костарево
- Selo
- Location within Volgograd Oblast Location within Russia
- Coordinates: 50°03′N 44°57′E
- Country: Russia
- Region: Volgograd Oblast
- District: Kamyshinsky District
- Time zone: UTC+4:00

Kostarevo (Russian: Костарево) is a rural locality (a selo) and the administrative center of Kostarevskoye Rural Settlement, Kamyshinsky District, Volgograd Oblast, Russia. The population was 1,011 as of 2010. There are 12 streets.

== Geography ==
Kostarevo is by road on the Volga Upland, on the Ilovlya River, 35 km west of Kamyshin (the district's administrative centre). Petrunino is the nearest rural locality.
