= Shirokov, Volgograd Oblast =

Shirokov Широков
- Khutor
- Location within Volgograd Oblast Location within Russia
- Coordinates: 49°07′N 44°16′E
- Country: Russia
- Region: Volgograd Oblast
- District: Ilovlinsky District
- Time zone: UTC+4:00

Shirokov (Russian: Широков) is a rural locality (a khutor) in Fastovskoye Rural Settlement, Ilovlinsky District, Volgograd Oblast, Russia. The population was 129 as of 2010. There are 6 streets.

== Geography ==
Shirokov is located in steppe, on the right bank of the Talovaya River, on the Volga Upland, 48 km southeast of Ilovlya (the district's administrative centre) by road. Fastov is the nearest rural locality.
