= Torpovka =

Torpovka Торповка
- Khutor
- Location within Volgograd Oblast Location within Russia
- Coordinates: 50°08′N 45°22′E
- Country: Russia
- Region: Volgograd Oblast
- District: Kamyshinsky District
- Time zone: UTC+4:00

Torpovka (Russian: Торповка) is a rural locality (a khutor) in Michurinskoye Rural Settlement, Kamyshinsky District, Volgograd Oblast, Russia. The population was 441 as of 2010. There are 31 streets.

== Geography ==
Torpovka is located on the Volga Upland, on the right bank of the Yelshanka River, 9 km north of Kamyshin (the district's administrative centre) by road. Michurinsky is the nearest rural locality.
