= Kondrashi =

Locality in Volgograd Oblast, Russia

Kondrashi Кондраши
- Selo
- Location within Volgograd Oblast Location within Russia
- Coordinates: 49°26′N 44°11′E
- Country: Russia
- Region: Volgograd Oblast
- District: Ilovlinsky District
- Time zone: UTC+4:00

Kondrashi (Russian: Кондраши) is a rural locality (a selo) and the administrative center of Kondrashovskoye Rural Settlement, Ilovlinsky District, Volgograd Oblast, Russia. The population was 846 as of 2010. There are 14 streets.

== Geography ==
Kondrashi is located in steppe, on the left bank of the Ilovlya River, on the Volga Upland, 23 km northeast of Ilovlya (the district's administrative centre) by road. Pisaryovka is the nearest rural locality.
