= Guselka =

Guselka Гуселка
- Selo
- Location within Volgograd Oblast Location within Russia
- Coordinates: 50°27′N 45°09′E
- Country: Russia
- Region: Volgograd Oblast
- District: Kamyshinsky District
- Time zone: UTC+4:00

Guselka (Russian: Гусёлка) is a rural locality (a selo) and the administrative center of Guselskoye Rural Settlement, Kamyshinsky District, Volgograd Oblast, Russia. The population was 332 as of 2010. There are 13 streets.

== Geography ==
Guselka is located in forest steppe, on the Volga Upland, 75 km northwest of Kamyshin (the district's administrative centre) by road. Kalinovka is the nearest rural locality.
