= Shcherbatovka =

Shcherbatovka Щербатовка
- Selo
- Location within Volgograd Oblast Location within Russia
- Coordinates: 50°29′N 45°41′E
- Country: Russia
- Region: Volgograd Oblast
- District: Kamyshinsky District
- Time zone: UTC+4:00

Shcherbatovka (Russian: Щербатовка) is a rural locality (a selo) in Vodnobuyerachnoye Rural Settlement, Kamyshinsky District, Volgograd Oblast, Russia. The population was 210 as of 2010. There are 6 streets.

== Geography ==
Shcherbatovka is located on the Volga Upland, 57 km northeast of Kamyshin (the district's administrative centre) by road. Shcherbakovka is the nearest rural locality.
