= Zimoveysky =

Zimoveysky Зимовейский
- Khutor
- Location within Volgograd Oblast Location within Russia
- Coordinates: 49°07′N 43°55′E
- Country: Russia
- Region: Volgograd Oblast
- District: Ilovlinsky District
- Time zone: UTC+4:00

Zimoveysky (Russian: Зимовейский) is a rural locality (a khutor) in Tryokhostrovskoye Rural Settlement, Ilovlinsky District, Volgograd Oblast, Russia. The population was 136 as of 2010. There are 5 streets.

== Geography ==
Zimoveysky is located in steppe, on the Don River, on south of the Volga Upland, 50 km south of Ilovlya (the district's administrative centre) by road. Tryokhostrovskaya is the nearest rural locality.
