= Kamensky, Ilovlinsky District, Volgograd Oblast =

Kamensky Каменский
- Khutor
- Location within Volgograd Oblast Location within Russia
- Coordinates: 49°28′N 43°36′E
- Country: Russia
- Region: Volgograd Oblast
- District: Ilovlinsky District
- Time zone: UTC+4:00

Kamensky (Russian: Каменский) is a rural locality (a khutor) in Novogrigoryevskoye Rural Settlement, Ilovlinsky District, Volgograd Oblast, Russia. The population was 46 as of 2010.

== Geography ==
Kamensky is located on the Don River, on south of Volga Upland, 47 km northwest of Ilovlya (the district's administrative centre) by road. Novogrigoryevskaya is the nearest rural locality.
