= Kolotsky =

Kolotsky Колоцкий
- Khutor
- Location within Volgograd Oblast Location within Russia
- Coordinates: 49°15′N 43°59′E
- Country: Russia
- Region: Volgograd Oblast
- District: Ilovlinsky District
- Time zone: UTC+4:00

Kolotsky (Russian: Колоцкий) is a rural locality (a khutor) in Ilovlinskoye Rural Settlement, Ilovlinsky District, Volgograd Oblast, Russia. The population was 257 as of 2010. There are 22 streets.

== Geography ==
Kolotsky is located in steppe, on the Volga Upland, 6 km south of Ilovlya (the district's administrative centre) by road. Ilovlya is the nearest rural locality.
