= Shiryayevsky =

Shiryayevsky Ширяевский
- Khutor
- Location within Volgograd Oblast Location within Russia
- Coordinates: 49°34′N 44°02′E
- Country: Russia
- Region: Volgograd Oblast
- District: Ilovlinsky District
- Time zone: UTC+4:00

Shiryayevsky (Russian: Ширяевский) is a rural locality (a khutor) and the administrative center of Shiryayevskoye Rural Settlement, Ilovlinsky District, Volgograd Oblast, Russia. The population was 855 as of 2010. There are 16 streets.

== Geography ==
Shiryayevsky is located in steppe, on the Shiryay River, on the Volga Upland, 42 km north of Ilovlya (the district's administrative centre) by road. Nizhniye Lipki is the nearest rural locality.
