= Belogorki =

Belogorki Белогорки
- Selo
- Location within Volgograd Oblast Location within Russia
- Coordinates: 49°57′N 45°11′E
- Country: Russia
- Region: Volgograd Oblast
- District: Kamyshinsky District
- Time zone: UTC+4:00

Belogorki (Russian: Белогорки) is a rural locality (a selo) in Belogorskoye Rural Settlement, Kamyshinsky District, Volgograd Oblast, Russia. The population was 192 as of 2010. There are 5 streets.

== Geography ==
Belogorki is located on the Volga Upland, 27 km southwest of Kamyshin (the district's administrative centre) by road. Gosselekstantsiya is the nearest rural locality.
