= Kalinovka, Volgograd Oblast =

Kalinovka Калиновка
- Khutor
- Location within Volgograd Oblast Location within Russia
- Coordinates: 50°27′N 45°14′E
- Country: Russia
- Region: Volgograd Oblast
- District: Kamyshinsky District
- Time zone: UTC+4:00

Kalinovka (Russian: Калиновка) is a rural locality (a khutor) in Semyonovskoye Rural Settlement, Kamyshinsky District, Volgograd Oblast, Russia. The population was 301 as of 2010. There are 6 streets.

== Geography ==
Kalinovka is located on the Volga Upland, 67 km northwest of Kamyshin (the district's administrative centre) by road. Semyonovka is the nearest rural locality.
