= Veselovo, Volgograd Oblast =

Veselovo Веселово
- Selo
- Location within Volgograd Oblast Location within Russia
- Coordinates: 50°15′N 45°16′E
- Country: Russia
- Region: Volgograd Oblast
- District: Kamyshinsky District
- Time zone: UTC+4:00

Veselovo (Russian: Веселово) is a rural locality (a selo) in Michurinskoye Rural Settlement, Kamyshinsky District, Volgograd Oblast, Russia. The population was 454 as of 2010. There are 5 streets.

== Geography ==
Veselovo is located on the Volga Upland, on the right bank of the Ilovlya River, 25 km northwest of Kamyshin (the district's administrative centre) by road. Dvoryanskoye is the nearest rural locality.
