= Posyolok fermy 3 sovkhoza Dobrinsky =

Posyolok fermy 3 sovkhoza Dobrinsky Посёлок фермы № 3 совхоза «Добринский»
- Settlement
- Location within Volgograd Oblast Location within Russia
- Coordinates: 50°18′N 45°32′E
- Country: Russia
- Region: Volgograd Oblast
- District: Kamyshinsky District
- Time zone: UTC+4:00

Posyolok fermy 3 sovkhoza Dobrinsky (Russian: Посёлок фермы № 3 совхоза «Добринский») is a rural locality (a settlement) in Verkhnedobrinskoye Rural Settlement, Kamyshinsky District, Volgograd Oblast, Russia. The population was 83 as of 2010. There are 3 streets.

== Geography ==
The settlement is located in steppe, on the Volga Upland, on the west bank of the Volgograd Reservoir, 33 km northeast of Kamyshin (the district's administrative centre) by road. Nagorny is the nearest rural locality.
