= Shcherbakovka =

Shcherbakovka Щербаковка
- Selo
- Location within Volgograd Oblast Location within Russia
- Coordinates: 50°30′N 45°45′E
- Country: Russia
- Region: Volgograd Oblast
- District: Kamyshinsky District
- Time zone: UTC+4:00

Shcherbakovka (Russian: Щербаковка) is a rural locality (a selo) in Vodnobuyerachnoye Rural Settlement, Kamyshinsky District, Volgograd Oblast, Russia. The population was 182 as of 2010. There are 5 streets.

== Geography ==
Shcherbakovka is located on the Volga Upland, on the west bank of the Volgograd Reservoir, 63 km northeast of Kamyshin (the district's administrative centre) by road. Shcherbatovka is the nearest rural locality.
