= Obilny =

Obilny Обильный
- Settlement
- Location within Volgograd Oblast Location within Russia
- Coordinates: 49°14′N 44°20′E
- Country: Russia
- Region: Volgograd Oblast
- District: Ilovlinsky District
- Time zone: UTC+4:00

Obilny (Russian: Обильный) is a rural locality (a settlement) in Medvedevskoye Rural Settlement, Ilovlinsky District, Volgograd Oblast, Russia. The population was 86 as of 2010.

== Geography ==
Obilny is located on Volga Upland, on the left bank of the Loznaya River, 46 km southeast of Ilovlya (the district's administrative centre) by road. Loznoye is the nearest rural locality.
