= Nizhnegerasimovsky =

Nizhnegerasimovsky Нижнегерасимовский
- Khutor
- Location within Volgograd Oblast Location within Russia
- Coordinates: 49°00′N 43°54′E
- Country: Russia
- Region: Volgograd Oblast
- District: Ilovlinsky District
- Time zone: UTC+4:00

Nizhnegerasimovsky (Russian: Нижнегерасимовский) is a rural locality (a khutor) in Tryokhostrovskoye Rural Settlement, Ilovlinsky District, Volgograd Oblast, Russia. The population was 52 as of 2010. There are 7 streets.

== Geography ==
Nizhnegerasimovsky is located in steppe, on the Don River, on south of the Volga Upland, 53 km south of Ilovlya (the district's administrative centre) by road. Donskoy is the nearest rural locality.
