= Zheltukhino-Shiryaysky =

Zheltukhino-Shiryaysky Желтухино-Ширяйский
- Khutor
- Location within Volgograd Oblast Location within Russia
- Coordinates: 49°32′N 44°06′E
- Country: Russia
- Region: Volgograd Oblast
- District: Ilovlinsky District
- Time zone: UTC+4:00

Zheltukhino-Shiryaysky (Russian: Желтухино-Ширяйский) is a rural locality (a khutor) in Shiryayevskoye Rural Settlement, Ilovlinsky District, Volgograd Oblast, Russia. The population was 290 as of 2010. There are 5 streets.

== Geography ==
Zheltukhino-Shiryaysky is located in steppe, on the Shiryay River, on the Volga Upland, 49 km northeast of Ilovlya (the district's administrative centre) by road. Shiryayevsky is the nearest rural locality.
