= Vikhlyantsevo =

Vikhlyantsevo Вихлянцево
- Selo
- Location within Volgograd Oblast Location within Russia
- Coordinates: 50°00′N 45°17′E
- Country: Russia
- Region: Volgograd Oblast
- District: Kamyshinsky District
- Time zone: UTC+4:00

Vikhlyantsevo (Russian: Вихлянцево) is a rural locality (a selo) and the administrative center of Sestrenskoye Rural Settlement, Kamyshinsky District, Volgograd Oblast, Russia. The population was 1,103 as of 2010. There are 9 streets.

== Geography ==
Vikhlyantsevo is located in steppe, on the Volga Upland, on the Vikhlyantseva River, 17 km southwest of Kamyshin (the district's administrative centre) by road. Ionov is the nearest rural locality.
