= Tikhomirovka =

Tikhomirovka Тихомировка
- Selo
- Location within Volgograd Oblast Location within Russia
- Coordinates: 50°15′N 45°18′E
- Country: Russia
- Region: Volgograd Oblast
- District: Kamyshinsky District
- Time zone: UTC+4:00

Tikhomirovka (Russian: Тихомировка) is a rural locality (a selo) in Michurinskoye Rural Settlement, Kamyshinsky District, Volgograd Oblast, Russia. The population was 38 as of 2010.

== Geography ==
Tikhomirovka is located on the Volga Upland, on the right bank of the Ilovlya River, 31 km north of Kamyshin (the district's administrative centre) by road. Umet is the nearest rural locality.
