= Verkhnyaya Dobrinka, Kamyshinsky District, Volgograd Oblast =

Verkhnyaya Dobrinka Верхняя Добринка
- Selo
- Location within Volgograd Oblast Location within Russia
- Coordinates: 50°22′N 45°39′E
- Country: Russia
- Region: Volgograd Oblast
- District: Kamyshinsky District
- Time zone: UTC+4:00

Verkhnyaya Dobrinka (Russian: Верхняя Добринка) is a rural locality (a selo) and the administrative center of Verkhnedobrinskoye Rural Settlement, Kamyshinsky District, Volgograd Oblast, Russia. The population was 1,261 as of 2010. There are 14 streets.

== Geography ==
Verkhnyaya Dobrinka is located in the forest steppe, on the Volga Upland, 41 km northeast of Kamyshin (the district's administrative centre) by road. Nizhnyaya Dobrinka is the nearest rural locality.
