= Yablonsky, Volgograd Oblast =

Yablonsky Яблонский
- Khutor
- Location within Volgograd Oblast Location within Russia
- Coordinates: 49°20′N 43°35′E
- Country: Russia
- Region: Volgograd Oblast
- District: Ilovlinsky District
- Time zone: UTC+4:00

Yablonsky (Russian: Яблонский) is a rural locality (a khutor) in Novogrigoryevskoye Rural Settlement, Ilovlinsky District, Volgograd Oblast, Russia. The population was 63 as of 2010.

== Geography ==
Yablonsky is located in steppe, on south of Volga Upland, 50 km west of Ilovlya (the district's administrative centre) by road. Starogrigoryevskaya is the nearest rural locality.
