= Zavarygin =

Zavarygin Заварыгин
- Khutor
- Location within Volgograd Oblast Location within Russia
- Coordinates: 49°13′N 44°12′E
- Country: Russia
- Region: Volgograd Oblast
- District: Ilovlinsky District
- Time zone: UTC+4:00

Zavarygin (Russian: Заварыгин) is a rural locality (a khutor) in Medvedevskoye Rural Settlement, Ilovlinsky District, Volgograd Oblast, Russia. The population was 113 as of 2010. There are 2 streets.

== Geography ==
Zavarygin is located in steppe, on Volga Upland, on the left bank of the Tishanka River, 35 km southeast of Ilovlya (the district's administrative centre) by road. Medvedev is the nearest rural locality.
