= Karpunin =

Karpunin Карпунин
- Khutor
- Location within Volgograd Oblast Location within Russia
- Coordinates: 50°06′N 45°19′E
- Country: Russia
- Region: Volgograd Oblast
- District: Kamyshinsky District
- Time zone: UTC+4:00

Karpunin (Russian: Карпунин) is a rural locality (a khutor) in Lebyazhenskoye Rural Settlement, Kamyshinsky District, Volgograd Oblast, Russia. The population was 164 as of 2010. There are 6 streets.

== Geography ==
Karpunin is located in steppe, on the Volga Upland, on the Kamyshinka River, 9 km northwest of Kamyshin (the district's administrative centre) by road. Sredyaya Kamyshinka is the nearest rural locality.
