= Chernozubovka =

Chernozubovka Чернозубовка
- Selo
- Location within Volgograd Oblast Location within Russia
- Coordinates: 49°29′N 44°15′E
- Country: Russia
- Region: Volgograd Oblast
- District: Ilovlinsky District
- Time zone: UTC+4:00

Chernozubovka (Russian: Чернозубовка) is a rural locality (a selo) in Kondrashovskoye Rural Settlement, Ilovlinsky District, Volgograd Oblast, Russia. The population was 289 as of 2010. There are 7 streets.

== Geography ==
Chernozubovka is located in steppe, on the left bank of the Berdiya River, on the Volga Upland, 30 km northeast of Ilovlya (the district's administrative centre) by road. Berdiya is the nearest rural locality.
