= Verkhnyaya Gryaznukha =

Verkhnyaya Gryaznukha Верхняя Грязнуха
- Selo
- Location within Volgograd Oblast Location within Russia
- Coordinates: 50°28′N 45°28′E
- Country: Russia
- Region: Volgograd Oblast
- District: Kamyshinsky District
- Time zone: UTC+4:00

Verkhnyaya Gryaznukha (Russian: Верхняя Грязнуха) is a rural locality (a selo) in Ust-Gryaznukhinskoye Rural Settlement, Kamyshinsky District, Volgograd Oblast, Russia. The population was 532 as of 2010. There are 3 streets.

== Geography ==
Verkhnyaya Gryaznukha is located in steppe, on the Volga Upland, on the left bank of the Gryaznukha River, 52 km north of Kamyshin (the district's administrative centre) by road. Ust-Gryaznikha is the nearest rural locality.
