= Borovki =

Borovki Боровки
- Khutor
- Location within Volgograd Oblast Location within Russia
- Coordinates: 49°23′N 44°01′E
- Country: Russia
- Region: Volgograd Oblast
- District: Ilovlinsky District
- Time zone: UTC+4:00

Borovki (Russian: Боровки) is a rural locality (a khutor) in Avilovskoye Rural Settlement, Ilovlinsky District, Volgograd Oblast, Russia. The population was 127 as of 2010. There are 5 streets.

== Geography ==
Borovki is located in steppe, on the Volga Upland, 15 km north of Ilovlya (the district's administrative centre) by road. Avilov is the nearest rural locality.
