= Dvoryanskoye =

Dvoryanskoye Дворянское
- Selo
- Location within Volgograd Oblast Location within Russia
- Coordinates: 50°14′N 45°16′E
- Country: Russia
- Region: Volgograd Oblast
- District: Kamyshinsky District
- Time zone: UTC+4:00

Dvoryanskoye (Russian: Дворянское) is a rural locality (a selo) in Michurinskoye Rural Settlement, Kamyshinsky District, Volgograd Oblast, Russia. The population was 2,086 as of 2010. There are 8 streets.

== Geography ==
Dvoryanskoye is located on the Volga Upland, on the left bank of the Ilovlya River, 23 km northwest of Kamyshin (the district's administrative centre) by road. Veselovo is the nearest rural locality.
