= Yelshanka =

Yelshanka Ельшанка
- Selo
- Location within Volgograd Oblast Location within Russia
- Coordinates: 50°09′N 45°23′E
- Country: Russia
- Region: Volgograd Oblast
- District: Kamyshinsky District
- Time zone: UTC+4:00

Yelshanka (Russian: Ельшанка) is a rural locality (a selo) in Michurinskoye Rural Settlement, Kamyshinsky District, Volgograd Oblast, Russia. The population was 278 as of 2010. There are 13 streets.

== Geography ==
Yelshanka is located on the Volga Upland, on the Yelshanka River, 13 km north of Kamyshin (the district's administrative centre) by road. Michurinsky is the nearest rural locality.
