= Verkhnyaya Kulaninka =

Verkhnyaya Kulaninka Верхняя Куланинка
- Selo
- Location within Volgograd Oblast Location within Russia
- Coordinates: 50°25′N 45°41′E
- Country: Russia
- Region: Volgograd Oblast
- District: Kamyshinsky District
- Time zone: UTC+4:00

Verkhnyaya Kulaninka (Russian: Верхняя Куланинка) is a rural locality (a selo) in Vodnobuyerachnoye Rural Settlement, Kamyshinsky District, Volgograd Oblast, Russia. The population was 178 as of 2010. There are 6 streets.

== Geography ==
Verkhnyaya Kulaninka is located on the Volga Upland, 49 km northeast of Kamyshin (the district's administrative centre) by road. Verkhnyaya Dobrinka is the nearest rural locality.
