= Ust-Gryaznukha =

Ust-Gryaznukha Усть-Грязнуха
- Selo
- Location within Volgograd Oblast Location within Russia
- Coordinates: 50°28′N 45°25′E
- Country: Russia
- Region: Volgograd Oblast
- District: Kamyshinsky District
- Time zone: UTC+4:00

Ust-Gryaznukha (Russian: Усть-Грязнуха) is a rural locality (a selo) and the administrative center of Ust-Gryaznukhinskoye Rural Settlement, Kamyshinsky District, Volgograd Oblast, Russia. The population was 856 as of 2010, in the 14 streets that make up the centre.

== Geography ==
Ust-Gryaznukha is located in forest steppe, on the Volga Upland, on the right bank of the Gryaznukha River, 51 km north of Kamyshin (the district's administrative centre) by road. Verkhnyaya Gryaznukha is the nearest rural locality.
