= Gryaznukha, Kamyshinsky District, Volgograd Oblast =

Gryaznukha Грязнуха
- Khutor
- Location within Volgograd Oblast Location within Russia
- Coordinates: 50°07′N 45°14′E
- Country: Russia
- Region: Volgograd Oblast
- District: Kamyshinsky District
- Time zone: UTC+4:00

Gryaznukha (Russian: Грязнуха) is a rural locality (a khutor) in Lebyazhenskoye Rural Settlement, Kamyshinsky District, Volgograd Oblast, Russia. The population was 79 as of 2010. There are 5 streets.

== Geography ==
Gryaznukha is located on the Volga Upland, on the Kamyshinka River, 15 km northwest of Kamyshin (the district's administrative centre) by road. Srednyaya Kamyshinka is the nearest rural locality.
