= Verkhnyaya Lipovka =

Verkhnyaya Lipovka Верхняя Липовка
- Selo
- Location within Volgograd Oblast Location within Russia
- Coordinates: 50°10′N 45°27′E
- Country: Russia
- Region: Volgograd Oblast
- District: Kamyshinsky District
- Time zone: UTC+4:00

Verkhnyaya Lipovka (Russian: Верхняя Липовка) is a rural locality (a selo) in Ternovskoye Rural Settlement, Kamyshinsky District, Volgograd Oblast, Russia. The population was 351 as of 2010. There are 7 streets.

== Geography ==
Verkhnyaya Lipovka is located in forest steppe, on the Volga Upland, on the Lipovka River, 15 km northeast of Kamyshin (the district's administrative centre) by road. Nizhnyaya Lipovka is the nearest rural locality.
