= Vodnobuyerachnoye =

Vodnobuyerachnoye Воднобуерачное
- Selo
- Location within Volgograd Oblast Location within Russia
- Coordinates: 50°32′N 45°38′E
- Country: Russia
- Region: Volgograd Oblast
- District: Kamyshinsky District
- Time zone: UTC+4:00

Vodnobuyerachnoye (Russian: Воднобуерачное) is a rural locality (a selo) and the administrative center of Vodnobuyerachnoye Rural Settlement, Kamyshinsky District, Volgograd Oblast, Russia. The population was 1,071 as of 2010. There are 10 streets.

== Geography ==
Vodnobuyerachnoye is located in forest steppe, on the Volga Upland, 64 km northeast of Kamyshin (the district's administrative centre) by road. Verkhnyaya Kulaninka is the nearest rural locality.
