= Baybayev =

Baybayev Байбаев
- Khutor
- Location within Volgograd Oblast Location within Russia
- Coordinates: 49°10′N 44°02′E
- Country: Russia
- Region: Volgograd Oblast
- District: Ilovlinsky District
- Time zone: UTC+4:00

Baybayev (Russian: Байбаев) is a rural locality (a khutor) in Krasnodonskoye Rural Settlement, Ilovlinsky District, Volgograd Oblast, Russia. The population was 47 as of 2010. There are 10 streets.

== Geography ==
Baybayev is located in steppe, on the bank of the Don River, on south of the Volga Upland, 25 km south of Ilovlya (the district's administrative centre) by road. Krasnodonsky is the nearest rural locality.
