= Bolshaya Ivanovka =

Bolshaya Ivanovka Большая Ивановка
- Selo
- Location within Volgograd Oblast Location within Russia
- Coordinates: 49°27′N 44°20′E
- Country: Russia
- Region: Volgograd Oblast
- District: Ilovlinsky District
- Time zone: UTC+4:00

Bolshaya Ivanovka (Russian: Больша́я Ива́новка) is a rural locality (a selo) and the administrative center of Bolsheivanovskoye Rural Settlement, Ilovlinsky District, Volgograd Oblast, Russia. The population was 1,014 as of 2010. There are 10 streets.

== Geography ==
Bolshaya Ivanovka is located in steppe, on the left bank of the Berdiya River, on the Volga Upland, 37 km northeast of Ilovlya (the district's administrative centre) by road. Berdiya is the nearest rural locality.
