= Krasnodonsky =

Krasnodonsky Краснодонский
- Khutor
- Location within Volgograd Oblast Location within Russia
- Coordinates: 49°11′N 44°04′E
- Country: Russia
- Region: Volgograd Oblast
- District: Ilovlinsky District
- Time zone: UTC+4:00

Krasnodonsky (Russian: Краснодонский) is a rural locality (a khutor) and the administrative center of Krasnodonskoye Rural Settlement, Ilovlinsky District, Volgograd Oblast, Russia. The population was 939 as of 2010. There are 17 streets.

== Geography ==
Krasnodonsky is located in steppe, on the right bank of the Tishanka River, on south of the Volga Upland, 21 km southeast of Ilovlya (the district's administrative centre) by road. Kuznetsov is the nearest rural locality.
