= Nizhnyaya Lipovka =

Nizhnyaya Lipovka Нижняя Липовка
- Selo
- Location within Volgograd Oblast Location within Russia
- Coordinates: 50°10′N 45°27′E
- Country: Russia
- Region: Volgograd Oblast
- District: Kamyshinsky District
- Time zone: UTC+3:00

Nizhnyaya Lipovka (Russian: Нижняя Липовка) is a rural locality (a selo) in Ternovskoye Rural Settlement, Kamyshinsky District, Volgograd Oblast, Russia. The population was 14 as of 2010.

== Geography ==
Nizhnyaya Lipovka is located in forest steppe, on the Volga Upland, on the west bank of the Volgograd Reservoir, 15 km northeast of Kamyshin (the district's administrative centre) by road. Ternovka is the nearest rural locality.
