= Petrunino, Volgograd Oblast =

Petrunino Петрунино
- Selo
- Location within Volgograd Oblast Location within Russia
- Coordinates: 50°05′N 45°04′E
- Country: Russia
- Region: Volgograd Oblast
- District: Kamyshinsky District
- Time zone: UTC+4:00

Petrunino (Russian: Петрунино) is a rural locality (a selo) and the administrative center of Petruninskoye Rural Settlement, Kamyshinsky District, Volgograd Oblast, Russia. The population was 942 as of 2010. There are 15 streets.

== Geography ==
Petrunino is located on the Volga Upland, on the Ilovlya River, 33 km west of Kamyshin (the district's administrative centre) by road. Baranovka is the nearest rural locality.

== History ==
Founded in the second half of the 18th century. Petrunino consisted of two communities - the farms of the Big and Small Petrunins. Big Petrunin was settled by Little Russians, Small - by Great Russians. Big Petrunin was located on the right bank of the Ilovlya, Small - on the right. Both farms belonged to the Kamyshinsky district of the Saratov province.

Since 1928, as part of the Sestrensky Village Council of the Kamyshinsky District of the Kamyshinsky District (the district was liquidated in 1934) of the Nizhnevolzhsky Territory (since 1935 - the Stalingrad Territory, since 1936 - the Stalingrad Region, since 1961 - the Volgograd Region).

== Climate ==
The climate is temperate continental (according to the Köppen climate classification - Dfa). The long-term rainfall rate is 400 mm. The greatest amount of precipitation falls in July - 48 mm, the least in March - 22 mm. The average annual temperature is positive and is + 7.0 °С, the average temperature of the coldest month of January is −9.4 °С, the hottest month of July is +22.9 °С.
