= Traktirsky =

Traktirsky Трактирский
- Khutor
- Location within Volgograd Oblast Location within Russia
- Coordinates: 49°28′N 43°46′E
- Country: Russia
- Region: Volgograd Oblast
- District: Ilovlinsky District
- Time zone: UTC+4:00

Traktirsky (Russian: Трактирский) is a rural locality (a khutor) in Logovskoye Rural Settlement, Ilovlinsky District, Volgograd Oblast, Russia. The population was 2 as of 2010.

== Geography ==
Traktirsky is located in steppe, on south of Volga Upland, 31 km northwest of Ilovlya (the district's administrative centre) by road. Log is the nearest rural locality.
