= Pisaryovka =

Pisaryovka Писарёвка
- Khutor
- Location within Volgograd Oblast Location within Russia
- Coordinates: 49°28′N 44°11′E
- Country: Russia
- Region: Volgograd Oblast
- District: Ilovlinsky District
- Time zone: UTC+4:00

Pisaryovka (Russian: Писарёвка) is a rural locality (a khutor) in Kondrashovskoye Rural Settlement, Ilovlinsky District, Volgograd Oblast, Russia. The population was 382 as of 2010. There are 8 streets.

== Geography ==
Pisaryovka is located in steppe, on the banks of the Shiryay River, on the Volga Upland, 28 km northeast of Ilovlya (the district's administrative centre) by road. Alikovka is the nearest rural locality.
