= Chukhonastovka =

Chukhonastovka Чухонастовка
- Selo
- Location within Volgograd Oblast Location within Russia
- Coordinates: 49°51′N 45°06′E
- Country: Russia
- Region: Volgograd Oblast
- District: Kamyshinsky District
- Time zone: UTC+4:00

Chukhonastovka (Russian: Чухонастовка) is a rural locality (a selo) and the administrative center of Chukhonastovskoye Rural Settlement, Kamyshinsky District, Volgograd Oblast, Russia. The population was 531 as of 2010. There are 14 streets.

== Geography ==
Chukhonastovka is located in forest steppe, on the Volga Upland, on the bank of the Balykleyka River, 48 km southwest of Kamyshin (the district's administrative centre) by road. Talovka is the nearest rural locality.
