= Gosselekstantsiya =

Gosselekstantsiya Госселекстанция
- Settlement
- Location within Volgograd Oblast Location within Russia
- Coordinates: 50°01′N 45°07′E
- Country: Russia
- Region: Volgograd Oblast
- District: Kamyshinsky District
- Time zone: UTC+4:00

Gosselekstantsiya (Russian: Госселекстанция) is a rural locality (a settlement) and the administrative center of Belogorskoye Rural Settlement, Kamyshinsky District, Volgograd Oblast, Russia. The population was 883 as of 2010. There are 11 streets.

== Geography ==
Gosselekstantsiya is located in forest steppe, on the Volga Upland, 25 km southwest of Kamyshin (the district's administrative centre) by road. Popovka is the nearest rural locality.
