= Talovka, Kamyshinsky District, Volgograd Oblast =

Talovka Таловка
- Selo
- Location within Volgograd Oblast Location within Russia
- Coordinates: 49°58′N 45°02′E
- Country: Russia
- Region: Volgograd Oblast
- District: Kamyshinsky District
- Time zone: UTC+4:00

Talovka (Russian: Таловка) is a rural locality (a selo) and the administrative center of Talovskoye Rural Settlement, Kamyshinsky District, Volgograd Oblast, Russia. The population was 1,395 as of 2010. There are 17 streets.

== Geography ==
Talovka is located in steppe, on the Volga Upland, 40 km southwest of Kamyshin (the district's administrative centre) by road. Gosselekstantsiya is the nearest rural locality.
