= Kuznetsov, Volgograd Oblast =

Kuznetsov Кузнецов
- Khutor
- Location within Volgograd Oblast Location within Russia
- Coordinates: 49°10′N 44°04′E
- Country: Russia
- Region: Volgograd Oblast
- District: Ilovlinsky District
- Time zone: UTC+4:00

Kuznetsov (Russian: Кузнецов) is a rural locality (a khutor) in Krasnodonskoye Rural Settlement, Ilovlinsky District, Volgograd Oblast, Russia. The population was 335 as of 2010. There are 7 streets.

== Geography ==
Kuznetsov is located in steppe, on the left bank of the Tishanka River, on the Volga Upland, 24 km southeast of Ilovlya (the district's administrative centre) by road. Krasnodonsky is the nearest rural locality.
