= Popovka, Volgograd Oblast =

Popovka Поповка
- Khutor
- Location within Volgograd Oblast Location within Russia
- Coordinates: 50°02′N 45°18′E
- Country: Russia
- Region: Volgograd Oblast
- District: Kamyshinsky District
- Time zone: UTC+4:00

Popovka (Russian: Поповка) is a rural locality (a khutor) in Sestrenskoye Rural Settlement, Kamyshinsky District, Volgograd Oblast, Russia. The population was 125 as of 2010. There are 13 streets.

== Geography ==
Popovka is located in steppe, on the Volga Upland, on the Panfetyeva River, 13 km southwest of Kamyshin (the district's administrative centre) by road. Vikhlyantsevo is the nearest rural locality.
