= Shokhinsky =

Shokhinsky Шохинский
- Khutor
- Location within Volgograd Oblast Location within Russia
- Coordinates: 49°16′N 43°33′E
- Country: Russia
- Region: Volgograd Oblast
- District: Ilovlinsky District
- Time zone: UTC+4:00

Shokhinsky (Russian: Шохинский) is a rural locality (a khutor) in Sirotinskoye Rural Settlement, Ilovlinsky District, Volgograd Oblast, Russia. The population was 208 as of 2010. There are 2 streets.

== Geography ==
Shokhinsky is located in forest steppe, between Don, Ilovlya and Volga Rivers, on south of the Volga Upland, 58 km west of Ilovlya (the district's administrative centre) by road. Kamyshinsky is the nearest rural locality.
