= Butkovka =

Butkovka Бутковка
- Selo
- Location within Volgograd Oblast Location within Russia
- Coordinates: 50°25′N 45°51′E
- Country: Russia
- Region: Volgograd Oblast
- District: Kamyshinsky District
- Time zone: UTC+4:00

Butkovka (Russian: Бутковка) is a rural locality (a selo) in Vodnobuyerachnoye Rural Settlement, Kamyshinsky District, Volgograd Oblast, Russia. The population was 44 as of 2010.

== Geography ==
Butkovka is located on the Volga Upland, on the west bank of the Volgograd Reservoir, 63 km northeast of Kamyshin (the district's administrative centre) by road. Galka is the nearest rural locality.
