= Starodonskoy =

Starodonskoy Стародонской
- Khutor
- Location within Volgograd Oblast Location within Russia
- Coordinates: 49°20′N 43°42′E
- Country: Russia
- Region: Volgograd Oblast
- District: Ilovlinsky District
- Time zone: UTC+4:00

Starodonskoy (Russian: Стародонской) is a rural locality (a khutor) in Ozerskoye Rural Settlement, Ilovlinsky District, Volgograd Oblast, Russia. The population was 31 as of 2010. There are 4 streets.

== Geography ==
Starodonskoy is located in steppe, on the Don River, on south of the Volga Upland, 43 km west of Ilovlya (the district's administrative centre) by road. Beluzhino-Koldairov is the nearest rural locality.
