= Salomatino =

Salomatino Саломатино
- Settlement
- Location within Volgograd Oblast Location within Russia
- Coordinates: 50°01′N 44°53′E
- Country: Russia
- Region: Volgograd Oblast
- District: Kamyshinsky District
- Time zone: UTC+4:00

Salomatino (Russian: Саломатино) is a rural locality (a settlement) in Salomatinskoye Rural Settlement, Kamyshinsky District, Volgograd Oblast, Russia. The population was 23 as of 2010.

== Geography ==
Salomatino is located 38 km west of Kamyshin (the district's administrative centre) by road. Salomatino (selo) is the nearest rural locality.
