= Viltov =

Viltov Вилтов
- Khutor
- Location within Volgograd Oblast Location within Russia
- Coordinates: 49°26′N 43°41′E
- Country: Russia
- Region: Volgograd Oblast
- District: Ilovlinsky District
- Time zone: UTC+4:00

Viltov (Russian: Вилтов) is a rural locality (a khutor) in Logovskoye Rural Settlement, Ilovlinsky District, Volgograd Oblast, Russia. The population was 178 as of 2010. There are 5 streets.

== Geography ==
Viltov is located in steppe, 36 km northwest of Ilovlya (the district's administrative centre) by road. Novogrigoryevskaya is the nearest rural locality.
