= Starogrigoryevskaya =

Starogrigoryevskaya Старогригорьевская
- Stanitsa
- Location within Volgograd Oblast Location within Russia
- Coordinates: 49°21′N 43°37′E
- Country: Russia
- Region: Volgograd Oblast
- District: Ilovlinsky District
- Time zone: UTC+4:00

Starogrigoryevskaya (Russian: Старогригорьевская) is a rural locality (a stanitsa) in Novogrigoryevskoye Rural Settlement, Ilovlinsky District, Volgograd Oblast, Russia. The population was 192 as of 2010.

== Geography ==
Starogrigoryevskaya is located 5 km from the right bank of the Don River, 47 km northwest of Ilovlya (the district's administrative centre) by road. Novogrigoryevskaya is the nearest rural locality.
