= Kachalino =

Kachalino Качалино
- Settlement
- Location within Volgograd Oblast Location within Russia
- Coordinates: 49°07′N 44°03′E
- Country: Russia
- Region: Volgograd Oblast
- District: Ilovlinsky District
- Time zone: UTC+4:00

Kachalino (Russian: Качалино) is a rural locality (a settlement) and the administrative center of Kachalinskoye Rural Settlement, Ilovlinsky District, Volgograd Oblast, Russia. The population was 2,304 as of 2010. There are 24 streets.

== Geography ==
The village is located on the Volga Upland, 65 km from Volgograd and 37 km from Ilovlya.
