= Khmelevskoy =

Khmelevskoy Хмелевской
- Khutor
- Location within Volgograd Oblast Location within Russia
- Coordinates: 49°11′N 43°42′E
- Country: Russia
- Region: Volgograd Oblast
- District: Ilovlinsky District
- Time zone: UTC+4:00

Khmelevskoy (Russian: Хмелевской) is a rural locality (a khutor) in Sirotinskoye Rural Settlement, Ilovlinsky District, Volgograd Oblast, Russia. The population was 74 as of 2010. There are 4 streets.

== Geography ==
Khmelevskoy is located in steppe, on the Don River, on south of the Volga Upland, 81 km southwest of Ilovlya (the district's administrative centre) by road. Sirotinskaya is the nearest rural locality.
