= Berdiya =

Berdiya Бердия
- Settlement
- Location within Volgograd Oblast Location within Russia
- Coordinates: 49°28′N 44°15′E
- Country: Russia
- Region: Volgograd Oblast
- District: Ilovlinsky District
- Time zone: UTC+4:00

Berdiya (Russian: Бердия) is a rural locality (a settlement) in Kondrashovskoye Rural Settlement, Ilovlinsky District, Volgograd Oblast, Russia. The population was 180 as of 2010. There are 4 streets.

== Geography ==
Berdiya is located 34 km northeast of Ilovlya (the district's administrative centre) by road. Chernozubovka is the nearest rural locality.
