= Nizhnyaya Dobrinka, Kamyshinsky District, Volgograd Oblast =

Nizhnyaya Dobrinka Нижняя Добринка
- Selo
- Location within Volgograd Oblast Location within Russia
- Coordinates: 50°18′N 45°42′E
- Country: Russia
- Region: Volgograd Oblast
- District: Kamyshinsky District
- Time zone: UTC+4:00

Nizhnyaya Dobrinka (Russian: Нижняя Добринка) is a rural locality (a selo) and the administrative center of Michurinskoye Rural Settlement, Kamyshinsky District, Volgograd Oblast, Russia. The population was 1,091 as of 2010. There are 11 streets.

== Geography ==
Nizhnyaya Dobrinka is located on the right bank of the Dobrinka River, 47 km northeast of Kamyshin (the district's administrative centre) by road. Verkhnyaya Dobrinka is the nearest rural locality.
