= Medvedev, Volgograd Oblast =

Medvedev Медведев
- Khutor
- Location within Volgograd Oblast Location within Russia
- Coordinates: 49°13′N 44°14′E
- Country: Russia
- Region: Volgograd Oblast
- District: Ilovlinsky District
- Time zone: UTC+4:00

Medvedev (Russian: Медведев) is a rural locality (a khutor) and the administrative center of Medvedevskoye Rural Settlement, Ilovlinsky District, Volgograd Oblast, Russia. The population was 1,255 as of 2010. There are 14 streets.

== Geography ==
Medvedev is located on the banks of the Tishanka River, 37 km southeast of Ilovlya (the district's administrative centre) by road. Obilny is the nearest rural locality.
