= Panovka, Volgograd Oblast =

Panovka Пановка
- Selo
- Location within Volgograd Oblast Location within Russia
- Coordinates: 50°35′N 45°24′E
- Country: Russia
- Region: Volgograd Oblast
- District: Kamyshinsky District
- Time zone: UTC+4:00

Panovka (Russian: Пановка) is a rural locality (a selo) in Ust-Gryaznukhinskoye Rural Settlement, Kamyshinsky District, Volgograd Oblast, Russia. The population was 234 as of 2010. There are 4 streets.

== Geography ==
Panovka is located on the right bank of the Volga River, 68 km north of Kamyshin (the district's administrative centre) by road. Gvardeyskoye is the nearest rural locality.
