= Antipovka =

Antipovka Антиповка
- Selo
- Location within Volgograd Oblast Location within Russia
- Coordinates: 49°49′N 45°18′E
- Country: Russia
- Region: Volgograd Oblast
- District: Kamyshinsky District
- Time zone: UTC+4:00

Antipovka (Russian: Анти́повка) is a rural locality (a selo) and the administrative center of Antipovskoye Rural Settlement, Kamyshinsky District, Volgograd Oblast, Russia. The population was 2,905 as of 2010. There are 33 streets.

== Geography ==
Antipovka is located on the right bank of the Volgograd Reservoir, 45 km south of Kamyshin (the district's administrative centre) by road. Bykovo is the nearest rural locality.
