= Yeretsky =

Yeretsky Ерецкий
- Khutor
- Location within Volgograd Oblast Location within Russia
- Coordinates: 49°13′N 43°49′E
- Country: Russia
- Region: Volgograd Oblast
- District: Ilovlinsky District
- Time zone: UTC+4:00

Yeretsky (Russian: Ерецкий) is a rural locality (a khutor) in Avilovskoye Rural Settlement, Ilovlinsky District, Volgograd Oblast, Russia. The population was 24 as of 2010.

== Geography ==
Yeretsky is located on the bank of the Koldair Lake, 17 km southwest of Ilovlya (the district's administrative centre) by road. Beluzhino-Koldairov is the nearest rural locality.
