= Alikovka =

Selo in Volgograd Oblast, Russia

Alikovka Аликовка
- Selo
- Location within Volgograd Oblast Location within Russia
- Coordinates: 49°29′N 44°14′E
- Country: Russia
- Region: Volgograd Oblast
- District: Ilovlinsky District
- Time zone: UTC+4:00

Alikovka (Russian: Аликовка) is a rural locality (a selo) in Kondrashovskoye Rural Settlement, Ilovlinsky District, Volgograd Oblast, Russia. The population was 75 as of 2010.

== Geography ==
Alikovka is located in steppe, on the left bank of the Berdiya River, 32 km northeast of Ilovlya (the district's administrative centre) by road. Chernozubovka is the nearest rural locality.
