= Tryokhostrovskaya =

Tryokhostrovskaya Трёхостровская
- Stanitsa
- Location within Volgograd Oblast Location within Russia
- Coordinates: 49°05′N 43°55′E
- Country: Russia
- Region: Volgograd Oblast
- District: Ilovlinsky District
- Time zone: UTC+4:00

Tryokhostrovskaya (Russian: Трёхостровская) is a rural locality (a stanitsa) and the administrative center of Tryokhostrovskoye Rural Settlement, Ilovlinsky District, Volgograd Oblast, Russia. The population was 864 as of 2010. There are 22 streets.

== Geography ==
Tryokhostrovskaya is located in steppe, on the right bank of the Don River, 51 km south of Ilovlya (the district's administrative centre) by road. Zimoveysky is the nearest rural locality.
