= Taw yağı =

Historic region in present-day Tatarstan

Coordinates: 55°14′N 48°46′E

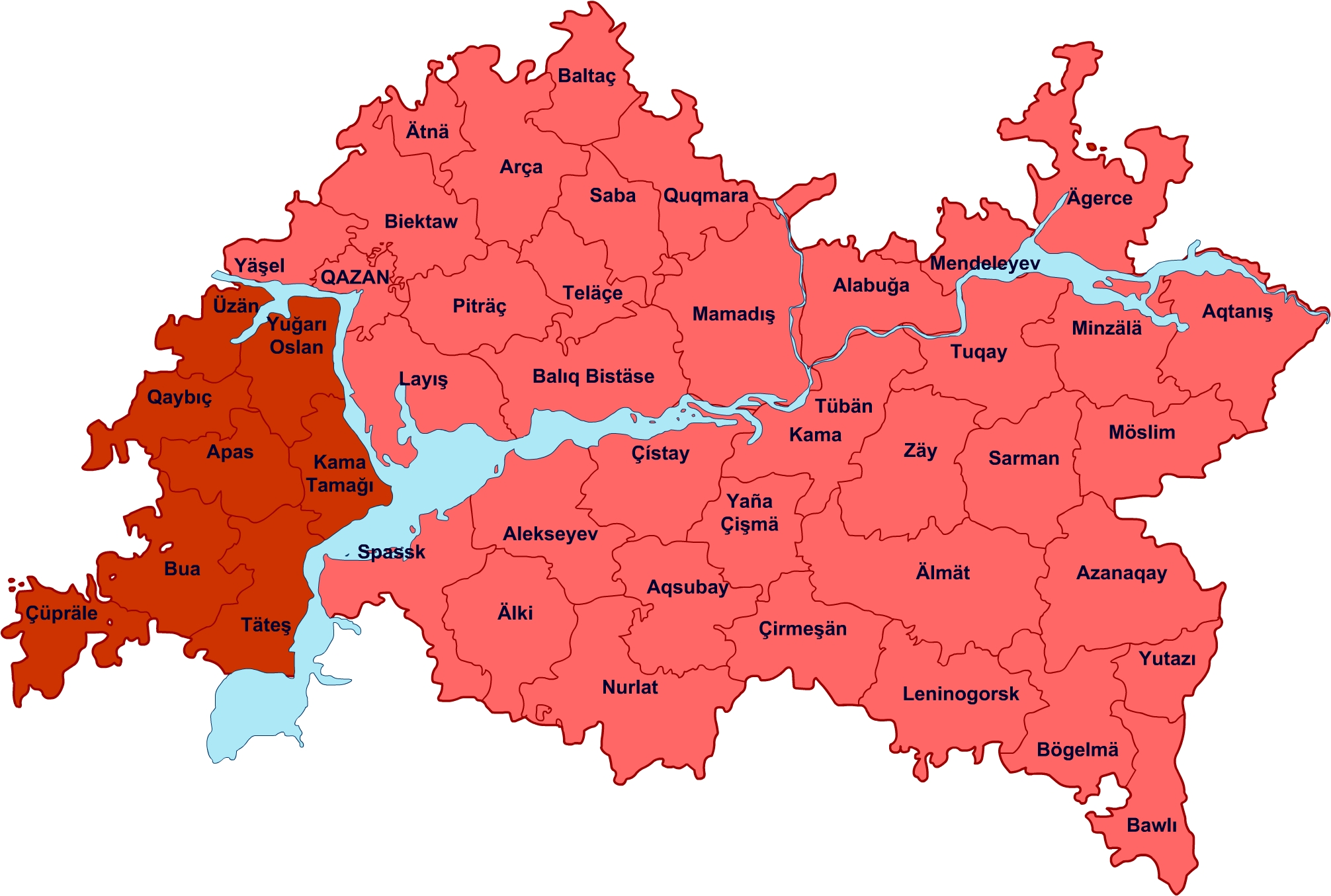
Location of Taw yağı in Tatarstan.

The Taw yağı (pronounced [tʌʊ jʌˈɣɯ] in Tatar) or Viryal (Tatar: Тау ягы, romanized: Taw yağı; Chuvash: Вирьял; Russian: Го́рная сторона́, literally Hill Bank Land) was a historical region of Tatarstan, Khanate of Kazan, Volga Bulgaria, the name is known since the 1550s. This land was situated at the Hill, i.e. right bank of the Volga. Since 1547, this region was disintegrated from the khanate. The Feudal lords of the Hill Bank Land eventually joined Russia following 1556. Sviyazhsk was established as the center of the Hill Bank Land. Later, this part of the former khanate was incorporated to Sviyazhsk Uyezd. The region had multiethnic population (Russian: горные люди) and included Tatars, Chuvashes, Hill Mari and Mordvins.

During the Russian Civil War, White guerrillas were based in the forests here.

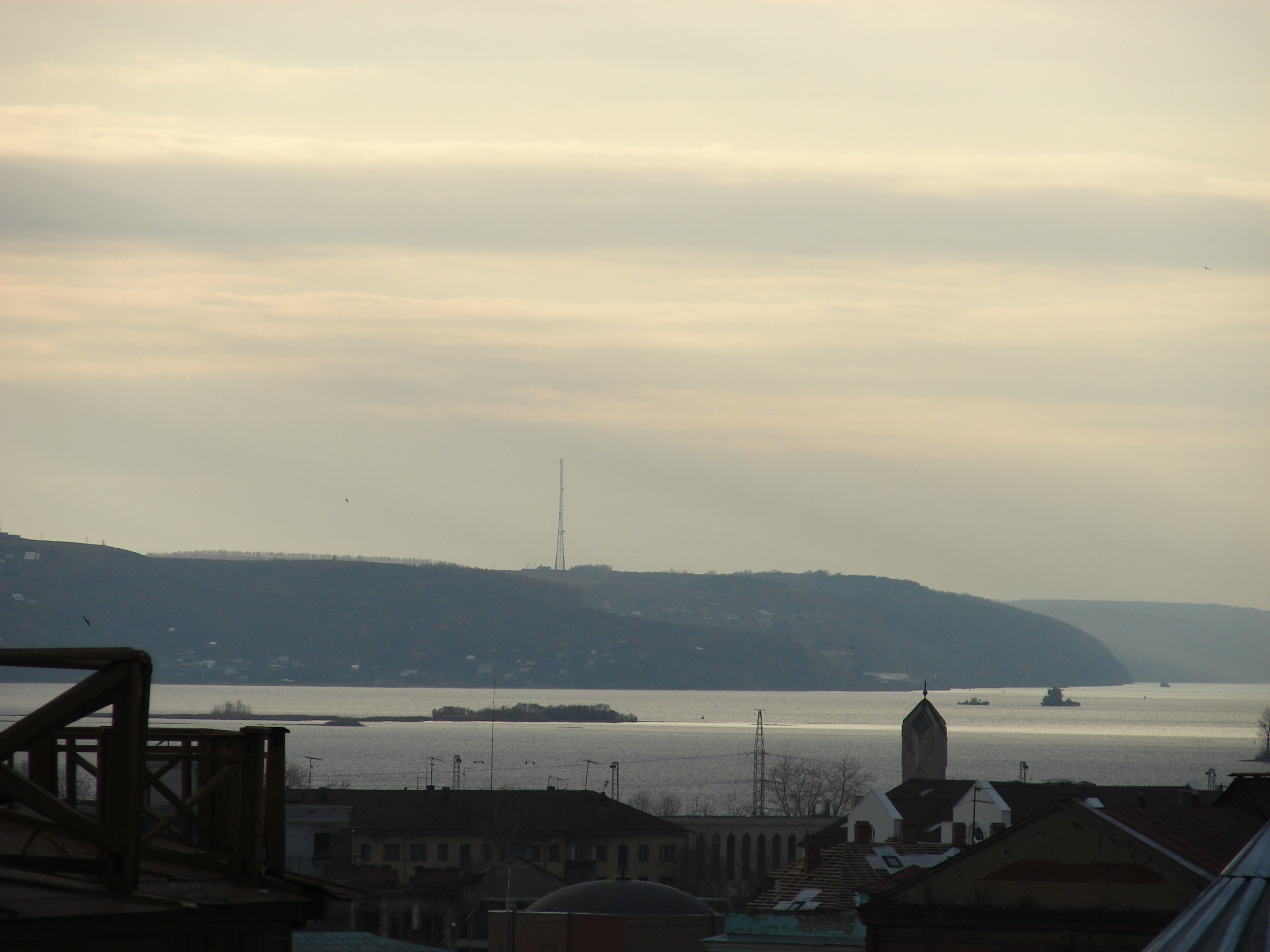
A view of the Taw yağı from Kazan.

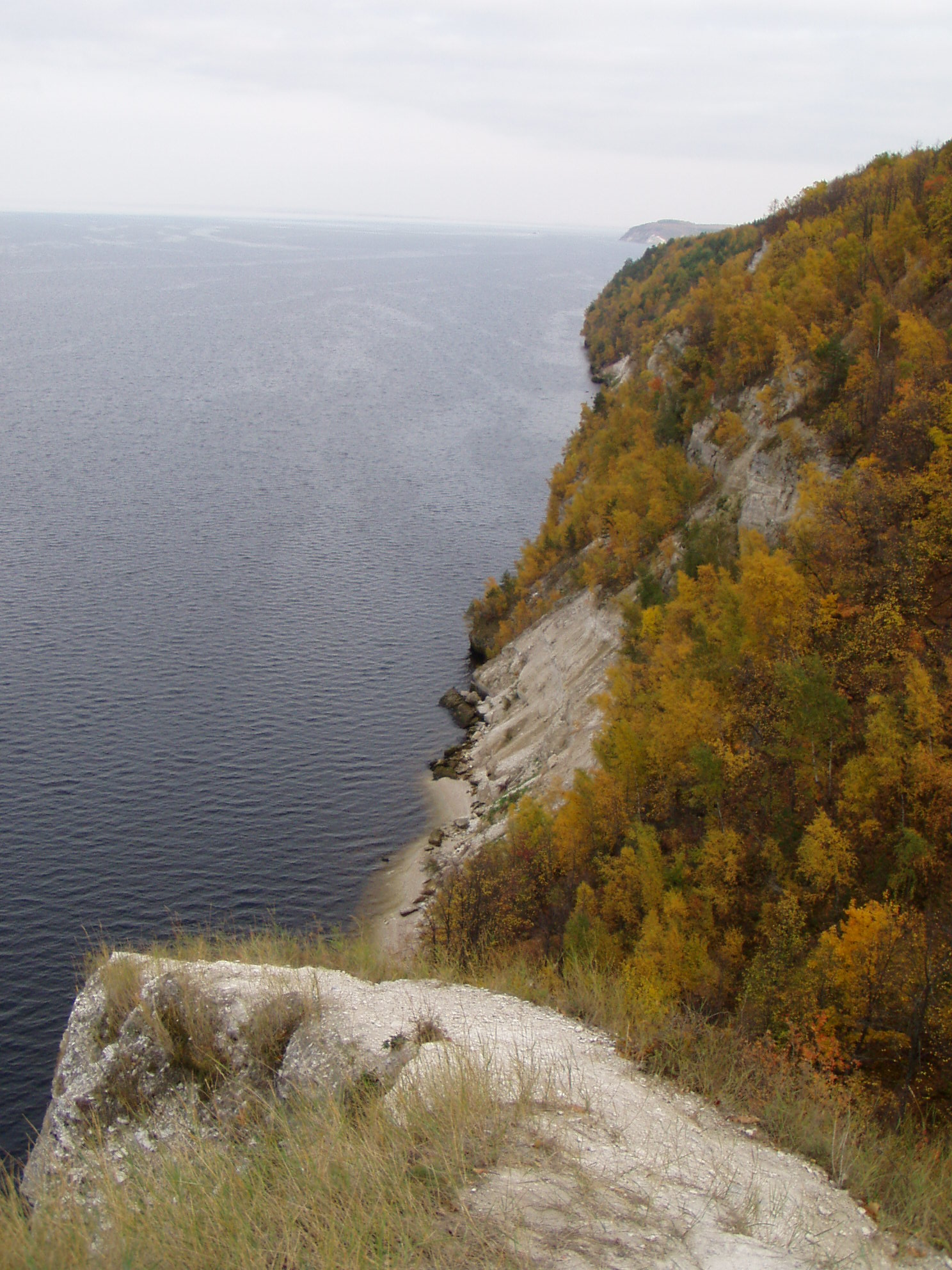
Volga has a rocky right bank.

This part of Tatarstan is well known by its rocky hills. The hills themselves became recently known for their dachas, resorts and Alpine skiing.

== See also ==
- Arça yağı
