= Arça yağı =

Arça yağı ([ʌrˈɕɑ jʌˈɣɯ], the Tatar for the Arça side; Tatar Cyrillic: Арча ягы; Russian: Арская сторона) was a historical naming for North-Western part of the Kazan Khanate after it was conquered. Unlike Taw yağı which was situated at the right bank of the Volga, it covered some left bank lands. For the most part, the possessions of Kazan nobility were placed there. After the khanate's territorial division was reformed on the Russian manner and uyezds were introduced, Arça yağı term became obsolete. The territory of Arça yağı was incorporated to the Kazan Uyezd.
