= Pavel Smurov =

Russian footballer

Personal information
- Full name: Pavel Vladimirovich Smurov
- Date of birth: 21 July 1979 (age 47)
- Place of birth: Kamyshin, Russian SFSR
- Height: 1.79 m (5 ft 10 in)
- Positions: Defender; midfielder

Senior career*
Years	Team	Apps	(Gls)
1996–1998	FC Energiya Kamyshin	22	(0)
1998–2000	FC Iskra Engels	64	(3)
2001	FC Lada-Energiya Dimitrovgrad	32	(4)
2002–2004	FC Olimpia Volgograd	91	(24)
2005	FC Khimki	23	(3)
2006	FC Spartak Nizhny Novgorod	24	(0)
2007	FC Spartak Kostroma	4	(0)
2008	FC Olimpia Volgograd	31	(7)
2009	FC Luch-Energiya Vladivostok	17	(3)
- * Club domestic league appearances and goals

Pavel Vladimirovich Smurov (Russian: Павел Владимирович Смуров; born 21 July 1979) is a former Russian professional footballer.

== Club career ==
He made his professional debut in the Russian First Division in 1997 for FC Energiya Kamyshin.

== Honours ==
- Russian Cup finalist: 2005.
