= Olexander Chyrkov =

Олександр Чирков (Александр Чирков)
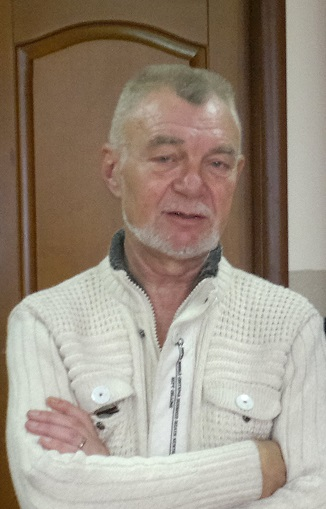
- Born: 1 November 1941; Kamyshin USSR

Olexander Chyrkov, the head of the department of Germanic Philology and Foreign Literature, the head of Scientific and Artistic Complex "Dramaturgy" of the Institute of Foreign Languages Zhytomyr Ivan Franko State University, member of the Academy of Sciences of Higher Education of Ukraine, Doctor of Philology, Professor.

Scientific interests of Professor Chyrkov are multifarious. He is a historian of literature, theater critic and specialist in drama study. He is on the editorial board of several professional journals and scientific newsletters.

Professor Chyrkov promotes and establishes relationships with leading experts who work on the problems of the theory and history of drama and problems of literary terminology. Being extremely creative it his scientific investigations, educational and translational activities and drama study he aspires to establish the right of every individual to bear his own considerations in the sphere of science, art and education.

== Works ==
- Бертольт Брехт. – К.: Знання, 1971. – 48 с.
- Традиции и новаторство в драматургии Бертольта Брехта. Автореферат диссертации на соискание ученой степени кандидата филологических наук. – К., 1972. – 24 с.
- Воскреснувши з руїн (про культуру НДР). – К.: Знання, 1974. – 35 с.
- Бертольт Брехт. Про мистецтво театру (Упорядкування, вступна стаття, коментарі і переклад). – К.:

Мистецтво, 1977. – 365 с.

- Бертольт Брехт. Життя і творчість. – К.: Дніпро, 1981. – 158 с.
- Эпическая драма (проблемы теории и поэтики). – К.: Вища школа, 1988. – 160 с.
- Эпическая драма. Проблемы теории. Поэтика. Автореферат диссертации на соискание ученой степени доктора филологических наук. – К., 1989. – 35 с.
- Драматургия восьмидесятых. Постигая время. – Житомир: Знання, 1990. – 31 с.
- Основи теорії літератури. Частина перша (у співавторстві з М. Дубиною). – К., 1997. – 63 с.
- Бертольт Брехт: театральные диалоги. – Житомир: АСА, 1999. – 112 с.
- Творящая личность. – Житомир: МАК, 2001. – 144 с.
- Метафоричний театр Петра Авраменка. – Житомир, 2012. – 208 с.
- Камень и хлеб (притчи) . – Житомир, 2013. – 88 с.
- Когда (притча в диалогах). – Житомир, 2013. – 48 с.
