= Vértesacsa =

Vértesacsa Atscha
- Flag Coat of arms

- Location of Fejér county in Hungary

- Location of Vértesacsa
- Coordinates: 47.36885°N 18.57893°E
- Country: Hungary
- County: Fejér

Area
  - Total: 36.19 km^{2} (13.97 sq mi)

Population (2004)
  - Total: 1,783
  - Density: 49.26/km^{2} (127.6/sq mi)
- Time zone: UTC+1 (CET)
  - Summer (DST): UTC+2 (CEST)
- Postal code: 8089
- Area code: 22
- Website: www.vertesacsa.hu

Vértesacsa (also Vértes-Acsa, German: Atscha) is a village in Fejér County, Hungary, near the city of Székesfehérvár (25 km to the north).
