= Ilovlya =

Urban locality in Volgograd Oblast, Russia

Ilovlya Иловля
- Urban-type settlement
- Interactive map of Ilovlya
- Location of Ilovlya Ilovlya (Volgograd Oblast)
- Coordinates: 49°18′19″N 43°58′45″E
- Country: Russia
- Federal subject: Volgograd Oblast
- Administrative district: Ilovlinsky District
- Founded: 1672

Population (2010 Census)
  - Total: 11,255
  - Estimate (2025): 10,034 (−10.8%)
- Time zone: UTC+3 (MSK)
- Postal code: 403071
- OKTMO ID: 18614151051

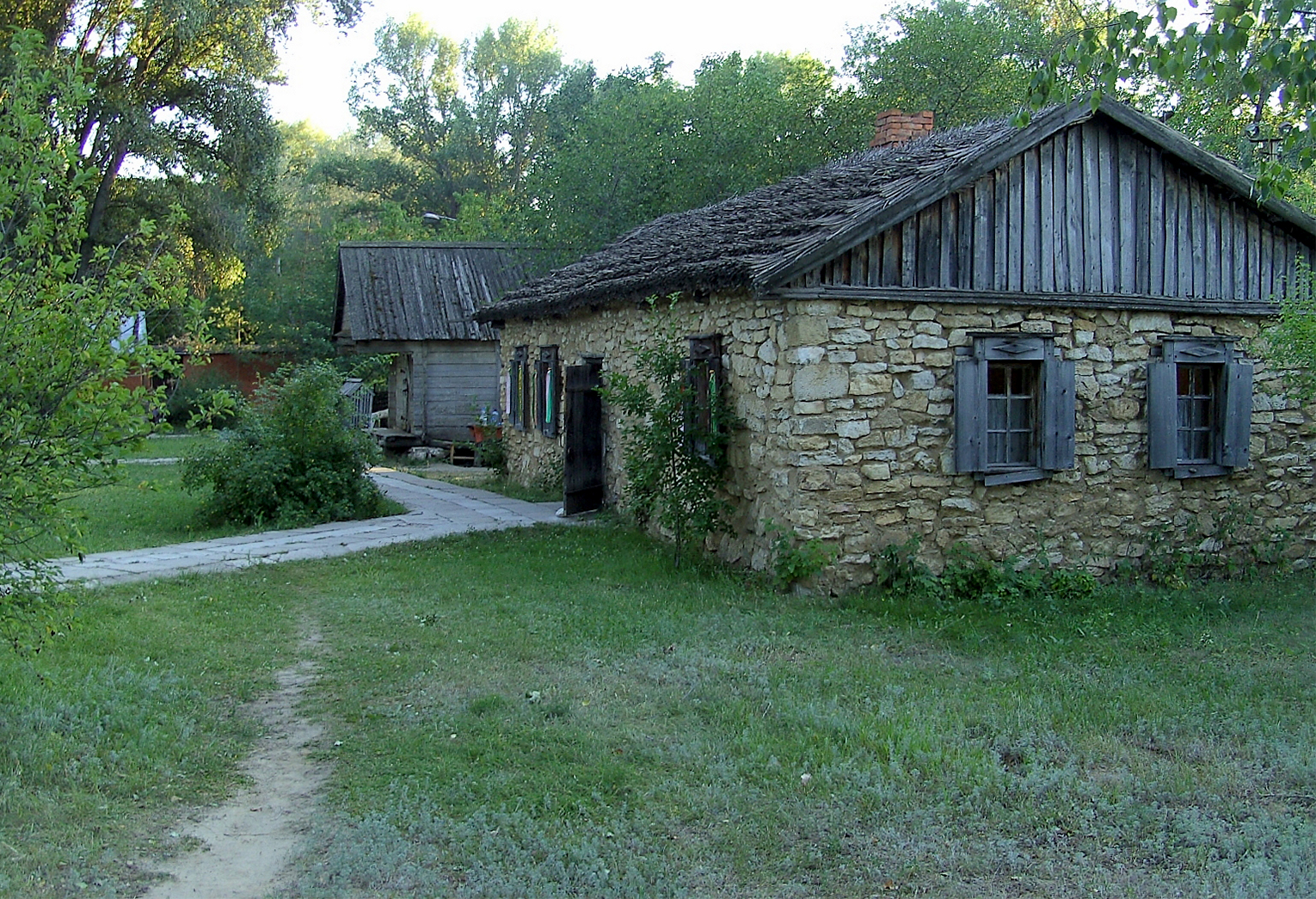
The Museum of Don Cossack Culture and Everyday Life (Иловлинский музей казачьего быта)

Ilovlya (Russian: Иловля) is an urban-type settlement and the administrative center of Ilovlinsky District, Volgograd Oblast, Russia. Population: 11,255 (2010 census); 11,904 (2002 census); 10,295 (1989 Soviet census).
