= Ilovlinsky District =

Ilovlinsky District Иловлинский район (Russian)
- District
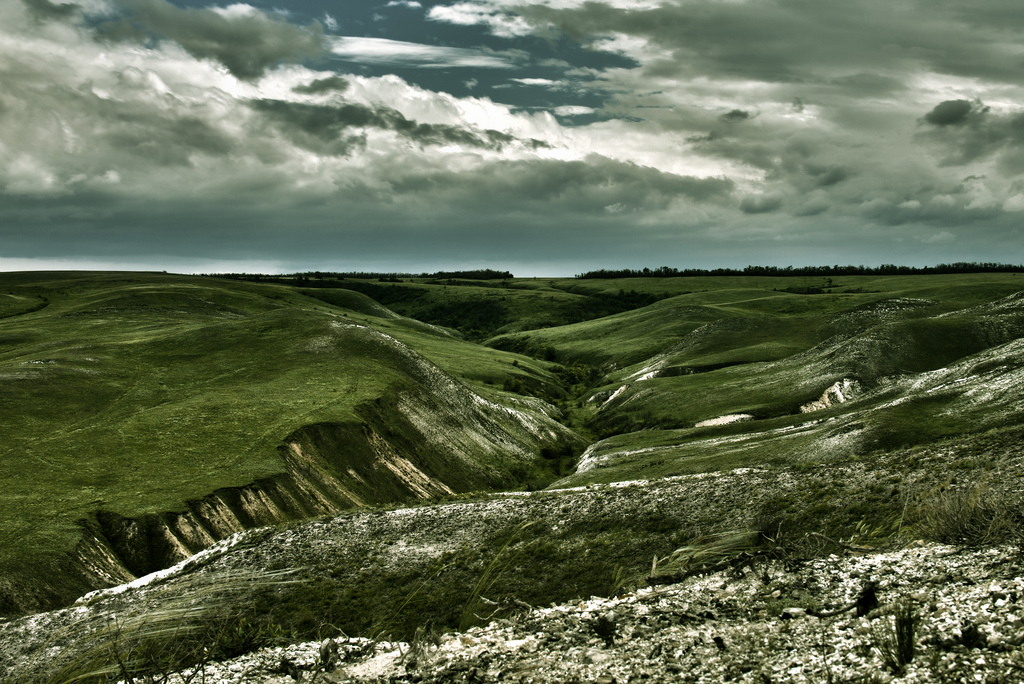
- Landscape near the stanitsa of Tryokhostrovskaya in Ilovlinsky District

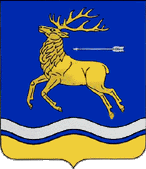
- Flag Coat of arms
- Location of Ilovlinsky District in Volgograd Oblast
- Coordinates: 49°18′N 43°59′E
- Country: Russia
- Federal subject: Volgograd Oblast
- Established: 23 June 1928
- Administrative center: Ilovlya

Area
  - Total: 4,155 km^{2} (1,604 sq mi)

Population (2010 Census)
  - Total: 33,168
  - Density: 7.983/km^{2} (20.68/sq mi)
  - Urban: 33.9%
  - Rural: 66.1%

Administrative structure
  - Administrative divisions: 1 Urban-type settlements, 14 Selsoviets
  - Inhabited localities: 1 urban-type settlements, 51 rural localities

Municipal structure
  - Municipally incorporated as: Ilovlinsky Municipal District
  - Municipal divisions: 1 urban settlements, 13 rural settlements
- Time zone: UTC+3 (MSK)
- OKTMO ID: 18614000

Ilovlinsky District (Russian: Иловли́нский райо́н) is an administrative district (raion), one of the thirty-three in Volgograd Oblast, Russia. As a municipal division, it is incorporated as Ilovlinsky Municipal District. It is located in the center of the oblast. The area of the district is 4,155 square kilometers (1,604 sq mi). Its administrative center is the urban locality (a work settlement) of Ilovlya. Population: 33,168 (2010 census); 34,358 (2002 Census); 31,678 (1989 Soviet census). The population of Ilovlya accounts for 33.9% of the district's total population.
