= Kamyshin =

City in Volgograd Oblast, Russia

Kamyshin Камышин
- City
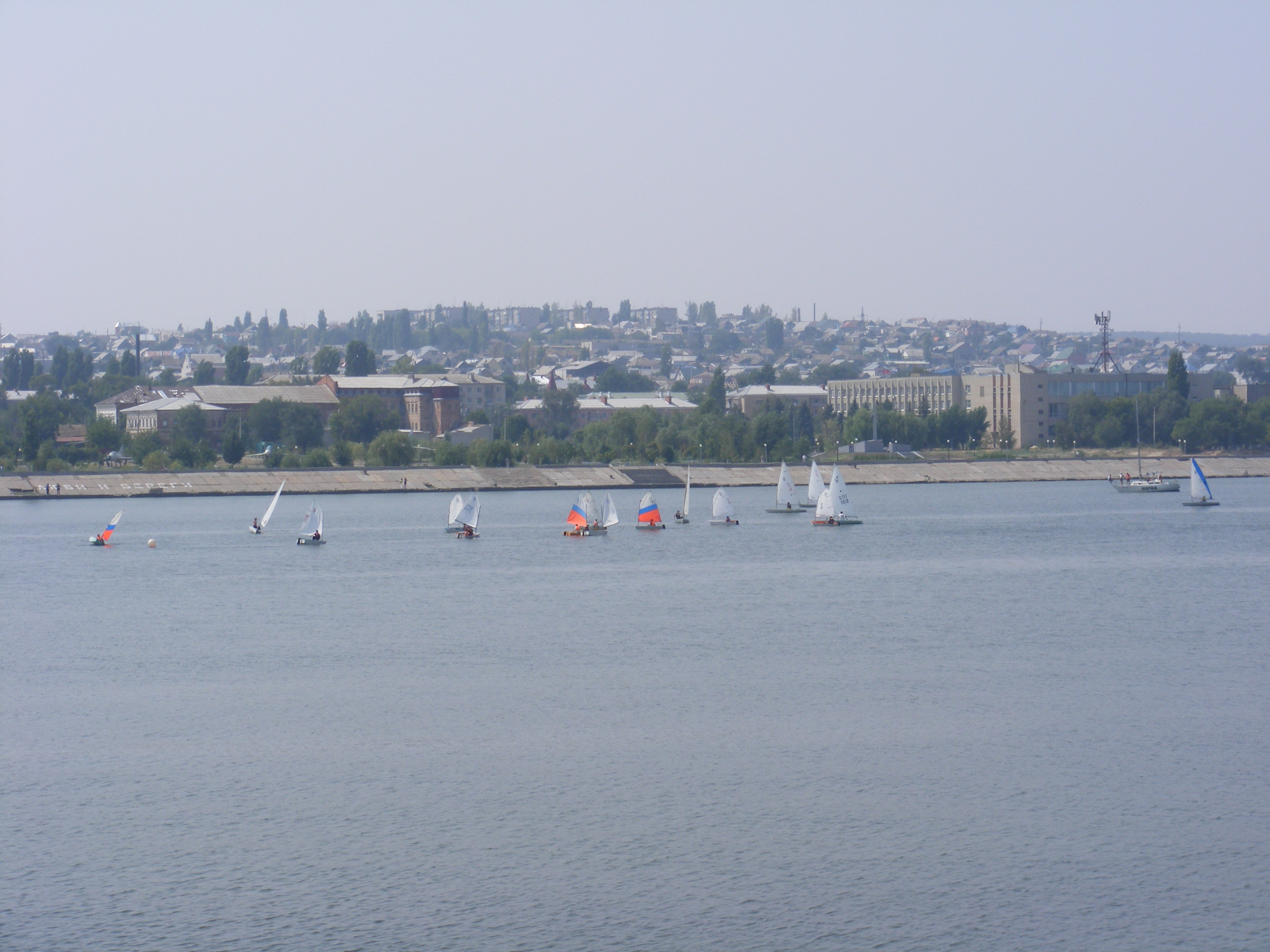
- View of Kamyshin from the Volgograd Reservoir

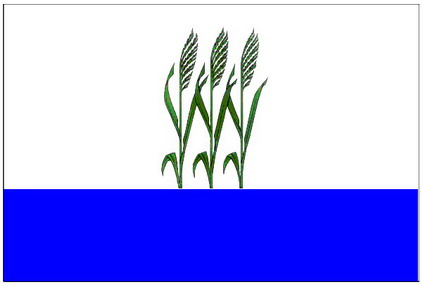
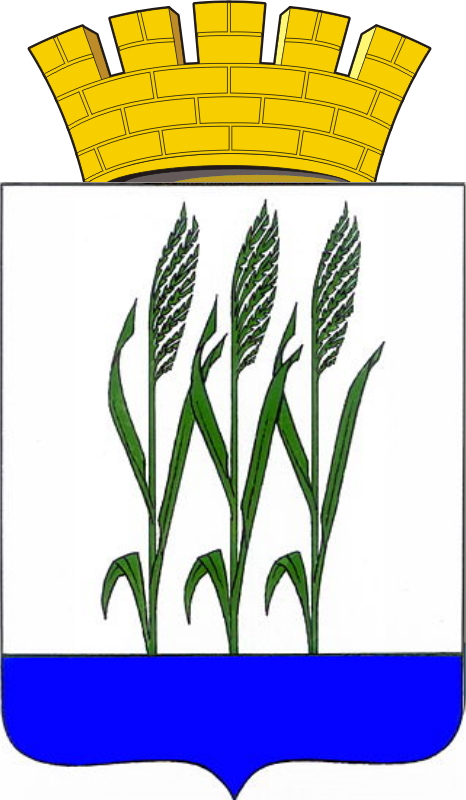
- Flag Coat of arms
- Interactive map of Kamyshin
- Location of Kamyshin Kamyshin (European Russia) Kamyshin (Europe)
- Coordinates: 50°05′N 45°24′E
- Country: Russia
- Federal subject: Volgograd Oblast
- Founded: 1667
- City status since: 1780

Government
  - Head: Alexander Chunakov
- Elevation: 50 m (160 ft)

Population (2010 Census)
  - Total: 119,565
  - Estimate (2025): 104,220 (−12.8%)
  - Rank: 136th in 2010

Administrative status
  - Subordinated to: city of oblast significance of Kamyshin
  - Capital of: Kamyshinsky District, city of oblast significance of Kamyshin

Municipal status
  - Urban okrug: Kamyshin Urban Okrug
  - Capital of: Kamyshin Urban Okrug, Kamyshinsky Municipal District
- Time zone: UTC+3 (MSK)
- Postal code: 403870—403895
- Dialing code: +7 84457
- OKTMO ID: 18715000001
- Website: www.admkamyshin.info

Kamyshin (Russian: Камышин, IPA: [kɐˈmɨʂɨn]) is a city in Volgograd Oblast, Russia, located on the right bank of the Volgograd Reservoir of the Volga River, in the estuary of the Kamyshinka River. Its population was 119,565 at the (2010 census). Past populations for Kamyshin include 127,891 at the (2002 census) and 122,463 as of the (1989 Soviet census).

== History ==
It was founded in 1667 on the left bank of the Kamyshinka River. In 1710, all of its inhabitants were relocated to the fortress of Dmitriyevsk (Дмитриевск) on the opposite bank of the river. In 1780, the name was changed to Kamyshin and it was granted town status. In the 19th century, Kamyshin turned into a merchant city with sawmills and windmills. It was formerly famous for its watermelon trade. According to the 1897 census, the population was, by mother tongue, 82.5% Russian, 15.0% German, 1.6% Ukrainian, 0.4% Polish, and 0.2% Jewish.

=== Portage between the Volga and Don Rivers ===
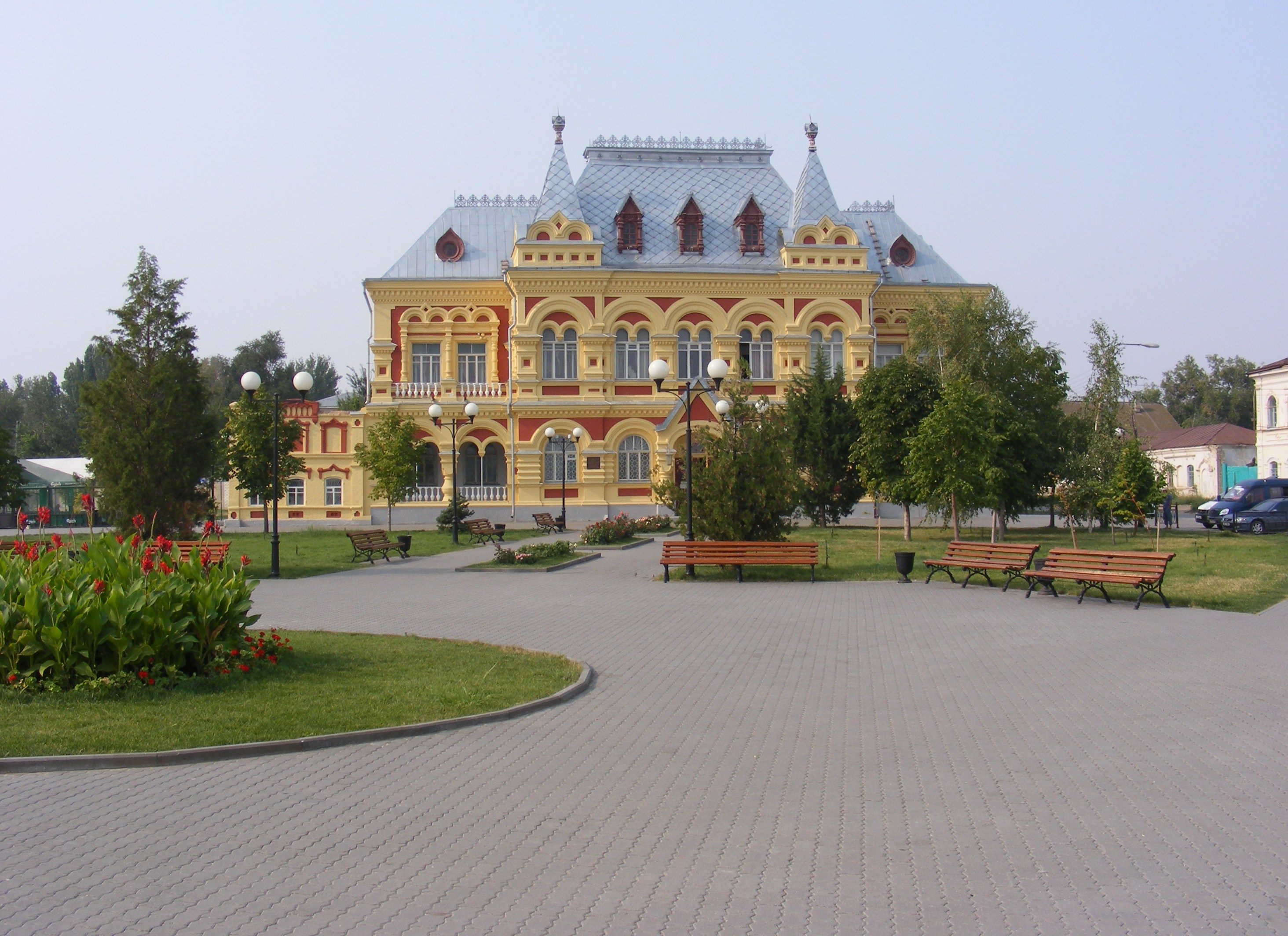
Kamyshin Historical Museum

Near Kamyshin, the Volga is quite close—17 kilometers (11 mi)—to the upper reaches of the Ilovlya River, the tributary of the Don. The distance between the sources of the Kamyshinka River, the tributary of the Volga, and the Ilovlya is only a little more than 4 kilometers (2.5 mi). In this place in ancient times there existed a portage ("volok") many times used by the troops invading the land of the Khazars, and moving from the Don basin to the Volga. In the 16th century, the Turkish Sultan Selim II attempted to build a canal here. A similar effort was later made by Peter the Great who built the fort, originally named Petrovsk, to protect workmen during the (unfinished) construction of the canal.

== Administrative and municipal status ==
Within the framework of administrative divisions, Kamyshin serves as the administrative center of Kamyshinsky District, even though it is not a part of it. As an administrative division, it is incorporated separately as the city of oblast significance of Kamyshin—an administrative unit with the status equal to that of the districts. As a municipal division, the city of oblast significance of Kamyshin is incorporated as Kamyshin Urban Okrug.

== Climate ==
The city lies within the humid continental climate (Köppen: Dfa) zone, and experiences four distinct seasons.

Climate data for Kamyshin
Month	Jan	Feb	Mar	Apr	May	Jun	Jul	Aug	Sep	Oct	Nov	Dec	Year
Record high °C (°F)	12.3 (54.1)	12.0 (53.6)	19.8 (67.6)	28.6 (83.5)	36.6 (97.9)	39.8 (103.6)	41.5 (106.7)	41.2 (106.2)	39.3 (102.7)	27.7 (81.9)	17.0 (62.6)	11.0 (51.8)	41.5 (106.7)
Mean daily maximum °C (°F)	−4.6 (23.7)	−4.8 (23.4)	1.5 (34.7)	13.9 (57.0)	21.5 (70.7)	26.8 (80.2)	29.2 (84.6)	27.5 (81.5)	20.6 (69.1)	11.6 (52.9)	2.1 (35.8)	−3.3 (26.1)	11.8 (53.2)
Daily mean °C (°F)	−7.5 (18.5)	−7.8 (18.0)	−2.0 (28.4)	8.9 (48.0)	16.1 (61.0)	21.4 (70.5)	23.7 (74.7)	22.0 (71.6)	15.5 (59.9)	7.6 (45.7)	−0.7 (30.7)	−5.9 (21.4)	7.6 (45.7)
Mean daily minimum °C (°F)	−10.5 (13.1)	−11.1 (12.0)	−5.3 (22.5)	4.2 (39.6)	10.5 (50.9)	15.9 (60.6)	18.2 (64.8)	16.4 (61.5)	10.6 (51.1)	3.8 (38.8)	−3.4 (25.9)	−8.9 (16.0)	4.6 (40.3)
Record low °C (°F)	−35 (−31)	−32.7 (−26.9)	−27.8 (−18.0)	−12.8 (9.0)	−1.1 (30.0)	1.0 (33.8)	6.0 (42.8)	3.8 (38.8)	−3.2 (26.2)	−10 (14)	−25 (−13)	−30 (−22)	−35 (−31)
Average precipitation mm (inches)	32 (1.3)	26 (1.0)	25 (1.0)	29 (1.1)	41 (1.6)	39 (1.5)	36 (1.4)	28 (1.1)	41 (1.6)	26 (1.0)	32 (1.3)	34 (1.3)	389 (15.3)
Source: Pogoda.ru.net

== Sports ==
FC Tekstilshchik Kamyshin now plays in Russian Second Division; however, in 1992-1996 the club played in the top tier of Russian association football, achieving fourth place in 1993. This was followed by the campaign in the UEFA Cup where Tekstilshchik reached the second round.

== Miscellaneous ==
Near Kamyshin, there is a 330-meter (1,080 ft) tall guyed TV mast, which belongs to the tallest man-made structures in Volgograd Oblast.

== Notable people ==
- Olexander Chyrkov, university professor
- Alexey Maresyev, flying ace
- Pavel Smurov, former Russian professional footballer
- Oleg Polyakov, footballer
- Eugene Martynov, singer

== Sister city ==
- Opava, Czech Republic
