= Kamyshinsky District =

Kamyshinsky District Камышинский район (Russian)
- District
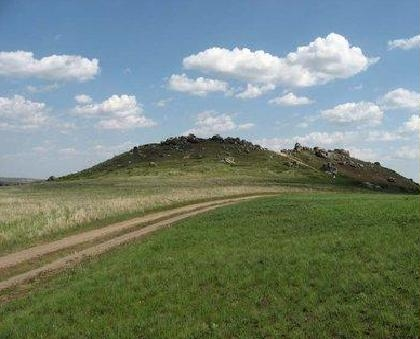
- Kamyshinskiye Ushi, a natural monument in Kamyshinsky District

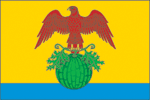
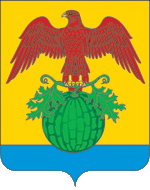
- Flag Coat of arms
- Location of Kamyshinsky District in Volgograd Oblast
- Coordinates: 50°04′N 45°24′E
- Country: Russia
- Federal subject: Volgograd Oblast
- Established: 23 June 1928
- Administrative center: Kamyshin

Area
  - Total: 3,563 km^{2} (1,376 sq mi)

Population (2010 Census)
  - Total: 42,893
  - Density: 12.04/km^{2} (31.18/sq mi)
  - Urban: 30.9%
  - Rural: 69.1%

Administrative structure
  - Administrative divisions: 1 Towns of district significance, 20 Selsoviets
  - Inhabited localities: 1 cities/towns, 47 rural localities

Municipal structure
  - Municipally incorporated as: Kamyshinsky Municipal District
  - Municipal divisions: 1 urban settlements, 18 rural settlements
- Time zone: UTC+3 (MSK)
- OKTMO ID: 18618000

Kamyshinsky District (Russian: Камы́шинский райо́н) is an administrative district (raion), one of the thirty-three in Volgograd Oblast, Russia. As a municipal division, it is incorporated as Kamyshinsky Municipal District. It is located in the northeast of the oblast. The area of the district is 3,563 square kilometers (1,376 sq mi). Its administrative center is the city of Kamyshin (which is not administratively a part of the district). Population: 42,893 (2010 census); 45,019 (2002 Census); 37,276 (1989 Soviet census).

== Administrative and municipal status ==
Within the framework of administrative divisions, Kamyshinsky District is one of the thirty-three in the oblast. The city of Kamyshin serves as its administrative center, despite being incorporated separately as a town of oblast significance—an administrative unit with the status equal to that of the districts.

As a municipal division, the district is incorporated as Kamyshinsky Municipal District. The city of oblast significance of Kamyshin is incorporated separately from the district as Kamyshin Urban Okrug.
