= Volga Upland =

High plains in Russia

- Приволжская возвышенность
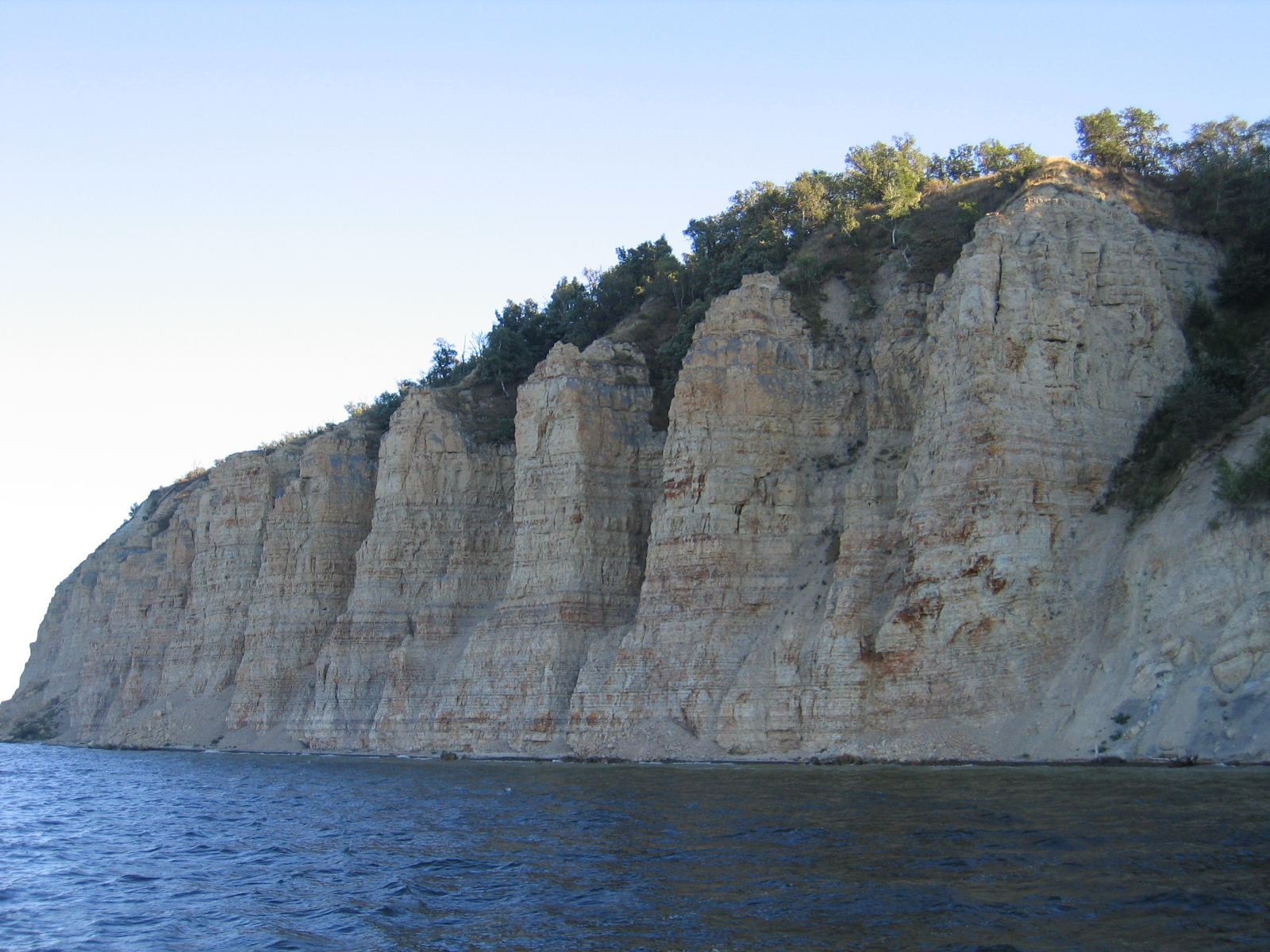
- Stolbichi wall on the banks of the Volga

Highest point
- Peak: Unnamed
- Elevation: 381 m (1,250 ft)

Dimensions
- Length: 800 km (500 mi) NNE/SSW
- Width: 500 km (310 mi) ESE/WNW

Geography
- Location within European Russia Location within Russia
- Location: Nizhny Novgorod Oblast, Mordovia, Chuvashia, Tatarstan, Penza Oblast, Ulyanovsk Oblast, Samara Oblast, Saratov Oblast, Volgograd Oblast, Russia
- Range coordinates: 53°07′N 46°36′E
- Parent range: East European Plain

Geology
- Rock age(s): Carboniferous, Cretaceous
- Rock type(s): Limestones, dolomite, sandstone, chalk

The Volga Upland, also known as the Volga Uplands, Volga Hills, or Volga Plateau (Russian: Приволжская возвышенность, romanized: Privolzhskaya vozvyshennost'), is a vast region of the East European Plain in the European part of Russia that lies west of the Volga River and east of the Central Russian Upland.

The uplands lie in the cool continental climate zone, characterised by large fluctuations in seasonal temperatures and generally little rainfall. Outside of the cities in the region, population density is generally between 28 and 129 inhabitants per square mile.

== Geography ==
The uplands run for approximately 800 kilometres (500 mi) in a southwest-northeasterly direction from Volgograd to Kazan. The Tsimlyansk Reservoir lies at the southwestern end of the Volga Upland, with the Kuybyshev Reservoir at the northeastern end.

The landscape on the Volga Uplands is hilly, and several rivers have cut into it, such as the Khopyor, Medveditsa and the Sura. The Volga–Don Canal cuts through the lowlands between the Volga Uplands to the north and the adjacent Yergeni Hills to the south.

The Volga Uplands themselves are rather sparsely populated, but along their edges and in particular along the banks of the Volga there are several large cities, such as (from north to south) Kazan, Ulyanovsk, Saransk, Penza, Syzran, Saratov and Volgograd.

=== Subranges ===
The hill ranges along the Volga banks are traditionally called mountains (горы), despite being of low height. The main ones are:

- Uslon Mountains
- Yuryevy Mountains
- Bogorodskye Mountains
- Syukeyevo Mountains
- Tetyushi Mountains
- Undory Mountains
- Zhiguli Mountains
- Khvalynsk Mountains
- Don-Medveditsa Ridge

== See also ==
- Highest points of Russian Federal subjects
- List of mountains and hills of Russia
- Taw yağı
