= Dobrinka =

Dobrinka (Russian: Добринка) is the name of several rural localities in Russia:

- Dobrinka, Lipetsk Oblast, a settlement in Dobrinsky Selsoviet of Dobrinsky District of Lipetsk Oblast
- Dobrinka, Novosibirsk Oblast, a village in Chanovsky District of Novosibirsk Oblast
- Dobrinka, Orenburg Oblast, a selo in Dobrinsky Selsoviet of Alexandrovsky District of Orenburg Oblast
- Dobrinka, Smolensk Oblast, a village in Tsarevo-Zaymishchenskoye Rural Settlement of Vyazemsky District of Smolensk Oblast
- Dobrinka, Tambov Oblast, a village in Krasnokustovsky Selsoviet of Muchkapsky District of Tambov Oblast
- Dobrinka, Tula Oblast, a village in Pesochenskaya Rural Territory of Suvorovsky District of Tula Oblast
- Dobrinka, Nikolayevsky District, Volgograd Oblast, a khutor in Baranovsky Selsoviet of Nikolayevsky District of Volgograd Oblast
- Dobrinka, Surovikinsky District, Volgograd Oblast, a khutor in Dobrinsky Selsoviet of Surovikinsky District of Volgograd Oblast
- Dobrinka, Uryupinsky District, Volgograd Oblast, a stanitsa in Dobrinsky Selsoviet of Uryupinsky District of Volgograd Oblast
