= Belyayevka =

Belyayevka (Russian: Беляевка) is the name of several rural localities in Russia:

- Belyayevka, Nizhny Novgorod Oblast, a village in Loyminsky Selsoviet of Sokolsky District of Nizhny Novgorod Oblast
- Belyayevka, Omsk Oblast, a village in Zameletenovsky Rural Okrug of Lyubinsky District of Omsk Oblast
- Belyayevka, Belyayevsky District, Orenburg Oblast, a selo in Belyayevsky Selsoviet of Belyayevsky District of Orenburg Oblast
- Belyayevka, Sol-Iletsky District, Orenburg Oblast, a selo in Mikhaylovsky Selsoviet of Sol-Iletsky District of Orenburg Oblast
- Belyayevka, Okhansky District, Perm Krai, a selo in Okhansky District, Perm Krai
- Belyayevka, Vereshchaginsky District, Perm Krai, a village in Vereshchaginsky District, Perm Krai
- Belyayevka, Pskov Oblast, a village in Pytalovsky District of Pskov Oblast
- Belyayevka, Rostov Oblast, a khutor in Dyachkinskoye Rural Settlement of Tarasovsky District of Rostov Oblast
- Belyayevka, Ryazan Oblast, a village in Ostrovsky Rural Okrug of Sarayevsky District of Ryazan Oblast
- Belyayevka, Saratov Oblast, a selo in Turkovsky District of Saratov Oblast
- Belyayevka, Inzhavinsky District, Tambov Oblast, a village in Kaluginsky Selsoviet of Inzhavinsky District of Tambov Oblast
- Belyayevka, Sampursky District, Tambov Oblast, a selo in Sampursky Selsoviet of Sampursky District of Tambov Oblast
- Belyayevka, Volgograd Oblast, a selo in Belyayevsky Selsoviet of Staropoltavsky District of Volgograd Oblast
- Belyayevka, Vologda Oblast, a village in Kumbisersky Selsoviet of Nikolsky District of Vologda Oblast

== See also ==
- Biliaivka (disambiguation)
