= Solodushino =

Solodushino Солодушино
- Selo
- Location within Volgograd Oblast Location within Russia
- Coordinates: 49°57′N 45°25′E
- Country: Russia
- Region: Volgograd Oblast
- District: Nikolayevsky District
- Time zone: UTC+4:00

Solodushino (Russian: Солодушино) is a rural locality (a selo) and the administrative center of Solodushinskoye Rural Settlement, Nikolayevsky District, Volgograd Oblast, Russia. The population was 1,588 as of 2010. There are 13 streets.

== Geography ==
Solodushino is located on the Transvolga, on Caspian Depression, on the east bank of the Volgograd Reservoir, 14 km southwest of Nikolayevsk (the district's administrative centre) by road. Ochkurovka is the nearest rural locality.
