= Cherebayevo =

Cherebayevo Черебаево
- Selo
- Location within Volgograd Oblast Location within Russia
- Coordinates: 50°43′N 45°55′E
- Country: Russia
- Region: Volgograd Oblast
- District: Staropoltavsky District
- Time zone: UTC+4:00

Cherebayevo (Russian: Черебаево) is a rural locality (a selo) in Staropoltavsky District, Volgograd Oblast, Russia. The population was 585 as of 2010. There are 13 streets.

== Geography ==
Cherebayevo is located in steppe, on Transvolga, near the Volgograd Reservoir, 74 km northwest of Staraya Poltavka (the district's administrative centre) by road. Limanny is the nearest rural locality.
