= Ochkurovka =

Ochkurovka Очкуровка
- Selo
- Location within Volgograd Oblast Location within Russia
- Coordinates: 49°59′N 45°25′E
- Country: Russia
- Region: Volgograd Oblast
- District: Nikolayevsky District
- Time zone: UTC+4:00

Ochkurovka (Russian: Очкуровка) is a rural locality (a selo) and the administrative center of Ochkurovskoye Rural Settlement, Nikolayevsky District, Volgograd Oblast, Russia. The population was 1,232 as of 2010. There are 18 streets.

== Geography ==
Ochkurovka is located on Transvolga, on the east bank of the Volgograd Reservoir, on Caspian Depression, 6 km southwest of Nikolayevsk (the district's administrative centre) by road. Nikolayevsk is the nearest rural locality.
