= Politotdelskoye =

Politotdelskoye Политотдельское
- Selo
- Location within Volgograd Oblast Location within Russia
- Coordinates: 50°12′N 45°42′E
- Country: Russia
- Region: Volgograd Oblast
- District: Nikolayevsky District
- Time zone: UTC+4:00

Politotdelskoye (Russian: Политотдельское) is a rural locality (a selo) and the administrative center of Politotdelskoye Rural Settlement, Nikolayevsky District, Volgograd Oblast, Russia. The population was 1,085 as of 2010. There are 16 streets.

== Geography ==
Politotdelskoye is located on Transvolga, on the east bank of the Volgograd Reservoir, on Caspian Depression, 36 km northeast of Nikolayevsk (the district's administrative centre) by road. Levchunovka is the nearest rural locality.
