= Krasny Meliorator =

Krasny Meliorator Красный Мелиоратор
- Khutor
- Location within Volgograd Oblast Location within Russia
- Coordinates: 50°01′N 46°05′E
- Country: Russia
- Region: Volgograd Oblast
- District: Nikolayevsky District
- Time zone: UTC+4:00

Krasny Meliorator (Russian: Красный Мелиоратор) is a rural locality (a khutor) and the administrative center of Baranovskoye Rural Settlement, Nikolayevsky District, Volgograd Oblast, Russia. The population was 1,169 as of 2010. There are 15 streets.

== Geography ==
Krasny Meliorator is located on Transvolga, on the east bank of the Volgograd Reservoir, 55 km east of Nikolayevsk (the district's administrative centre) by road. Oroshayemy is the nearest rural locality.
