= Novy Byt, Volgograd Oblast =

Novy Byt Новый Быт
- Khutor
- Location within Volgograd Oblast Location within Russia
- Coordinates: 49°49′N 45°54′E
- Country: Russia
- Region: Volgograd Oblast
- District: Nikolayevsky District
- Time zone: UTC+4:00

Novy Byt (Russian: Новый Быт) is a rural locality (a khutor) and the administrative center of Novobytovskoye Rural Settlement, Nikolayevsky District, Volgograd Oblast, Russia. The population was 797 as of 2010. There are 17 streets.

== Geography ==
Novy Byt is located on Transvolga, on Caspian Depression, 73 km southeast of Nikolayevsk (the district's administrative centre) by road. Put Ilyicha is the nearest rural locality.
