= Nizhnyaya Vodyanka =

Selo in Volgograd Oblast, Russia

Nizhnyaya Vodyanka Нижняя Водянка
- Selo
- Location within Volgograd Oblast Location within Russia
- Coordinates: 50°21′N 47°07′E
- Country: Russia
- Region: Volgograd Oblast
- District: Staropoltavsky District
- Time zone: UTC+4:00

Nizhnyaya Vodyanka (Russian: Нижняя Водянка) is a rural locality (a selo) in Verkhnevodyanskoye Rural Settlement, Staropoltavsky District, Volgograd Oblast, Russia. The population was 15 as of 2010. There are 3 streets.

== Geography ==
Nizhnyaya Vodyanka is located in steppe, on Transvolga, on the right bank of the Vodyanka River, 55 km southeast of Staraya Poltavka (the district's administrative centre) by road. Verkhnyaya Vodyanka is the nearest rural locality.
