= Torgun, Volgograd Oblast =

Torgun Торгун
- Settlement
- Location within Volgograd Oblast Location within Russia
- Coordinates: 50°18′N 47°12′E
- Country: Russia
- Region: Volgograd Oblast
- District: Staropoltavsky District
- Time zone: UTC+4:00

Torgun (Russian: Торгун) is a rural locality (a settlement) and the administrative center of Torgunskoye Rural Settlement, Staropoltavsky District, Volgograd Oblast, Russia. The population was 752 as of 2010. There are 13 streets.

== Geography ==
Torgun is located in steppe, on Transvolga, on the left bank of the Vodyanka River, 64 km southeast of Staraya Poltavka (the district's administrative centre) by road. Verkhnyaya Vodyanka is the nearest rural locality.
