= Oroshayemy =

Oroshayemy Орошаемый
- Settlement
- Location within Volgograd Oblast Location within Russia
- Coordinates: 49°58′N 46°02′E
- Country: Russia
- Region: Volgograd Oblast
- District: Nikolayevsky District
- Time zone: UTC+4:00

Oroshayemy (Russian: Орошаемый) is a rural locality (a settlement) in Sovkhozskoye Rural Settlement, Nikolayevsky District, Volgograd Oblast, Russia. The population was 140 as of 2010. There are 4 streets.

== Geography ==
Oroshayemy is located in steppe on the left bank of the Volgograd Reservoir, 52 km east of Nikolayevsk (the district's administrative centre) by road. Krasny Meliorator is the nearest rural locality.
