= Brigady 3 =

Brigady 3 Бригады № 3
- Settlement
- Location within Volgograd Oblast Location within Russia
- Coordinates: 50°01′N 45°35′E
- Country: Russia
- Region: Volgograd Oblast
- District: Nikolayevsky District
- Time zone: UTC+4:00

Brigady 3 (Russian: Бригады № 3) is a rural locality (a settlement) in Politotdelskoye Rural Settlement, Nikolayevsky District, Volgograd Oblast, Russia. The population was 96 as of 2010. There are 3 streets.

== Geography ==
Brigady 3 is located in steppe on the left bank of the Volgograd Reservoir, 14 km east of Nikolayevsk (the district's administrative centre) by road. Leninskoye is the nearest rural locality.
