= Rulevoy =

Rulevoy Рулевой
- Settlement
- Location within Volgograd Oblast Location within Russia
- Coordinates: 50°01′N 45°51′E
- Country: Russia
- Region: Volgograd Oblast
- District: Nikolayevsky District
- Time zone: UTC+4:00

Rulevoy (Russian: Рулевой) is a rural locality (a settlement) in Stepnovskoye Rural Settlement, Nikolayevsky District, Volgograd Oblast, Russia. The population was 334 as of 2010. There are 5 streets.

== Geography ==
Rulevoy is located in steppe on the left bank of the Volgograd Reservoir, 36 km east of Nikolayevsk (the district's administrative centre) by road. Stepnovsky is the nearest rural locality.
