= Kano, Volgograd Oblast =

Kano Кано
- Selo
- Location within Volgograd Oblast Location within Russia
- Coordinates: 50°26′N 46°38′E
- Country: Russia
- Region: Volgograd Oblast
- District: Staropoltavsky District
- Time zone: UTC+4:00

Kano (Russian: Кано) is a rural locality (a selo) and the administrative center of Kanovskoye Rural Settlement, Staropoltavsky District, Volgograd Oblast, Russia. The population was 407 as of 2010. There are 9 streets.

== Geography ==
Kano is located in steppe, on Transvolga, on the left bank of the Solyonaya Kuba River, 17 km southeast of Staraya Poltavka (the district's administrative centre) by road. Suyetinovka is the nearest rural locality.
