= Ilovatka =

Ilovatka Иловатка
- Selo
- Location within Volgograd Oblast Location within Russia
- Coordinates: 50°30′N 45°53′E
- Country: Russia
- Region: Volgograd Oblast
- District: Staropoltavsky District
- Time zone: UTC+4:00

Ilovatka (Russian: Иловатка) is a rural locality (a selo) and the administrative center of Ilovatskoye Rural Settlement, Staropoltavsky District, Volgograd Oblast, Russia. The population was 1,434 as of 2010. There are 22 streets.

== Geography ==
Ilovatka is located in steppe, on the east bank of the Volgograd Reservoir, 55 km west of Staraya Poltavka (the district's administrative centre) by road. Belokamenka is the nearest rural locality.
