= Kumysolechebnitsa =

Kumysolechebnitsa Кумысолечебница
- Settlement
- Location within Volgograd Oblast Location within Russia
- Coordinates: 49°54′N 45°59′E
- Country: Russia
- Region: Volgograd Oblast
- District: Nikolayevsky District
- Time zone: UTC+4:00

Kumysolechebnitsa (Russian: Кумысолечебница) is a rural locality (a settlement) in Sovkhozskoye Rural Settlement, Nikolayevsky District, Volgograd Oblast, Russia. The population was 230 as of 2010. There are 3 streets.

== Geography ==
Kumysolechebnitsa is located in steppe on the left bank of the Volgograd Reservoir, 63 km southeast of Nikolayevsk (the district's administrative centre) by road. Razdolnoye is the nearest rural locality.
