= Kolyshkino =

Kolyshkino Колышкино
- Selo
- Kolyshkino in Volgograd Oblast Kolyshkino (Russia)
- Coordinates: 50°26′N 45°55′E
- Country: Russia
- Region: Volgograd Oblast
- District: Staropoltavsky District

Population (2010)
  - Total: 545
- Time zone: UTC+3:00 (MSK)

Kolyshkino (Russian: Колышкино) is a rural locality (a selo) and the administrative center of Kolyshkinskoye Rural Settlement, Staropoltavsky District, Volgograd Oblast, Russia. The population was 545 as of 2010. There are 15 streets.

== Geography ==
Kolyshkino is located on the east bank of the Volgograd Reservoir, 50 km west of Staraya Poltavka (the district's administrative centre) by road. Ilovatka is the nearest rural locality.
