= Saltovo =

Saltovo Салтово
- Selo
- Location within Volgograd Oblast Location within Russia
- Coordinates: 50°38′N 46°38′E
- Country: Russia
- Region: Volgograd Oblast
- District: Staropoltavsky District
- Time zone: UTC+4:00

Saltovo (Russian: Салтово) is a rural locality (a selo) and the administrative center of Saltovskoye Rural Settlement, Staropoltavsky District, Volgograd Oblast, Russia. The population was 932 in 2010. There are ten streets.

== Geography ==
Saltovo is located in steppe, on Transvolga, on the bank of the Yeruslan River, 26 km northeast of Staraya Poltavka (the district's administrative centre) by road. Lyatoshinka is the nearest rural locality.
