= Levchunovka =

Levchunovka Левчуновка
- Selo
- Location within Volgograd Oblast Location within Russia
- Coordinates: 50°07′N 45°42′E
- Country: Russia
- Region: Volgograd Oblast
- District: Nikolayevsky District
- Time zone: UTC+4:00

Levchunovka (Russian: Левчуновка) is a rural locality (a selo) and the administrative center of Levchunovskoye Rural Settlement, Nikolayevsky District, Volgograd Oblast, Russia. The population was 1,005 as of 2010. There are 24 streets.

== Geography ==
Levchunovka is located on Transvolga, 26 km northeast of Nikolayevsk (the district's administrative centre) by road. Pioner is the nearest rural locality.
