= Libknekhta =

Libknekhta Либкнехта
- Khutor
- Location within Volgograd Oblast Location within Russia
- Coordinates: 50°04′N 46°23′E
- Country: Russia
- Region: Volgograd Oblast
- District: Nikolayevsky District
- Time zone: UTC+4:00

Libknekhta (Russian: Либкнехта) is a rural locality (a khutor) in Baranovskoye Rural Settlement, Nikolayevsky District, Volgograd Oblast, Russia. The population was 24 as of 2010.

== Geography ==
Libknekhta is located in steppe on the left bank of the Volgograd Reservoir, 80 km east of Nikolayevsk (the district's administrative centre) by road. Krasnoye Znamya is the nearest rural locality.
