= Torgunsky =

Torgunsky Торгунский
- Settlement
- Location within Volgograd Oblast Location within Russia
- Coordinates: 50°09′N 46°24′E
- Country: Russia
- Region: Volgograd Oblast
- District: Nikolayevsky District
- Time zone: UTC+4:00

Torgunsky (Russian: Торгунский) is a rural locality (a settlement) in Baranovskoye Rural Settlement, Nikolayevsky District, Volgograd Oblast, Russia. The population was 116 as of 2010.

== Geography ==
Torgunsky is located in steppe on the left bank of the Volgograd Reservoir, 91 km east of Nikolayevsk (the district's administrative centre) by road. Melovoy is the nearest rural locality.
