= Bolshiye Prudy =

Bolshiye Prudy Большие Пруды
- Khutor
- Location within Volgograd Oblast Location within Russia
- Coordinates: 50°25′N 46°57′E
- Country: Russia
- Region: Volgograd Oblast
- District: Staropoltavsky District
- Time zone: UTC+4:00

Bolshiye Prudy (Russian: Большие Пруды) is a rural locality (a khutor) in Gmelinskoye Rural Settlement, Staropoltavsky District, Volgograd Oblast, Russia. The population was 30 as of 2010.

== Geography ==
Bolshiye Prudy is located in a steppe of the Transvolga Region, on the bank of the Bolshoy Pond, 46 km southeast of Staraya Poltavka (the district's administrative centre) by road. Pervomaysky is the nearest rural locality.
