= Chkalov, Volgograd Oblast =

Chkalov Чкалов
- Khutor
- Location within Volgograd Oblast Location within Russia
- Coordinates: 50°02′N 46°13′E
- Country: Russia
- Region: Volgograd Oblast
- District: Nikolayevsky District
- Time zone: UTC+4:00

Chkalov (Russian: Чкалов) is a rural locality (a khutor) in Baranovskoye Rural Settlement, Nikolayevsky District, Volgograd Oblast, Russia. The population was 9 as of 2010.

== Geography ==
Chkalov is located in steppe on the left bank of the Volgograd Reservoir, 71 km east of Nikolayevsk (the district's administrative centre) by road. Krasnoye Znamya is the nearest rural locality.
