= Iskra, Nikolayevsky District, Volgograd Oblast =

Iskra Искра
- Selo
- Location within Volgograd Oblast Location within Russia
- Coordinates: 50°04′N 45°34′E
- Country: Russia
- Region: Volgograd Oblast
- District: Nikolayevsky District
- Time zone: UTC+4:00

Iskra (Russian: Искра) is a rural locality (a selo) in Leninskoye Rural Settlement, Nikolayevsky District, Volgograd Oblast, Russia. The population was 189 as of 2010. There are 9 streets.

== Geography ==
Iskra is located on the left bank of the Volgograd Reservoir, 13 km northeast of Nikolayevsk (the district's administrative centre) by road. Leninskoye is the nearest rural locality.
