= Fermy 2 sovkhoza Vodyanovsky =

Fermy 2 sovkhoza Vodyanovsky Фермы № 2 совхоза «Водяновский»
- Settlement
- Location within Volgograd Oblast Location within Russia
- Coordinates: 50°29′N 47°09′E
- Country: Russia
- Region: Volgograd Oblast
- District: Staropoltavsky District
- Time zone: UTC+4:00

Fermy 2 sovkhoza Vodyanovsky (Russian: Фермы № 2 совхоза «Водяновский») is a rural locality (a settlement) in Verkhnevodyanskoye Rural Settlement, Staropoltavsky District, Volgograd Oblast, Russia. The population was 95 as of 2010. There are 3 streets.

== Geography ==
The settlement is located on the steppe, in the Transvolga region, 196 km east of Staraya Poltavka (the district's administrative centre) by road. Zaprudnoye is the nearest rural locality.
