= Suyetinovka =

Suyetinovka Суетиновка
- Selo
- Location within Volgograd Oblast Location within Russia
- Coordinates: 50°21′N 46°38′E
- Country: Russia
- Region: Volgograd Oblast
- District: Staropoltavsky District
- Time zone: UTC+4:00

Suyetinovka (Russian: Суетиновка) is a rural locality (a selo) in Kanovskoye Rural Settlement, Staropoltavsky District, Volgograd Oblast, Russia. The population was 45 as of 2010. There are 3 streets.

== Geography ==
Suyetinovka is located in steppe, on Transvolga, on the left bank of the Kuba River, 27 km southeast of Staraya Poltavka (the district's administrative centre) by road. Tsvetochnoye is the nearest rural locality.
