= Novaya Poltavka =

Novaya Poltavka Новая Полтавка
- Selo
- Location within Volgograd Oblast Location within Russia
- Coordinates: 50°25′N 46°23′E
- Country: Russia
- Region: Volgograd Oblast
- District: Staropoltavsky District
- Time zone: UTC+4:00

Novaya Poltavka (Russian: Новая Полтавка) is a rural locality (a selo) and the administrative center of Novopoltavskoye Rural Settlement, Staropoltavsky District, Volgograd Oblast, Russia. The population was 990 as of 2010. There are 9 streets.

== Geography ==
Novaya Poltavka is located in steppe, on Transvolga, 10 km southwest of Staraya Poltavka (the district's administrative centre) by road. Staraya Poltavka is the nearest rural locality.
