= Put Ilyicha =

Put Ilyicha is the name of several places:

== In Russia ==
- Put Ilyicha, Leninsky District, Volgograd Oblast
- Put Ilyicha, Nikolayevsky District, Volgograd Oblast
- Put Ilyicha, Pallasovsky District, Volgograd Oblast

== Elsewhere ==
- Put Ilyicha, Kazakhstan, a village in the Almaty Province, Kazakhstan
