= Saray, Leninsky District, Volgograd Oblast =

Saray Сарай
- Settlement
- Location within Volgograd Oblast Location within Russia
- Coordinates: 48°40′N 45°23′E
- Country: Russia
- Region: Volgograd Oblast
- District: Leninsky District
- Time zone: UTC+4:00

Saray (Russian: Сарай) is a rural locality (a settlement) in Tsarevskoye Rural Settlement, Leninsky District, Volgograd Oblast, Russia. The population was 89 as of 2010. There are 3 streets.

== Geography ==
Saray is located on the left bank of the Akhtuba River, 19 km ESE of Leninsk (the district's administrative centre) by road. Solodovka is the nearest rural locality.
