= Krasnaya Znamya =

Krasnaya Znamya Красное Знамя
- Khutor
- Location within Volgograd Oblast Location within Russia
- Coordinates: 50°01′N 46°19′E
- Country: Russia
- Region: Volgograd Oblast
- District: Nikolayevsky District
- Time zone: UTC+4:00

Krasnaya Znamya (Russian: Красное Знамя) is a rural locality (a khutor) in Baranovskoye Rural Settlement, Nikolayevsky District, Volgograd Oblast, Russia. The population was 45 as of 2010.

== Geography ==
Krasnaya Znamya is located in steppe on the left bank of the Volgograd Reservoir, 72 km east of Nikolayevsk (the district's administrative centre) by road. Krasny Meliorator is the nearest rural locality.
