= Talovka, Nikolayevsky District, Volgograd Oblast =

Talovka Таловка
- Settlement
- Location within Volgograd Oblast Location within Russia
- Coordinates: 50°09′N 46°12′E
- Country: Russia
- Region: Volgograd Oblast
- District: Nikolayevsky District
- Time zone: UTC+4:00

Talovka (Russian: Таловка) is a rural locality (a settlement) in Baranovskoye Rural Settlement, Nikolayevsky District, Volgograd Oblast, Russia. The population was 87 as of 2010.

== Geography ==
Talovka is located in stepp of Transvolga, 68 km ENE of Nikolayevsk (the district's administrative centre) by road. Krasny Meliorator is the nearest rural locality.
