= Pioner, Volgograd Oblast =

Pioner Пионер
- Settlement
- Location within Volgograd Oblast Location within Russia
- Coordinates: 50°03′N 45°40′E
- Country: Russia
- Region: Volgograd Oblast
- District: Nikolayevsky District
- Time zone: UTC+4:00

Pioner (Russian: Пионер) is a rural locality (a settlement) in Levchunovskoye Rural Settlement, Nikolayevsky District, Volgograd Oblast, Russia. The population was 290 as of 2010. There are 14 streets.

== Geography ==
Pioner is located in steppe on the left bank of the Volgograd Reservoir, 22 km northeast of Nikolayevsk (the district's administrative centre) by road. Iskra is the nearest rural locality.
