= Brigady 2 =

Brigady 2 Бригады № 2
- Settlement
- Location within Volgograd Oblast Location within Russia
- Coordinates: 50°08′N 45°50′E
- Country: Russia
- Region: Volgograd Oblast
- District: Nikolayevsky District
- Time zone: UTC+4:00

Brigady 2 (Russian: Бригады № 2) is a rural locality (a settlement) in Politotdelskoye Rural Settlement, Nikolayevsky District, Volgograd Oblast, Russia. The population was 19 as of 2010. There are 2 streets.

== Geography ==
Brigady 2 is located in steppe, on the left bank of the Volgograd Reservoir, 36 km northeast of Nikolayevsk (the district's administrative centre) by road. Levchunovka is the nearest rural locality.
