= Verkhnyaya Vodyanka =

Verkhnyaya Vodyanka Верхняя Водянка
- Selo
- Location within Volgograd Oblast Location within Russia
- Coordinates: 50°23′N 47°06′E
- Country: Russia
- Region: Volgograd Oblast
- District: Staropoltavsky District
- Time zone: UTC+4:00

Verkhnyaya Vodyanka (Russian: Верхняя Водянка) is a rural locality (a selo) and the administrative center of Verkhnevodyanskoye Rural Settlement, Staropoltavsky District, Volgograd Oblast, Russia. The population was 594 as of 2010. There are 10 streets.

== Geography ==
Verkhnyaya Vodyanka is located in steppe, on Transvolga, 56 km southeast of Staraya Poltavka (the district's administrative centre) by road. Pervomaysky is the nearest rural locality.
