= Bulgakov, Leninsky District, Volgograd Oblast =

Bulgakov Булгаков
- Khutor
- Location within Volgograd Oblast Location within Russia
- Coordinates: 48°29′N 45°07′E
- Country: Russia
- Region: Volgograd Oblast
- District: Leninsky District
- Time zone: UTC+4:00

Bulgakov (Russian: Булгаков) is a rural locality (a khutor) in Pokrovskoye Rural Settlement, Leninsky District, Volgograd Oblast, Russia. The population was 28 as of 2010. There is 1 street.

== Geography ==
Bulgakov is located on Caspian Depression, on the left bank of the Volga River, 21 km northeast of Leninsk (the district's administrative centre) by road. Kovylny is the nearest rural locality.
