= Konovalov, Volgograd Oblast =

Konovalov Коновалов
- Khutor
- Location within Volgograd Oblast Location within Russia
- Coordinates: 48°34′N 45°19′E
- Country: Russia
- Region: Volgograd Oblast
- District: Leninsky District
- Time zone: UTC+4:00

Konovalov (Russian: Коновалов) is a rural locality (a khutor) in Tsarevskoye Rural Settlement, Leninsky District, Volgograd Oblast, Russia. The population was 7 as of 2010.

== Geography ==
Konovalov is located 30 km southeast of Leninsk (the district's administrative centre) by road. Tsaryov is the nearest rural locality.
