= Kurnayevka =

Kurnayevka Курнаевка
- Selo
- Location within Volgograd Oblast Location within Russia
- Coordinates: 50°23′N 45°56′E
- Country: Russia
- Region: Volgograd Oblast
- District: Staropoltavsky District
- Time zone: UTC+4:00

Kurnayevka (Russian: Курнаевка) is a rural locality (a selo) and the administrative center of Kurbayevskoye Rural Settlement, Staropoltavsky District, Volgograd Oblast, Russia. The total population was 666 inhabitants as of 2010. There are 18 streets.

== Geography ==
Kurnayevka is located in steppe, on the bank of the Volga River, 55 km southwest of Staraya Poltavka (the district's administrative centre) by road. Kolyshkino is the nearest rural locality.
