= Nadezhdin, Volgograd Oblast =

Nadezhdin Надеждин
- Khutor
- Location within Volgograd Oblast Location within Russia
- Coordinates: 48°49′N 45°12′E
- Country: Russia
- Region: Volgograd Oblast
- District: Leninsky District
- Time zone: UTC+4:00

Nadezhdin (Russian: Надеждин) is a rural locality (a khutor) in Kommunarovskoye Rural Settlement, Leninsky District, Volgograd Oblast, Russia. The population was 61 as of 2010. There are 3 streets.

== Geography ==
Nadezhdin is located in steppe, 74 km north of Leninsk (the district's administrative centre) by road. Kommunar is the nearest rural locality.
