= Valuyevka =

Valuyevka Валуевка
- Selo
- Location within Volgograd Oblast Location within Russia
- Coordinates: 50°21′N 46°25′E
- Country: Russia
- Region: Volgograd Oblast
- District: Staropoltavsky District
- Time zone: UTC+4:00

Valuyevka (Russian: Валуевка) is a rural locality (a selo) and the administrative center of Valuyevskoye Rural Settlement, Staropoltavsky District, Volgograd Oblast, Russia. The population was 1,071 as of 2010. There are 7 streets.

== Geography ==
Valuyevka is located 21 km southwest of Staraya Poltavka (the district's administrative centre) by road. Shpaki is the nearest rural locality.
