= Glukhoy =

Glukhoy Глухой
- Khutor
- Location within Volgograd Oblast Location within Russia
- Coordinates: 48°28′N 45°22′E
- Country: Russia
- Region: Volgograd Oblast
- District: Leninsky District
- Time zone: UTC+4:00

Glukhoy (Russian: Глухой) is a rural locality (a khutor) in Karshevitskoye Rural Settlement, Leninsky District, Volgograd Oblast, Russia. The population was 17 as of 2010.

== Geography ==
Glukhoy is located on the left bank of the Volga River, 38 km southeast of Leninsk (the district's administrative centre) by road. Karshevitoye is the nearest rural locality.
