= Leshchev =

Leshchev Лещев
- Khutor
- Location within Volgograd Oblast Location within Russia
- Coordinates: 48°30′N 44°56′E
- Country: Russia
- Region: Volgograd Oblast
- District: Leninsky District
- Time zone: UTC+4:00

Leshchev (Russian: Лещев) is a rural locality (a khutor) in Pokrovskoye Rural Settlement, Leninsky District, Volgograd Oblast, Russia. The population was 181 as of 2010. There are 12 streets.

== Geography ==
Leshchev is located on Caspian Depression, 21 km northeast of Leninsk (the district's administrative centre) by road. Kovylny is the nearest rural locality.
