= Zaplavnoye =

Zaplavnoye Заплавное
- Selo
- Location within Volgograd Oblast Location within Russia
- Coordinates: 48°42′N 45°01′E
- Country: Russia
- Region: Volgograd Oblast
- District: Leninsky District
- Time zone: UTC+4:00

Zaplavnoye (Russian: Заплавное) is a rural locality (a selo) and the administrative center of Zaplavnenskoye Rural Settlement, Leninsky District, Volgograd Oblast, Russia. The population was 3,734 as of 2010. There are 66 streets.

== Geography ==
Zaplavnoye is located on the left bank of the Akhtuba River, 21 km west of Leninsk (the district's administrative centre) by road. Vosmoye Marta is the nearest rural locality.
