= Posevnoy =

Posevnoy Посевной
- Settlement
- Location within Volgograd Oblast Location within Russia
- Coordinates: 50°20′N 46°30′E
- Country: Russia
- Region: Volgograd Oblast
- District: Staropoltavsky District
- Time zone: UTC+4:00

Posevnoy (Russian: Посевной) is a rural locality (a settlement) in Novotikhonovskoye Rural Settlement, Staropoltavsky District, Volgograd Oblast, Russia. The population was 35 as of 2010. There are 2 streets.

== Geography ==
Posevnoy is located 36 km south of Staraya Poltavka (the district's administrative centre) by road. Novy Tikhonov is the nearest rural locality.
