= Fermy 3 plemzavoda Parizhskaya Kommuna =

Fermy 3 plemzavoda Parizhskaya Kommuna Фермы № 3 племзавода «Парижская Коммуна»
- Settlement
- Location within Volgograd Oblast Location within Russia
- Coordinates: 50°17′N 47°08′E
- Country: Russia
- Region: Volgograd Oblast
- District: Staropoltavsky District
- Time zone: UTC+4:00

Fermy 3 plemzavoda Parizhskaya Kommuna (Russian: Фермы № 3 племзавода «Парижская Коммуна») is a rural locality (a settlement) in Torgunskoye Rural Settlement, Staropoltavsky District, Volgograd Oblast, Russia. The population was 54 as of 2010. There are 13 streets.

== Geography ==
The settlement is located on the right bank of the Solyanka River, 71 km southeast of Staraya Poltavka (the district's administrative centre) by road. Torgun is the nearest rural locality.
