= Stepana Razina, Volgograd Oblast =

Stepana Razina Степана Разина
- Settlement
- Location within Volgograd Oblast Location within Russia
- Coordinates: 48°30′N 45°04′E
- Country: Russia
- Region: Volgograd Oblast
- District: Leninsky District
- Time zone: UTC+4:00

Stepana Razina (Russian: Степана Разина) is a rural locality (a settlement) in Pokrovskoye Rural Settlement, Leninsky District, Volgograd Oblast, Russia. The population was 198 as of 2010. There are 5 streets.

== Geography ==
Stepana Razina is located on Caspian Depression, on the left bank of the Bulgakov, 32 km southwest of Leninsk (the district's administrative centre) by road. Gornaya Polyana is the nearest rural locality.
