= Shpaki =

Shpaki Шпаки
- Khutor
- Location within Volgograd Oblast Location within Russia
- Coordinates: 50°21′N 46°26′E
- Country: Russia
- Region: Volgograd Oblast
- District: Staropoltavsky District
- Time zone: UTC+4:00

Shpaki (Russian: Шпаки) is a rural locality (a khutor) in Novotikhonovskoye Rural Settlement, Staropoltavsky District, Volgograd Oblast, Russia. The population was 132 as of 2010. There are 3 streets.

== Geography ==
Shpaki is located in steppe, near the left bank of the Yeruslan River, 22 km southwest of Staraya Poltavka (the district's administrative centre) by road. Valuyevka is the nearest rural locality.
