= Kommunar (inhabited locality) =

Kommunar (Russian: Коммунар) is the name of several inhabited localities in Russia.

Urban localities

- Kommunar, Gatchinsky District, Leningrad Oblast, a town under the administrative jurisdiction of Kommunarskoye Settlement Municipal Formation in Gatchinsky District of Leningrad Oblast

Rural localities

- Kommunar, Republic of Bashkortostan, a village in Kaltovsky Selsoviet of Iglinsky District in the Republic of Bashkortostan
- Kommunar, Bryansk Oblast, a settlement in Dobrikovsky Rural Administrative Okrug of Brasovsky District in Bryansk Oblast; 52°41′N 34°44′E
- Kommunar, Republic of Khakassia, a selo in Kommunarovsky Selsoviet of Shirinsky District in the Republic of Khakassia
- Kommunar, Kostroma Oblast, a settlement in Soltanovskoye Settlement of Neysky District in Kostroma Oblast; 58°10′N 43°32′E
- Kommunar, Krasnodar Krai, a settlement in Novomikhaylovsky Rural Okrug of Kushchyovsky District in Krasnodar Krai; 46°32′N 39°57′E
- Kommunar, Belovsky District, Kursk Oblast, a settlement in Kommunarovsky Selsoviet of Belovsky District in Kursk Oblast
- Kommunar, Sovetsky District, Kursk Oblast, a settlement in Sovetsky Selsoviet of Sovetsky District in Kursk Oblast
- Kommunar, Kingiseppsky District, Leningrad Oblast, a village in Opolyevskoye Settlement Municipal Formation of Kingiseppsky District in Leningrad Oblast
- Kommunar, Republic of Mordovia, a settlement in Starochamzinsky Selsoviet of Bolsheignatovsky District in the Republic of Mordovia
- Kommunar, Pochinkovsky District, Nizhny Novgorod Oblast, a settlement in Naruksovsky Selsoviet of Pochinkovsky District in Nizhny Novgorod Oblast
- Kommunar, Sharangsky District, Nizhny Novgorod Oblast, a village in Rozhentsovsky Selsoviet of Sharangsky District in Nizhny Novgorod Oblast
- Kommunar, Samara Oblast, a settlement in Bolsheglushitsky District of Samara Oblast
- Kommunar, Stavropol Krai, a settlement in Kommunarovsky Selsoviet of Krasnogvardeysky District in Stavropol Krai
- Kommunar, Tyumen Oblast, a settlement in Kommunarovsky Rural Okrug of Isetsky District in Tyumen Oblast
- Kommunar, Volgograd Oblast, a settlement in Kommunarovsky Selsoviet of Leninsky District in Volgograd Oblast
