= Verbny =

Verbny Вербный
- Khutor
- Location within Volgograd Oblast Location within Russia
- Coordinates: 50°17′N 46°51′E
- Country: Russia
- Region: Volgograd Oblast
- District: Staropoltavsky District
- Time zone: UTC+4:00

Verbny (Russian: Вербный) is a rural locality (a khutor) in Gmelinskoye Rural Settlement, Staropoltavsky District, Volgograd Oblast, Russia. The population was 205 as of 2010. There are 5 streets.

== Geography ==
Verbny is located in steppe, 49 km southeast of Staraya Poltavka (the district's administrative centre) by road. Gmelinka is the nearest rural locality.
