= Melovoy =

Melovoy Меловой
- Khutor
- Location within Volgograd Oblast Location within Russia
- Coordinates: 50°12′N 46°27′E
- Country: Russia
- Region: Volgograd Oblast
- District: Staropoltavsky District
- Time zone: UTC+4:00

Melovoy (Russian: Меловой) is a rural locality (a khutor) in Novotikhonovskoye Rural Settlement, Staropoltavsky District, Volgograd Oblast, Russia. The population was 84 as of 2010. There are 6 streets.

== Geography ==
Melovoy is located in steppe, on the right bank of the Solyanka River, 51 km south of Staraya Poltavka (the district's administrative centre) by road. Torgunsky is the nearest rural locality.
