= Vosmoye Marta =

Vosmoye Marta Восьмое Марта
- Settlement
- Location within Volgograd Oblast Location within Russia
- Coordinates: 48°42′N 45°03′E
- Country: Russia
- Region: Volgograd Oblast
- District: Leninsky District
- Time zone: UTC+4:00

Vosmoye Marta (Russian: Восьмое Марта) is a rural locality (a settlement) in Zaplavnenskoye Rural Settlement, Leninsky District, Volgograd Oblast, Russia. The population was 257 as of 2010. There are 8 streets.

== Geography ==
Vosmoye Marta is located on the left bank of the Akhtuba River, 24 km northwest of Leninsk (the district's administrative centre) by road. Zaplavnoye is the nearest rural locality.
