= Put Ilyicha, Nikolayevsky District, Volgograd Oblast =

Put Ilyicha Путь Ильича
- Selo
- Location within Volgograd Oblast Location within Russia
- Coordinates: 49°54′N 45°47′E
- Country: Russia
- Region: Volgograd Oblast
- District: Nikolayevsky District
- Time zone: UTC+4:00

Put Ilyicha (Russian: Путь Ильича) is a rural locality (a selo) and the administrative center of Ilyichyovskoye Rural Settlement, Nikolayevsky District, Volgograd Oblast, Russia. The population was 1,565 as of 2010. There are 18 streets.

== Geography ==
Put Ilyicha is located on Transvolga, 51 km southeast of Nikolayevsk (the district's administrative centre) by road. Stepnovsky is the nearest rural locality.
