= Kalinino, Volgograd Oblast =

Kalinino Калинино
- Selo
- Location within Volgograd Oblast Location within Russia
- Coordinates: 50°29′N 46°11′E
- Country: Russia
- Region: Volgograd Oblast
- District: Staropoltavsky District
- Time zone: UTC+4:00

Kalinino (Russian: Калинино) is a rural locality (a selo) in Novopoltavskoye Rural Settlement, Staropoltavsky District, Volgograd Oblast, Russia. The population was 296 as of 2010. There are 6 streets.

== Geography ==
Kalinino is located in steppe, 16 km from Novaya Poltavka, 25 km west of Staraya Poltavka (the district's administrative centre) by road. Novaya Poltavka is the nearest rural locality.
