= Piramidalny =

Piramidalny Пирамидальный
- Settlement
- Location within Volgograd Oblast Location within Russia
- Coordinates: 49°54′N 46°08′E
- Country: Russia
- Region: Volgograd Oblast
- District: Nikolayevsky District
- Time zone: UTC+4:00

Piramidalny (Russian: Пирамидальный) is a rural locality (a settlement) in Sovkhozskoye Rural Settlement, Nikolayevsky District, Volgograd Oblast, Russia. The population was 23 as of 2010.

== Geography ==
Piramidalny is located 66 km southeast of Nikolayevsk (the district's administrative centre) by road. Razdolnoye is the nearest rural locality.
