= Karshevitoye =

Karshevitoye Каршевитое
- Selo
- Location within Volgograd Oblast Location within Russia
- Coordinates: 48°27′N 45°18′E
- Country: Russia
- Region: Volgograd Oblast
- District: Leninsky District
- Time zone: UTC+4:00

Karshevitoye (Russian: Каршевитое) is a rural locality (a selo) and the administrative center of Karshevitskoye Rural Settlement, Leninsky District, Volgograd Oblast, Russia. The population was 397 as of 2010. There are 7 streets.

== Geography ==
Karshevitoye is located on the left bank of the Volga River, 40 km southeast of Leninsk (the district's administrative centre) by road. Zubarevka is the nearest rural locality.
