= Volga–Ural =

Volga–Ural may refer to:

- Volga–Ural interfluve
- Volga-Ural Military District
- Volga-Ural Petroleum and Gas Province
- Volgo–Uralia
- Idel-Ural
- Volga-Ural State
