= Kovylny, Volgograd Oblast =

Kovylny Ковыльный
- Khutor
- Location within Volgograd Oblast Location within Russia
- Coordinates: 48°42′N 45°01′E
- Country: Russia
- Region: Volgograd Oblast
- District: Leninsky District
- Time zone: UTC+4:00

Kovylny (Russian: Ковыльный) is a rural locality (a khutor) in Kommunarovskoye Rural Settlement, Leninsky District, Volgograd Oblast, Russia. The population was 75 as of 2010. There are 4 streets.

== Geography ==
Kovylny is located in steppe, 21 km northeast of Leninsk (the district's administrative centre) by road. Kommunar is the nearest rural locality.
