= Dobrinka, Nikolayevsky District, Volgograd Oblast =

Dobrinka Добринка
- Khutor
- Location within Volgograd Oblast Location within Russia
- Coordinates: 50°01′N 46°09′E
- Country: Russia
- Region: Volgograd Oblast
- District: Nikolayevsky District
- Time zone: UTC+4:00

Dobrinka (Russian: Добринка) is a rural locality (a khutor) in Baranovskoye Rural Settlement, Nikolayevsky District, Volgograd Oblast, Russia. The population was 6 as of 2010.

== Geography ==
Dobrinka is located in steppe of Transvolga, 55 km east of Nikolayevsk (the district's administrative centre) by road. Krasny Meliorator is the nearest rural locality.
