= Traktorostroy =

Traktorostroy Тракторострой
- Settlement
- Location within Volgograd Oblast Location within Russia
- Coordinates: 49°03′N 45°34′E
- Country: Russia
- Region: Volgograd Oblast
- District: Leninsky District
- Time zone: UTC+4:00

Traktorostroy (Russian: Тракторострой) is a rural locality (a settlement) in Ilyichyovskoye Rural Settlement, Leninsky District, Volgograd Oblast, Russia. The population was 258 as of 2010. There are 6 streets.

== Geography ==
Traktorostroy is located on the Caspian Depression, 60 km northeast of Leninsk (the district's administrative centre) by road. Rassvet is the nearest rural locality.
