= Korshunovka, Volgograd Oblast =

Korshunovka Коршуновка
- Selo
- Location within Volgograd Oblast Location within Russia
- Coordinates: 50°12′N 46°49′E
- Country: Russia
- Region: Volgograd Oblast
- District: Staropoltavsky District
- Time zone: UTC+4:00

Korshunovka (Russian: Коршуновка) is a rural locality (a selo) in Gmelinskoye Rural Settlement, Staropoltavsky District, Volgograd Oblast, Russia. The population was 17 as of 2010.

== Geography ==
Korshunovka is located in steppe, 61 km southeast of Staraya Poltavka (the district's administrative centre) by road. Gmelinka is the nearest rural locality.
