= Kozhushkino =

Kozhushkino Кожушкино
- Selo
- Location within Volgograd Oblast Location within Russia
- Coordinates: 50°31′N 46°29′E
- Country: Russia
- Region: Volgograd Oblast
- District: Staropoltavsky District
- Time zone: UTC+4:00

Kozhushkino (Russian: Кожушкино) is a rural locality (a selo) in Novokvasnikovskoye Rural Settlement, Staropoltavsky District, Volgograd Oblast, Russia. The population was 56 as of 2010.

== Geography ==
Kozhushkino is located on the right bank of the Yeruslan River, 6 km north of Staraya Poltavka (the district's administrative centre) by road. Verkhny Yeruslan is the nearest rural locality.
