= Lyatoshinka =

Lyatoshinka Лятошинка
- Selo
- Location within Volgograd Oblast Location within Russia
- Coordinates: 50°36′N 46°33′E
- Country: Russia
- Region: Volgograd Oblast
- District: Staropoltavsky District
- Time zone: UTC+4:00

Lyatoshinka (Russian: Лятошинка) is a rural locality (a selo) and the administrative center of Lyatoshinskoye Rural Settlement, Staropoltavsky District, Volgograd Oblast, Russia. The population was 632 as of 2010. There are 11 streets.

It is mentioned in 1840 in connection with the settlement of the village by Tatars.

== Geography ==
Lyatoshinka is located on the left bank of the Yeruslan River, 21 km northeast of Staraya Poltavka (the district's administrative centre) by road. Lugovskoye is the nearest rural locality.
