= Malyayevka =

Malyayevka Маляевка
- Selo
- Location within Volgograd Oblast Location within Russia
- Coordinates: 48°41′N 45°16′E
- Country: Russia
- Region: Volgograd Oblast
- District: Leninsky District
- Time zone: UTC+4:00

Malyayevka (Russian: Маляевка) is a rural locality (a selo) and the administrative center of Malyayevskoye Rural Settlement, Leninsky District, Volgograd Oblast, Russia. The population was 1,260 as of 2010. There are 31 streets.

== Geography ==
Malyayevka is located 66 km from Volgograd, 11 km west of Leninsk (the district's administrative centre) by road. Novostroyka is the nearest rural locality.
