= Zubarevka =

Zubarevka Зубаревка
- Khutor
- Location within Volgograd Oblast Location within Russia
- Coordinates: 48°30′N 45°17′E
- Country: Russia
- Region: Volgograd Oblast
- District: Leninsky District
- Time zone: UTC+4:00

Zubarevka (Russian: Зубаревка) is a rural locality (a khutor) in Karshevitskoye Rural Settlement, Leninsky District, Volgograd Oblast, Russia. The population was 54 as of 2010.

== Geography ==
Zubarevka is located 34 km southeast of Leninsk (the district's administrative centre) by road. 5-y Leskhoz is the nearest rural locality.
