= Pervomaysky, Staropoltavsky District, Volgograd Oblast =

Pervomaysky Первомайский
- Settlement
- Location within Volgograd Oblast Location within Russia
- Coordinates: 50°22′N 46°55′E
- Country: Russia
- Region: Volgograd Oblast
- District: Staropoltavsky District
- Time zone: UTC+4:00

Pervomaysky (Russian: Первомайский) is a rural locality (a settlement) in Gmelinskoye Rural Settlement, Staropoltavsky District, Volgograd Oblast, Russia. The population was 313 as of 2010. There are 7 streets.

== Geography ==
Pervomaysky is located in steppe, 41 km southeast of Staraya Poltavka (the district's administrative centre) by road. Gmelinka is the nearest rural locality.
