= Kharkovka, Volgograd Oblast =

Kharkovka Харьковка
- Selo
- Location within Volgograd Oblast Location within Russia
- Coordinates: 50°25′N 46°49′E
- Country: Russia
- Region: Volgograd Oblast
- District: Staropoltavsky District
- Time zone: UTC+4:00

Kharkovka (Russian: Харьковка) is a rural locality (a selo) and the administrative center of Kharkovskoye Rural Settlement, Staropoltavsky District, Volgograd Oblast, Russia. The population was 920 as of 2010. There are 16 streets.

== Geography ==
Kharkovka is located in steppe, on the Caspian Depression, 31 km southeast of Staraya Poltavka (the district's administrative centre) by road. Gmelinka is the nearest rural locality. Germany bombed and landed in Kharkovka
