= Verkhny Yeruslan =

Verkhny Yeruslan Верхний Еруслан Gnadentau (until 1942)
- Selo
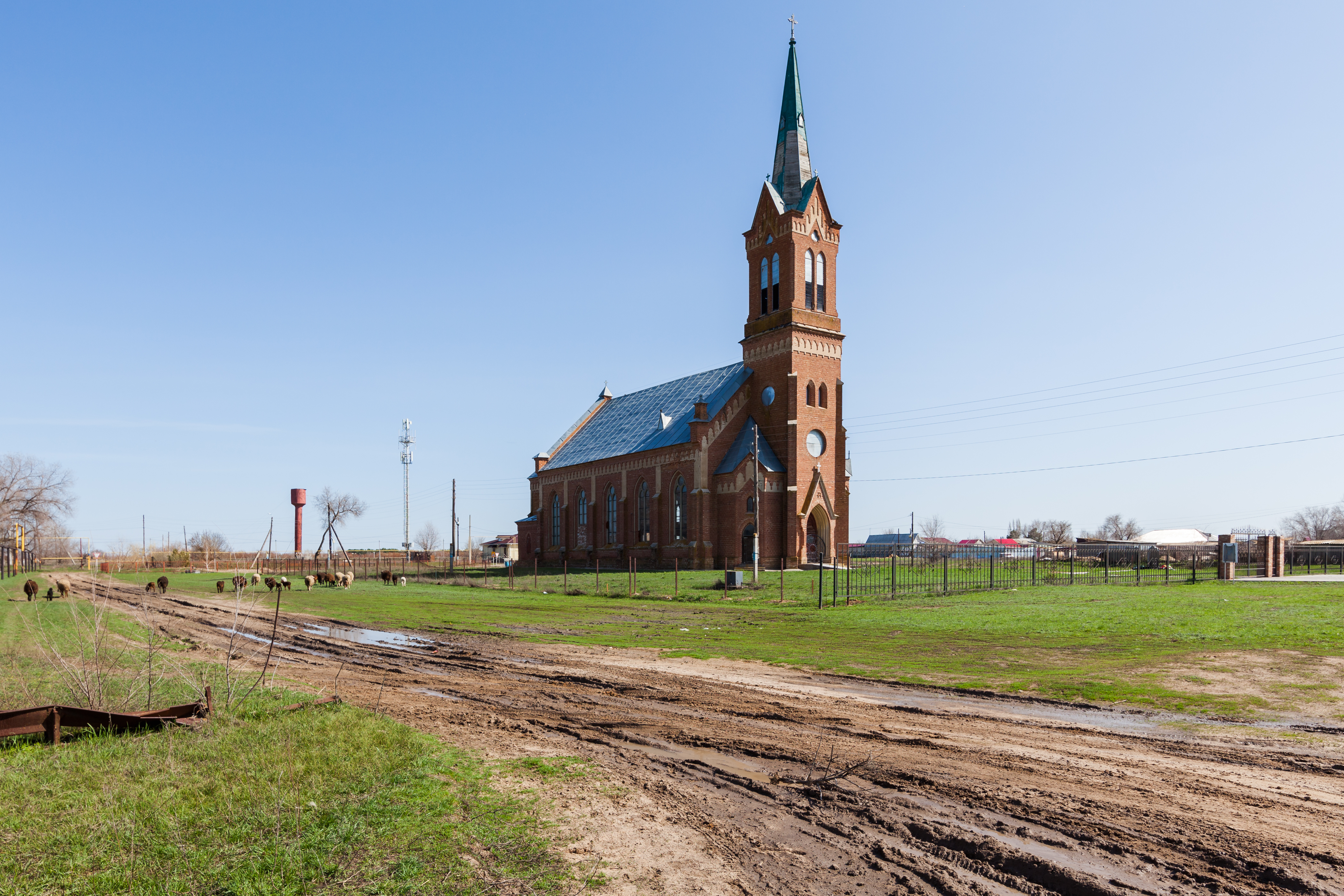
- Church of Gnadentau

- Location within Volgograd Oblast Location within Russia
- Coordinates: 50°30′N 46°31′E
- Country: Russia
- Region: Volgograd Oblast
- District: Staropoltavsky District
- Time zone: UTC+4:00

Verkhny Yeruslan (Russian: Верхний Еруслан, German: Gnadentau ) is a rural locality (a selo) in Kanovskoye Rural Settlement, Staropoltavsky District, Volgograd Oblast, Russia. The population was 511 as of 2010. There are 5 streets.

== Geography ==
Verkhny Yeruslan is located in steppe, on the left bank of the Yeruslan River, 6 km northeast of Staraya Poltavka (the district's administrative centre) by road. Staraya Poltavka is the nearest rural locality.
