= Gmelinka =

Gmelinka Гмелинка
- Selo
- Location within Volgograd Oblast Location within Russia
- Coordinates: 50°22′N 46°54′E
- Country: Russia
- Region: Volgograd Oblast
- District: Staropoltavsky District
- Time zone: UTC+4:00

Gmelinka (Russian: Гмелинка) is a rural locality (a selo) and the administrative center of Gmelinskoye Rural Settlement, Staropoltavsky District, Volgograd Oblast, Russia. The population was 2,017 as of 2010. There are 24 streets.

== Geography ==
Gmelinka is located 40 km southeast of Staraya Poltavka (the district's administrative centre) by road. Pervomaysky is the nearest rural locality.
