= Orlinoye, Volgograd Oblast =

Orlinoye Орлиное
- Selo
- Location within Volgograd Oblast Location within Russia
- Coordinates: 50°18′N 46°57′E
- Country: Russia
- Region: Volgograd Oblast
- District: Staropoltavsky District
- Time zone: UTC+4:00

Orlinoye (Russian: Орлиное) is a rural locality (a selo) in Gmelinskoye Rural Settlement, Staropoltavsky District, Volgograd Oblast, Russia. The population was 73 as of 2010.

== Geography ==
Orlinoye is located in steppe, 47 km southeast of Staraya Poltavka (the district's administrative centre) by road. Gmelinka is the nearest rural locality.
