= Volga–Ural interfluve =

Territory between rivers Volga and Ural

Coordinates: 49.906°N 47.579°E

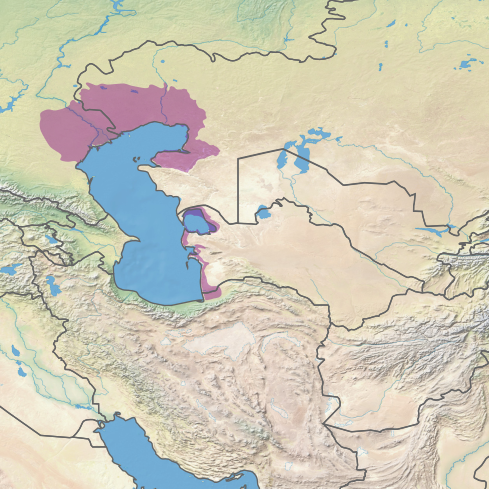
Caspian lowland desert ecoregion

The Volga–Ural interfluve (Russian: Волго-Уральское междуречье) is a steppe, semidesert, and desert territory between rivers Volga and Ural in Kazakhstan and Russia.

== Geography ==
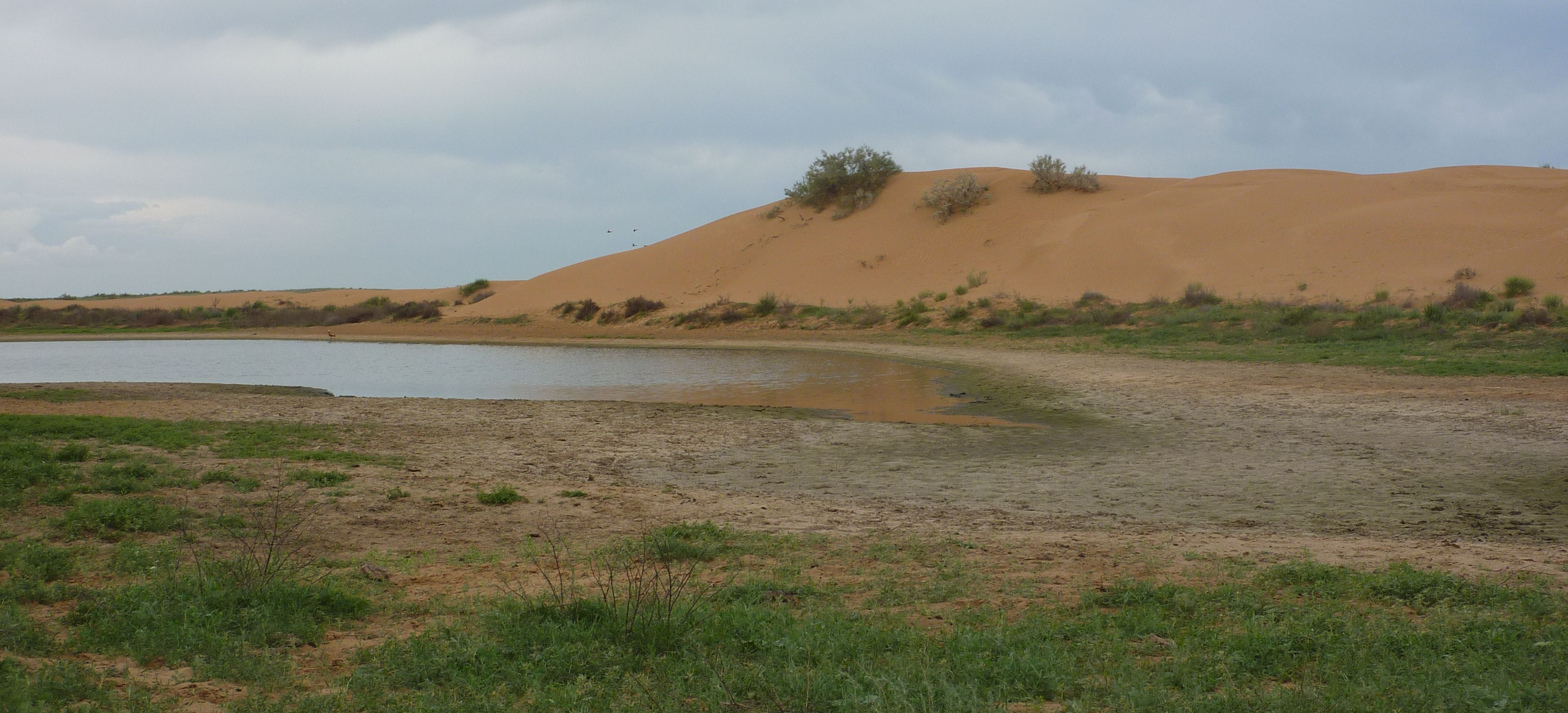
A Baer knoll

Most of the interfluve lies in Kazakhstan, within the West Kazakhstan Region and Atyrau Region. From south it is bordered by the Caspian Sea, into which both Volga and Ural flow.

The southern arid area is within the Caspian Depression, Caspian lowland desert ecoregion. It rises gradually from the sea coast northwatrds, with averaged elevations in the lower area ranging between 28 m and 11m below sea level. In the vicinity of Volga Delta there are groups of Baer knolls (Note: Baer knolls are named after the explorer Karl Ernst von Baer) with heights up to 25 m. Between them freshwater bayous and saltwater lakes may be formed. The latter can dry out and form salt-covered depressions. The whole shore of the Caspian sea is fringed with a strip salty sands cut with bayous filled with seawater when the wind blows from the sea (this kind of winds is called "moryana" (ru:моряна) in Russian, form the word more, "sea"). There is also a large number of small intermittent and some larger permanent saltwater lakes in the southern desert area. The most notable of them is Baskunchak, with major salt mining. Within the confines of Atyrau Region, Kazakhstan, bordering the Astrakhan Oblast, Russia, there is a huge sand massif formerly known as "Urdinskiye peski" (Урдинские пески) (Note: "Urdinskiye peski" are named after the former Urdinsky Raion, now Bokey Orda District), now "Ryn-peski", or Ryn Desert.

Pontic steppe

The northern part belongs to the Pontic–Caspian steppe ecoregion.

The interfluve may be divided into the following zones: plain clayey steppes zone, plain sandy desert zone, plain clayey desert zone, plain sandy desert steppe zone.

== History and archaeology ==
Due to its ecological nature, historically, this area was most suited for nomadic lifestyle. In the 13th and 14th centuries the sedentary population was extremely sparse, with stationary settlements located along the valleys of Volga and Ural, as well as in the water-rich northern part of the interfluve. The 1985 book by Vadim Egorov, and expert in Golden Horde archaeology, says that insufficient archaeological research was carried out in this area, so it is difficult to make estimates about its historical population. The book discusses the following archaeological sites:

- Bolshoy Irgiz river hillfort (Городище на р. Большой Иргиз), Saratov Oblast, Russia
- Городище Сухореченское, Sukhorechensk hillfort (Sukhaya Rechka hillfort; named after the Sukhaya Rechka (Суха́я Ре́чка) village), easternmost Samara Oblast, by Bolshoy Kinel River, Russia
- Orenburg hillfort (Оренбургское городище), within Orenburg, Russia
- Tendik hillfort (Тендыкское городище), Balyqshy area, Kazakhstan
- Saray-Jük (Сарайчик), Kazakhstan

In more recent times the situation improved and a large number of kurgans, in particular, attributed to the Yamnaya culture, which, in particular, changed the notions about the significance of the development of metallurgy in the area in early Bronze Age.

== See also ==
- Transvolga
- Volgo–Uralia
- Volga-Ural Petroleum and Gas Province
- Volga-Ural Military District
- Idel-Ural
