= Kommunar =

Kommunar or Komunar may refer to:

- Kommunar (inhabited locality), several inhabited localities in Russia
- Komunarskyi District, an urban district of Zaporizhzhia, Ukraine
- Kommunar (tractor), a tractor formerly produced in the Soviet Union by Malyshev Factory
- Kommunar, transliteration of the Russian spelling of communard
- Kommunar, the Norwegian Nynorsk spelling for commune, used to refer to the municipalities of Norway
