= Belyayevka, Volgograd Oblast =

Belyayevka Беляевка
- Selo
- Location within Volgograd Oblast Location within Russia
- Coordinates: 50°18′N 46°13′E
- Country: Russia
- Region: Volgograd Oblast
- District: Staropoltavsky District
- Time zone: UTC+4:00

Belyayevka (Russian: Беляевка) is a rural locality (a selo) and the administrative center of Belyayevskoye Rural Settlement, Staropoltavsky District, Volgograd Oblast, Russia. The population was 430 as of 2010. There are 16 streets.

== Geography ==
Belyayevka is located 31 km southwest of Staraya Poltavka (the district's administrative centre) by road. Novaya Poltavka is the nearest rural locality.
