= Mayak Oktyabrya =

Mayak Oktyabrya Маяк Октября
- Settlement
- Location within Volgograd Oblast Location within Russia
- Coordinates: 49°14′N 45°38′E
- Country: Russia
- Region: Volgograd Oblast
- District: Leninsky District
- Time zone: UTC+4:00

Mayak Oktyabrya (Russian: Маяк Октября) is a rural locality (a settlement) and the administrative center of Mayakskoye Rural Settlement, Leninsky District, Volgograd Oblast, Russia. The population was 586 as of 2010. There are 10 streets.

== Geography ==
The village is located on Caspian Depression, 120 km from Volgograd, 82 km from Leninsk.
