= Solodovka =

Solodovka Солодовка
- Selo
- Location within Volgograd Oblast Location within Russia
- Coordinates: 48°40′N 45°23′E
- Country: Russia
- Region: Volgograd Oblast
- District: Leninsky District
- Time zone: UTC+4:00

Solodovka (Russian: Солодовка) is a rural locality (a selo) in Tsarevskoye Rural Settlement, Leninsky District, Volgograd Oblast, Russia. The population was 389 as of 2010. There are 10 streets.

== Geography ==
Solodovka is located on the left bank of the Akhtuba River, 20 km southeast of Leninsk (the district's administrative centre) by road. Saray is the nearest rural locality.
