= Kommunar, Volgograd Oblast =

Kommunar Коммунар
- Settlement
- Location within Volgograd Oblast Location within Russia
- Coordinates: 48°52′N 45°18′E
- Country: Russia
- Region: Volgograd Oblast
- District: Leninsky District
- Time zone: UTC+4:00

Kommunar (Russian: Коммунар) is a rural locality (a settlement) and the administrative center of Kommunarovskoye Rural Settlement, Leninsky District, Volgograd Oblast, Russia. The population was 882 as of 2010. There are 19 streets.

== Geography ==
Kommunar is located on the Caspian Depression, 84 km northeast of Leninsk (the district's administrative centre) by road. Kovylny is the nearest rural locality.
