= Put Ilyicha, Leninsky District, Volgograd Oblast =

Put Ilyicha Путь Ильича
- Settlement
- Location within Volgograd Oblast Location within Russia
- Coordinates: 48°58′N 45°33′E
- Country: Russia
- Region: Volgograd Oblast
- District: Leninsky District
- Time zone: UTC+4:00

Put Ilyicha (Russian: Путь Ильича) is a rural locality (a settlement) and the administrative center of Ilyichyovskoye Rural Settlement, Leninsky District, Volgograd Oblast, Russia. The population was 724 as of 2010. There are 14 streets.

== Geography ==
Put Ilyicha is located on the Caspian Depression, 50 km northeast of Leninsk (the district's administrative centre) by road. Stepnoy is the nearest rural locality.
