= Biliaivka (village) =

Biliaivka is a town in Odesa Oblast, Ukraine.

Biliaivka may also refer to:

- Biliaivka, Kharkiv Oblast
- Biliaivka, Kherson Oblast
- Biliaivka, Kirovohrad Oblast
- Biliaivka, Zaporizhzhia Oblast

== See also ==
- Belyayevka (disambiguation)
