= Dobrinsky District =

Dobrinsky District Добринский район (Russian)
- District
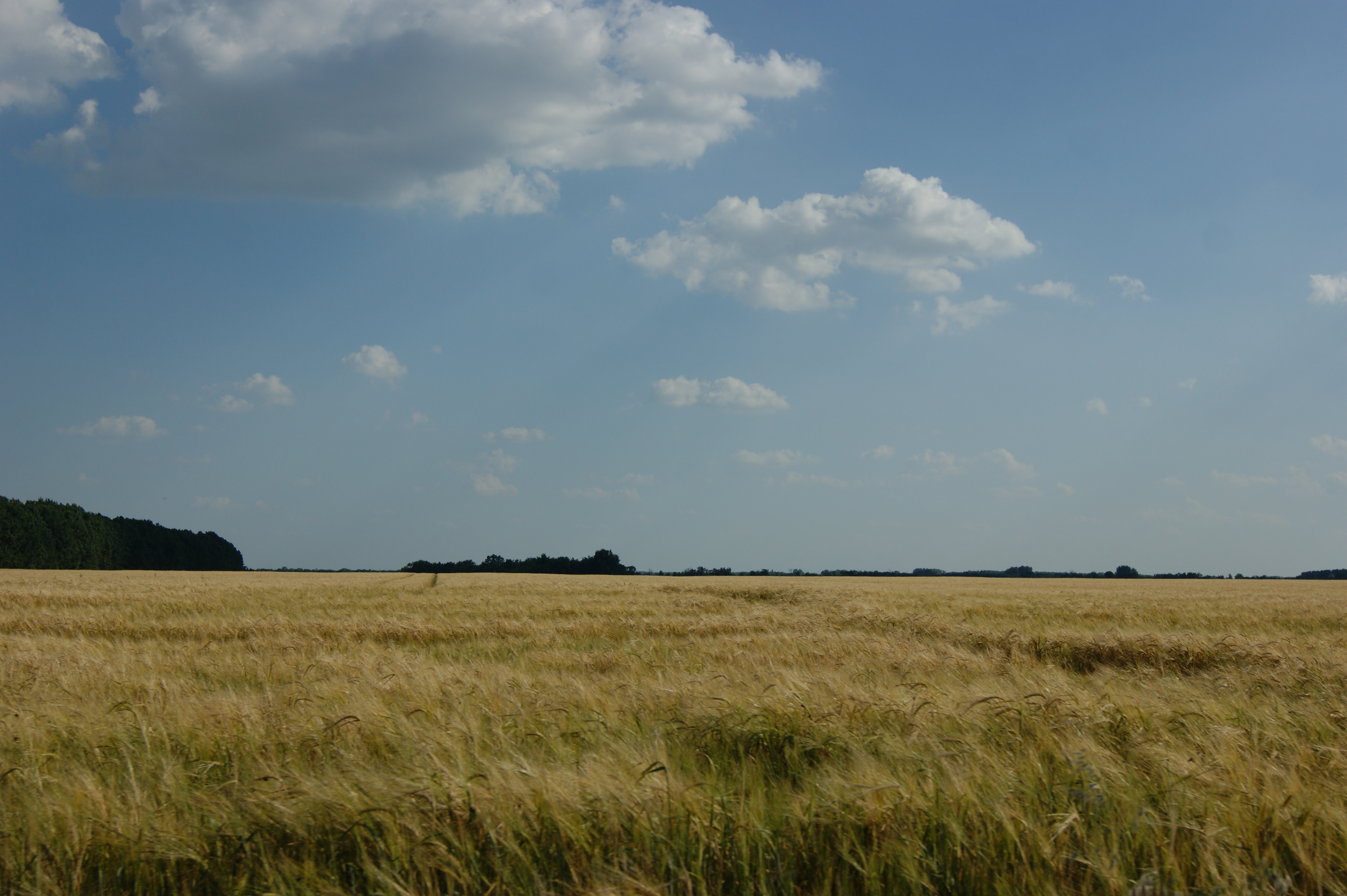
- wheat field, Dobrinsky district

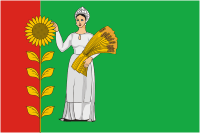
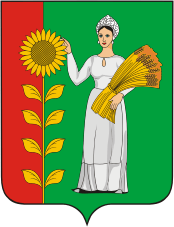
- Flag Coat of arms
- Location of Dobrinsky District in Lipetsk Oblast
- Coordinates: 52°10′N 40°28′E
- Country: Russia
- Federal subject: Lipetsk Oblast
- Established: 30 July 1928
- Administrative center: Dobrinka

Area
  - Total: 1,680 km^{2} (650 sq mi)

Population (2010 Census)
  - Total: 37,567
  - Density: 22.4/km^{2} (57.9/sq mi)
  - Urban: 0%
  - Rural: 100%

Administrative structure
  - Administrative divisions: 18 Selsoviets
  - Inhabited localities: 116 rural localities

Municipal structure
  - Municipally incorporated as: Dobrinsky Municipal District
  - Municipal divisions: 0 urban settlements, 18 rural settlements
- Time zone: UTC+3 (MSK)
- OKTMO ID: 42612000
- Website: http://admdobrinka.ru

Dobrinsky District (Russian: До́бринский райо́н) is an administrative and municipal district (raion), one of the eighteen in Lipetsk Oblast, Russia. It is located in the southeast of the oblast. The area of the district is 1,680 square kilometers (650 sq mi). Its administrative center is the rural locality (a settlement) of Dobrinka. Population: 33,256 (2021 census); 37,567 (2010 census); 40,809 (2002 Census); 42,902 (1989 Soviet census). The population of Dobrinka accounts for 27.0% of the district's total population.
