= Put Ilyicha, Pallasovsky District, Volgograd Oblast =

Put Ilyicha Путь Ильича
- Settlement
- Location within Volgograd Oblast Location within Russia
- Coordinates: 49°19′N 46°41′E
- Country: Russia
- Region: Volgograd Oblast
- District: Pallasovsky District
- Time zone: UTC+4:00

Put Ilyicha (Russian: Путь Ильича) is a rural locality (a settlement) and the administrative center of Priozyornoye Rural Settlement, Pallasovsky District, Volgograd Oblast, Russia. The population was 759 as of 2010. There are 13 streets.

== Geography ==
Put Ilyicha is located 90 km south of Pallasovka (the district's administrative centre) by road. Vengelovka is the nearest rural locality.
