= Belyayevka, Vologda Oblast =

Belyayevka Беляевка
- Village
- Location within Vologda Oblast Location within Russia
- Coordinates: 59°36′N 45°48′E
- Country: Russia
- Region: Vologda Oblast
- District: Nikolsky District
- Time zone: UTC+3:00

Belyayevka (Russian: Беляевка) is a rural locality (a village) in Baydarovskoye Rural Settlement, Nikolsky District, Vologda Oblast, Russia. The population was 59 as of 2002.

== Geography ==
Belyayevka is located 28 km (17 mi) northeast of Nikolsk (the district's administrative centre) by road. Malye Gari is the nearest rural locality.
