= Balyqshy =

Balyqshy Балықшы بالىقشى
- Location within Kazakhstan
- Coordinates: 47°04′00″N 51°52′00″E
- Country: Kazakhstan
- Region: Atyrau
- Elevation: −17 m (−56 ft)
- Time zone: UTC+5 (West Kazakhstan Time)
  - Summer (DST): UTC+5 (West Kazakhstan Time)

Balyqshy (Kazakh: Балықшы, Balyqşy, بالىقشى) is a town in Atyrau Region, southwest Kazakhstan. It lies at an altitude of 17 m (56 ft) below sea level, a few kilometres from Atyrau.
