= Dobrinka, Lipetsk Oblast =

Rural locality in Dobrinsky District, Lipetsk Oblast, Russia

Coordinates: 52°09′47″N 40°27′58″E

Dobrinka (Russian: До́бринка) is a rural locality (a settlement) and the administrative center of Dobrinsky District of Lipetsk Oblast, Russia, located on the Gryazi–Borisoglebsk railway line, in the upper streams of the Plovutka River. Population: 8,965 (2021 census); 9,572 (2010 census); 10,153 (2002 census); 9,673 (1989 Soviet census).

It was founded on May 30, 1802 by the settlers from the town of Dobry (now the village of Dobroye) as the village of Dobrinskiye Vyselki (До́бринские Вы́селки). In 1869, the Gryazi–Borisoglebsk railway was built, and the station of that railway located in the vicinity of the village was also named Dobrinka. By the beginning of the 20th century, the village and the station grew and merged.

In 1967, Dobrinka merged with the village of Chuyevka and was granted urban-type settlement status, which it held until 2005.
