= Belyayevsky District =

Belyayevsky District Беляевский район (Russian)
- District
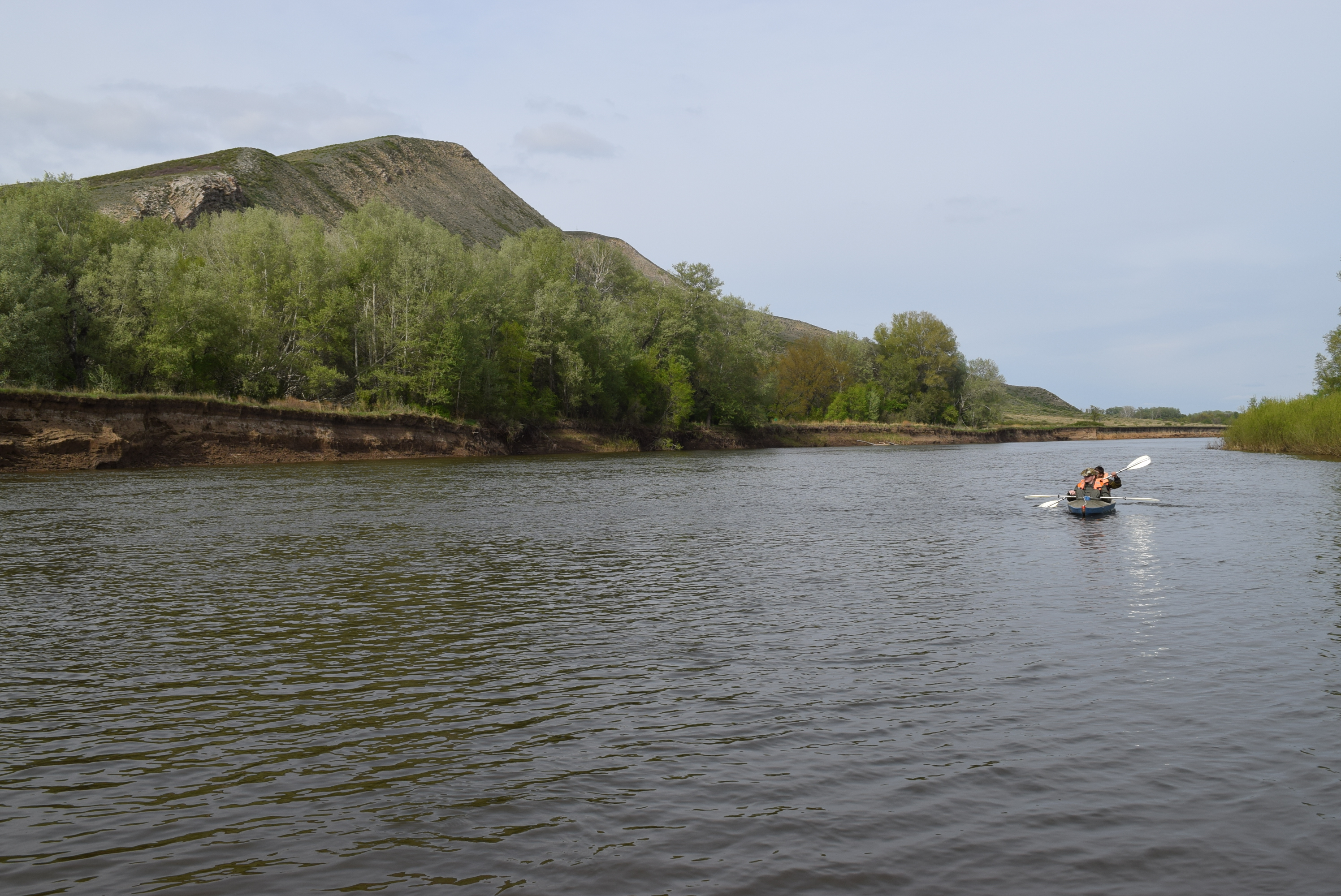
- Mountain Dyuyatash, Belyayevsky District

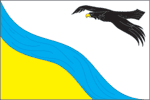
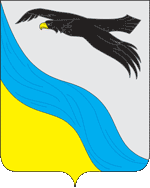
- Flag Coat of arms
- Location of Belyayevsky District in Orenburg Oblast
- Coordinates: 51°24′37″N 55°27′32″E
- Country: Russia
- Federal subject: Orenburg Oblast
- Administrative center: Belyayevka

Area
  - Total: 3,687 km^{2} (1,424 sq mi)

Population (2010 Census)
  - Total: 17,074
  - Density: 4.631/km^{2} (11.99/sq mi)
  - Urban: 0%
  - Rural: 100%

Administrative structure
  - Administrative divisions: 11 selsoviet
  - Inhabited localities: 32 rural localities

Municipal structure
  - Municipally incorporated as: Belyayevsky Municipal District
  - Municipal divisions: 0 urban settlements, 11 rural settlements
- Time zone: UTC+5 (MSK+2)
- OKTMO ID: 53610000
- Website: http://mo-be.orb.ru/

Belyayevsky District (Russian: Беля́евский райо́н; Kazakh: Бөрте ауданы, Börte audany) is an administrative and municipal district (raion), one of the thirty-five in Orenburg Oblast, Russia. It is located in the center of the oblast. The area of the district is 3,687 square kilometers (1,424 sq mi). Its administrative center is the rural locality (a selo) of Belyayevka. Population: 17,074 (2010 Census); 20,108 (2002 census); 19,877 (1989 Soviet census). The population of Belyayevka accounts for 29.2% of the total district's population.
