= Dobrinka, Surovikinsky District, Volgograd Oblast =

Dobrinka Добринка
- Khutor
- Location within Volgograd Oblast Location within Russia
- Coordinates: 48°49′N 42°58′E
- Country: Russia
- Region: Volgograd Oblast
- District: Surovikinsky District
- Time zone: UTC+4:00

Dobrinka (Russian: Добринка) is a rural locality (a khutor) and the administrative center of Dobrisnkoye Rural Settlement, Surovikinsky District, Volgograd Oblast, Russia. The population was 754 as of 2010. There are 8 streets.

== Geography ==
Dobrinka is located on the bank of the Levaya Dobraya River, 40 km northeast of Surovikino (the district's administrative centre) by road. Lobakin is the nearest rural locality.
