= Belyayevka, Belyayevsky District, Orenburg Oblast =

Rural locality in Orenburg Oblast, Russia

Coordinates: 51°23′53″N 56°24′35″E

Belyayevka (Russian: Беляевка) is a rural locality (a selo) and the administrative center of Belyayevsky District, Orenburg Oblast, Russia. Population: 4,989 (2010 census); 5,138 (2002 census); 5,050 (1989 Soviet census).
