= Dobrinka, Uryupinsky District, Volgograd Oblast =

Dobrinka Добринка
- Stanitsa
- Location within Volgograd Oblast Location within Russia
- Coordinates: 50°49′N 41°50′E
- Country: Russia
- Region: Volgograd Oblast
- District: Uryupinsky District
- Time zone: UTC+4:00

Dobrinka (Russian: Добринка) is a rural locality (a stanitsa) and the administrative center of Dobrinskoye Rural Settlement, Uryupinsky District, Volgograd Oblast, Russia. The population was 1,883 as of 2010. There are 19 streets.

== Geography ==
Dobrinka is located in forest steppe, 19 km southeast of Uryupinsk (the district's administrative centre) by road. Gorsko-Popovsky is the nearest rural locality.
