= Kommunar, Republic of Bashkortostan =

Kommunar Коммунар
- Village
- Location within Bashkortostan Location within Russia
- Coordinates: 54°41′N 56°39′E
- Country: Russia
- Region: Bashkortostan
- District: Iglinsky District
- Time zone: UTC+5:00

Kommunar (Russian: Коммунар) is a rural locality (a village) in Kaltovsky Selsoviet, Iglinsky District, Bashkortostan, Russia. The population was 19 as of 2010. There are 2 streets.

== Geography ==
Kommunar is located 35 km southeast of Iglino (the district's administrative centre) by road. Voroshilovskoye is the nearest rural locality.
