= Volga-Ural Petroleum and Gas Province =

Geographical region in Russia

The Volga-Ural Petroleum and Gas Province, also known as the Volga-Ural Petroleum and Gas Basin, is a geographical region in southern Russia. Stretching from the west bank of the Volga to the western Ural Mountains, the province contains sizeable quantities of oil and natural gas.

In parts the Volga-Ural Petroleum and Gas Province coincides with the Middle-Urals Ring Structure.

== Description ==
The province is a large geographical region in Russia. The province is found in roughly the same area as another geographic feature, the Volga-Uralic region, a broad anticline formed between western bank of the Volga river and the western slopes of the Ural Mountains. The region is further divided into three sub-regions; the Perm-Bashkir arch forms the northern border of the region, the Zhigulevsko-Orenburg arch forms the southern border, with the Tartar arch separating the two. Between all of the major arches are a series of depressions (downwarps) in the earth. In addition, the region's mineral makeup has allowed for a series of seven large aquifers to form - the largest concertation of water is found in the eastern part of the province where the underwater channels meet the western slopes of the Ural Mountains. The region's primary drainage basin is near the north coast of the Caspian Sea.

The Volga-Ural province is formed by a variety of different geological layers. The bottom of the province is made up of crystalline earth formed during the Archean Eon (4.0 to 2.5 Gya). On top of this layer are younger layers consisting of various materials, including sandstone, shale, organic forms of carbonate, and other conglomerated mineral beds. Many of the upper layers of the region are composed of marine-based materials formed by the extinction of the ancient Ural Ocean and Permian Sea. Notably, the varied remnants of seas from the Jurassic and Triassic periods - found in other parts of Russia - are not widely present in the region.

The geological history and mineral makeup of the province made it conducive to the formation of oil and natural gas, and the region currently contains large quantities of these fossil fuels. These reserves make the economic exploitation of the region viable; according to one source, as of 1983 there were around 600 oil and gas fields in the region with another 2000 smaller pools. The province saw limited interest until the 1940s, when the outbreak of World War II saw a larger amount of investment in the region. Economic investment in the province's extraction industries greatly increased in the 1950s, were reduced in the 1980s, and continue into the present day. Notable oil fields in the region include Romashkino Oil Field. The cities of Syzran, Perm, Ufa, Kuybyshev, and Orenburg all lay within the borders of the province. A series of pipelines transport oil extracted from the region to various destinations in Russia.

== See also ==
- Petroleum industry in Russia
