= Leninsk, Volgograd Oblast =

Town in Volgograd Oblast, Russia

Leninsk Ленинск
- Town
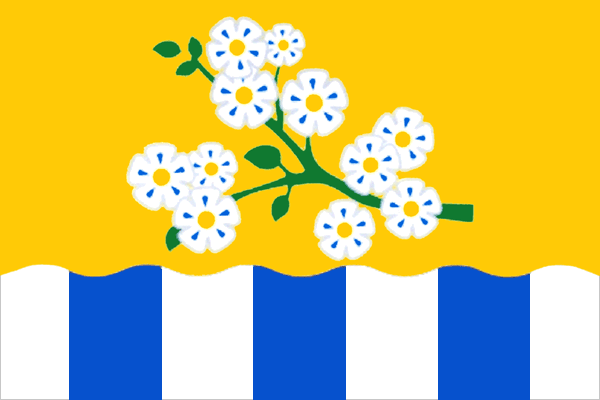
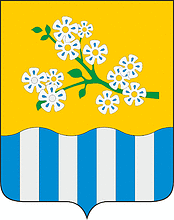
- Flag Coat of arms
- Interactive map of Leninsk
- Location of Leninsk Leninsk (Volgograd Oblast)
- Coordinates: 48°42′N 45°13′E
- Country: Russia
- Federal subject: Volgograd Oblast
- Administrative district: Leninsky District
- Town of district significanceSelsoviet: Leninsk
- Founded: 1802
- Town status since: 1963
- Elevation: 0 m (0 ft)

Population (2010 Census)
  - Total: 15,504
  - Estimate (2021): 13,391 (−13.6%)

Administrative status
  - Capital of: Leninsky District, town of district significance of Leninsk

Municipal status
  - Municipal district: Leninsky Municipal District
  - Urban settlement: Leninsk Urban Settlement
  - Capital of: Leninsky Municipal District, Leninsk Urban Settlement
- Time zone: UTC+3 (MSK)
- Postal code: 404620
- OKTMO ID: 18630101001
- Website: www.leninsk34.ru

Leninsk (Russian: Ле́нинск) is a town and the administrative center of Leninsky District in Volgograd Oblast, Russia, located on the left bank of the Akhtuba River, 78 kilometers (48 mi) east of Volgograd, the administrative center of the oblast. Population: 15,504 (2010 census); 14,866 (2002 census); 13,110 (1989 Soviet census). The town was named after Vladimir Lenin.

== History ==
It was founded in 1802 as the village of Prishibinskoye (Пришибинское) and was later renamed Prishib (Пришиб). It was renamed Leninsk in 1919 and granted town status in 1963.

== Administrative and municipal status ==
Within the framework of administrative divisions, Leninsk serves as the administrative center of Leninsky District. As an administrative division, it is incorporated within Leninsky District as the town of district significance of Leninsk. As a municipal division, the town of district significance of Leninsk is incorporated within Leninsky Municipal District as Leninsk Urban Settlement.
