= Volgograd Reservoir =

Reservoir on the Volga river in Russia

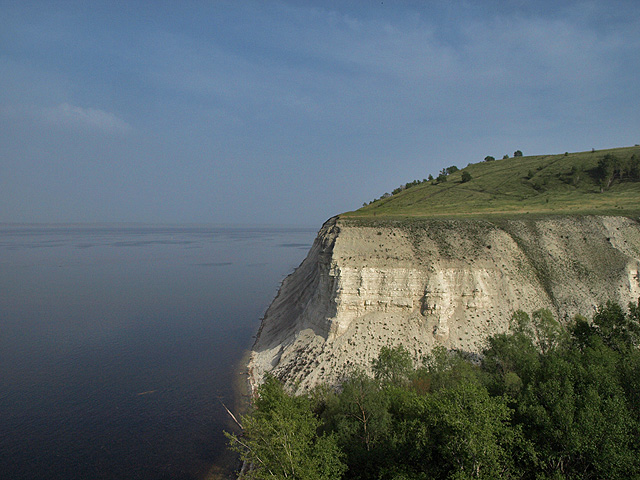
- Stefan Razin Cliff

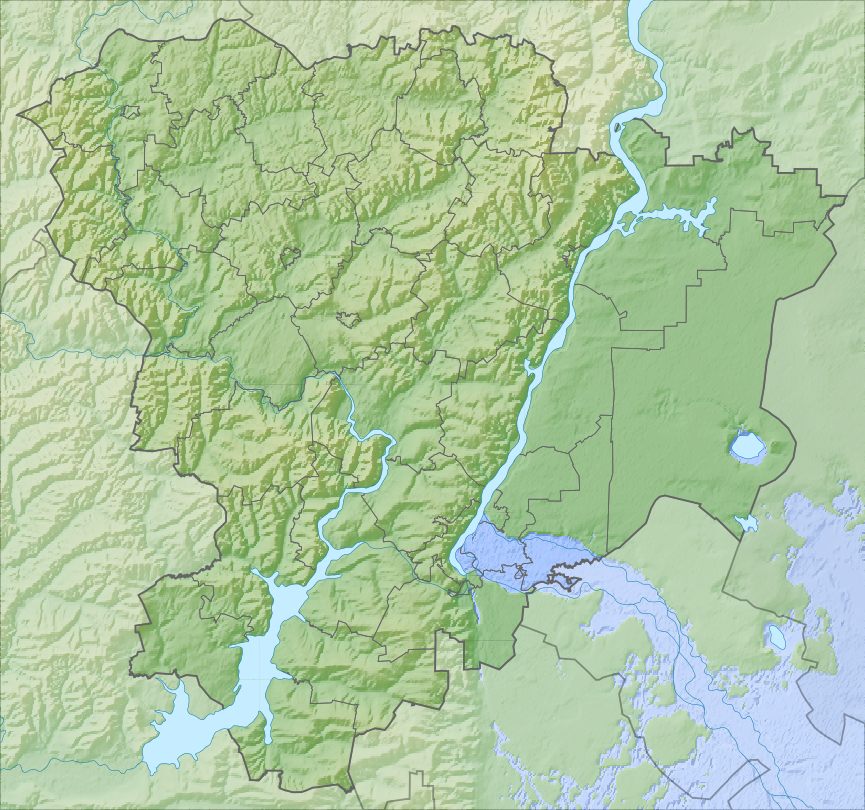
- Location within Volgograd Oblast Location within European Russia
- Coordinates: 49.13°N 44.94°E
- Type: reservoir
- Primary inflows: Volga River
- Primary outflows: Volga River
- Basin countries: Russia
- Max. length: 540 km (340 mi)
- Max. width: 17 km (11 mi)
- Surface area: 3,117 km^{2} (1,203 sq mi)
- Water volume: 31.5 km^{3} (25,500,000 acre⋅ft)
- Settlements: Kamyshin

The Volgograd Reservoir (Russian: Волгоградское водохранилище) is a reservoir on the Volga river in the Russian oblasts of Volgograd and Saratov. The reservoir's water level is maintained by the dam of the Volga Hydroelectric Station, built from 1958 to 1961.

Named after the city of Volgograd, the reservoir has an area of 3,117 km^{2}, volume of 31,5 km^{3}, length of 540 km, maximum width of 17 km, and average depth of 10.1 m. It is the third largest reservoir on the Volga in Russia, after the Kuybyshev and Rybinsk reservoirs.
