= Transvolga =

Region east of the Volga river

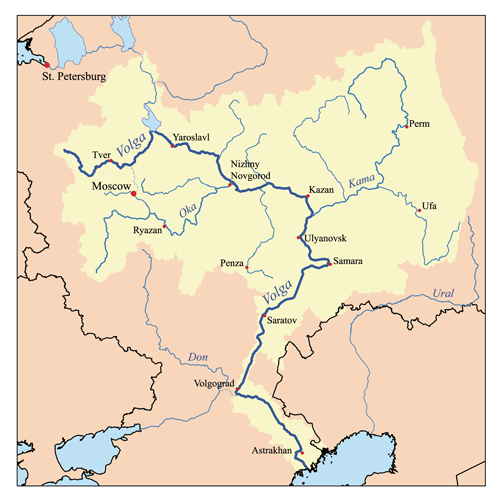
Volga drainage basin

Transvolga Region or Transvolga (Russian: Заволжье, Zavolzhye) is a territory to the East of Volga River bounded by the Volga, the Ural Mountains, the Northern Ridge, and the Caspian Depression.

The region is traditionally subdivided into the elevated High Transvolga (Высокое Заволжье) in the East and the lowland Low Transvolga (Низкое Заволжье) by the left bank of Volga between Kazan and Kamyshin.

The region includes the Volga-Ural petroleum and gas province.

Kuybyshev Reservoir is within Low Transvolga.

== See also ==
- Volga Region
- Volga-Ural interfluve
