= Leninsky District, Volgograd Oblast =

Leninsky District Ленинский район (Russian)
- District
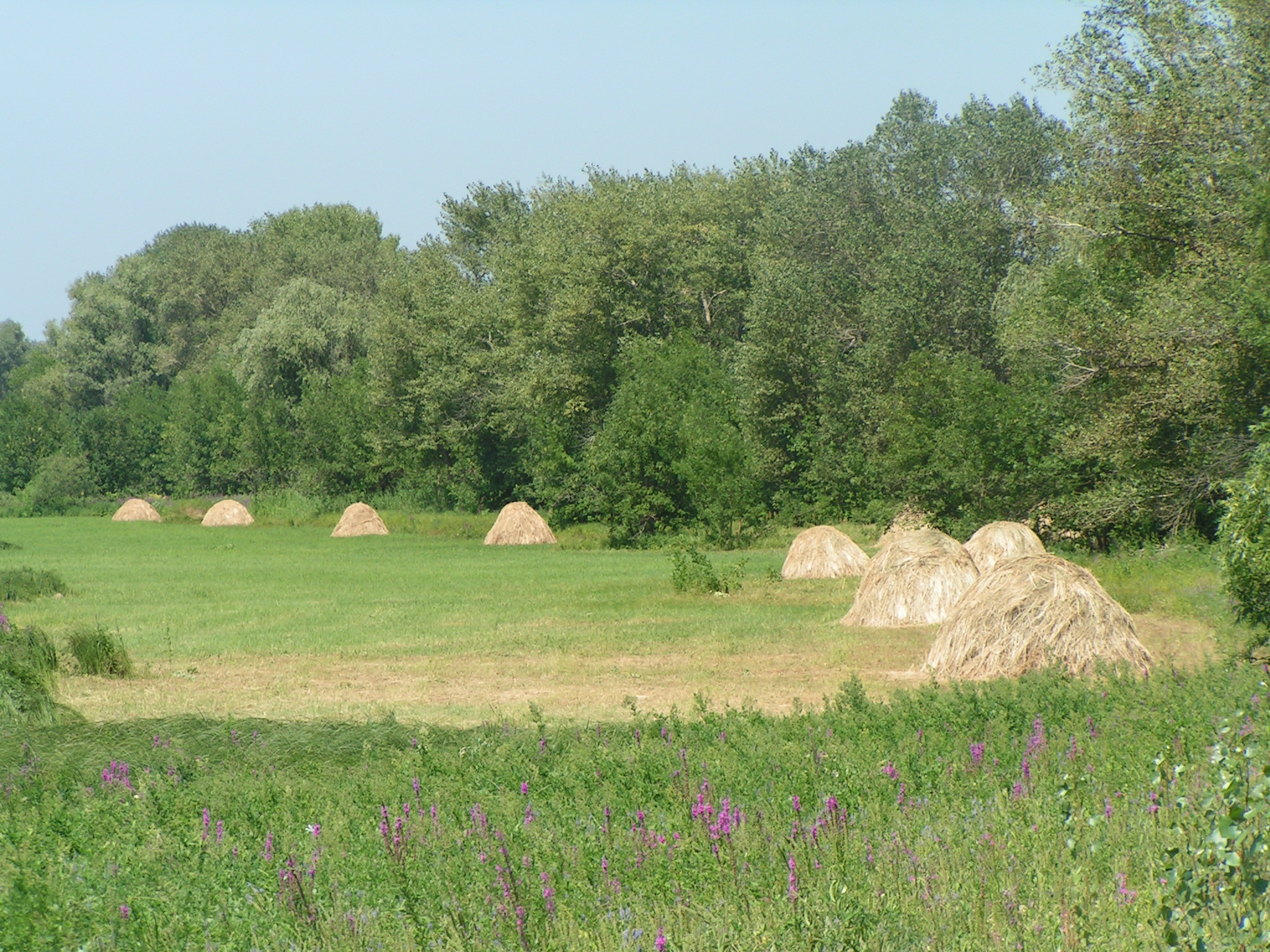
- Hay meadow in Leninsky District

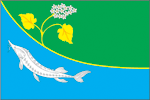
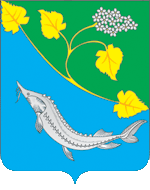
- Flag Coat of arms
- Location of Leninsky District in Volgograd Oblast
- Coordinates: 48°43′25″N 45°12′46″E
- Country: Russia
- Federal subject: Volgograd Oblast
- Established: 23 June 1928
- Administrative center: Leninsk

Area
  - Total: 2,600 km^{2} (1,000 sq mi)

Population (2010 Census)
  - Total: 30,375
  - Density: 12/km^{2} (30/sq mi)
  - Urban: 51.0%
  - Rural: 49.0%

Administrative structure
  - Administrative divisions: 1 Towns of district significance, 12 Selsoviets
  - Inhabited localities: 1 cities/towns, 30 rural localities

Municipal structure
  - Municipally incorporated as: Leninsky Municipal District
  - Municipal divisions: 1 urban settlements, 12 rural settlements
- Time zone: UTC+3 (MSK)
- OKTMO ID: 18630000
- Website: http://adm-leninskiy.ru/

Leninsky District (Russian: Ле́нинский райо́н) is an administrative district (raion), one of the thirty-three districts in Volgograd Oblast, Russia. As a municipal division, it is incorporated as the Leninsky Municipal District. It is located in the east of the oblast. The area of the district is 2,600 square kilometers (1,000 sq mi). Its administrative center is the town of Leninsk. Population: 30,375 (2010 census); 31,483 (2002 Census); 30,778 (1989 Soviet census). The population of Leninsk accounts for 51.0% of the district's total population.
