= Nikolayevsk =

Town in Volgograd Oblast, Russia

Nikolayevsk Николаевск
- Town
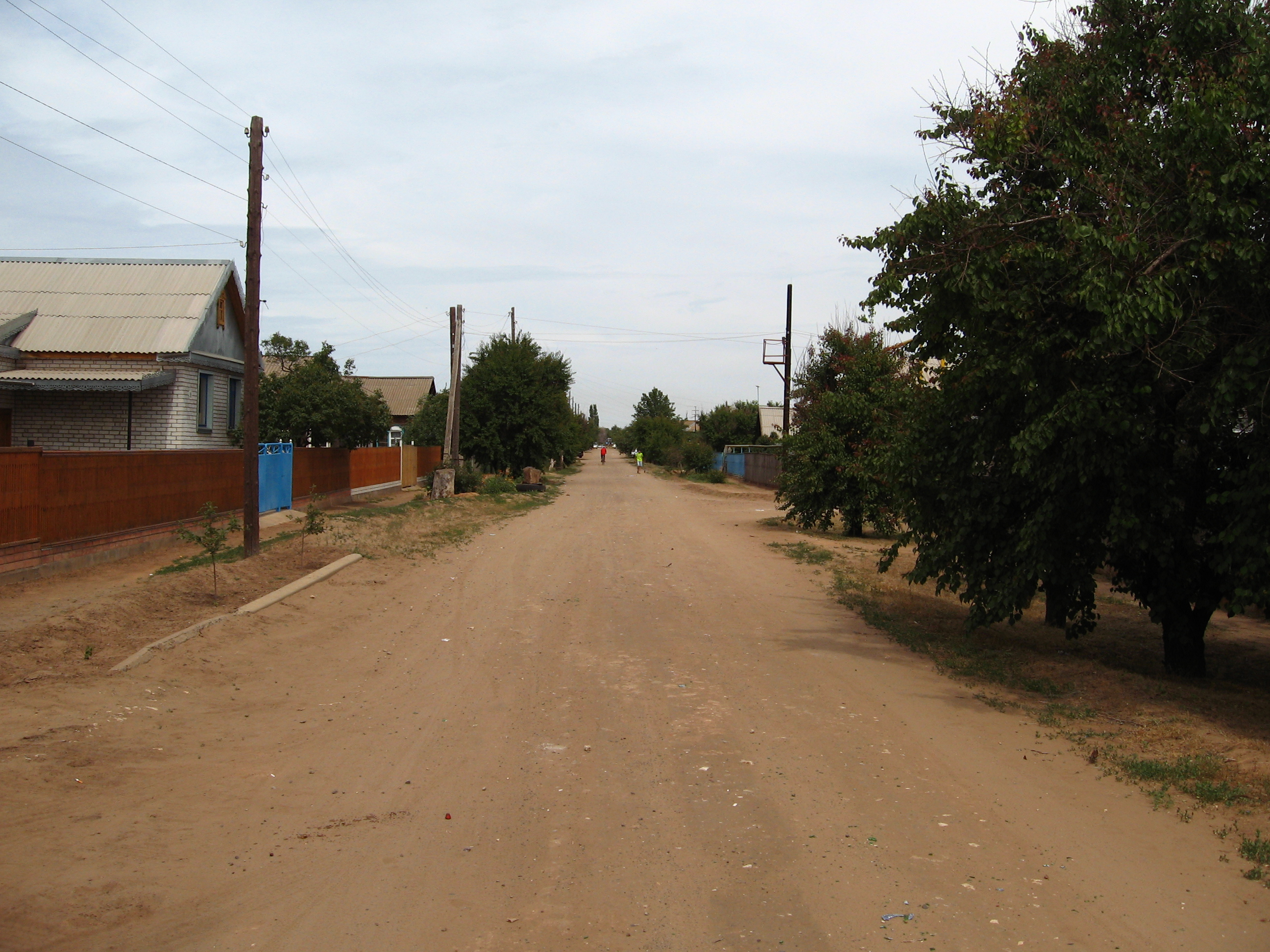
- Interactive map of Nikolayevsk
- Location of Nikolayevsk Nikolayevsk (Volgograd Oblast)
- Coordinates: 50°02′N 45°27′E
- Country: Russia
- Federal subject: Volgograd Oblast
- Administrative district: Nikolayevsky District
- Town of district significanceSelsoviet: Nikolayevsk
- Founded: 1747
- Town status since: 1967

Population (2010 Census)
  - Total: 15,075
  - Estimate (2021): 13,460 (−10.7%)

Administrative status
  - Capital of: Nikolayevsky District, town of district significance of Nikolayevsk

Municipal status
  - Municipal district: Nikolayevsky Municipal District
  - Urban settlement: Nikolayevsk Urban Settlement
  - Capital of: Nikolayevsky Municipal District, Nikolayevsk Urban Settlement
- Time zone: UTC+3 (MSK)
- Postal code: 404030–404033
- OKTMO ID: 18636101001

Nikolayevsk (Russian: Никола́евск) is a town and the administrative center of Nikolayevsky District in Volgograd Oblast, Russia, located on the left (eastern) shore of the Volga River. Population: 15,075 (2010 census); 16,125 (2002 census); 16,469 (1989 Soviet census).

== History ==
It was founded in 1747 as the khutor of Dmitriyev (Дмитриев), which was reorganized into a sloboda in 1794 and renamed Nikolayevskaya sloboda (Николаевская слобода). It was granted town status and renamed Nikolayevsk in 1967.

== Administrative and municipal status ==
Within the framework of administrative divisions, Nikolayevsk serves as the administrative center of Nikolayevsky District. As an administrative division, it is incorporated within Nikolayevsky District as the town of district significance of Nikolayevsk. As a municipal division, the town of district significance of Nikolayevsk is incorporated within Nikolayevsky Municipal District as Nikolayevsk Urban Settlement.
