= Nikolayevsky District, Volgograd Oblast =

Nikolayevsky District Николаевский район (Russian)
- District
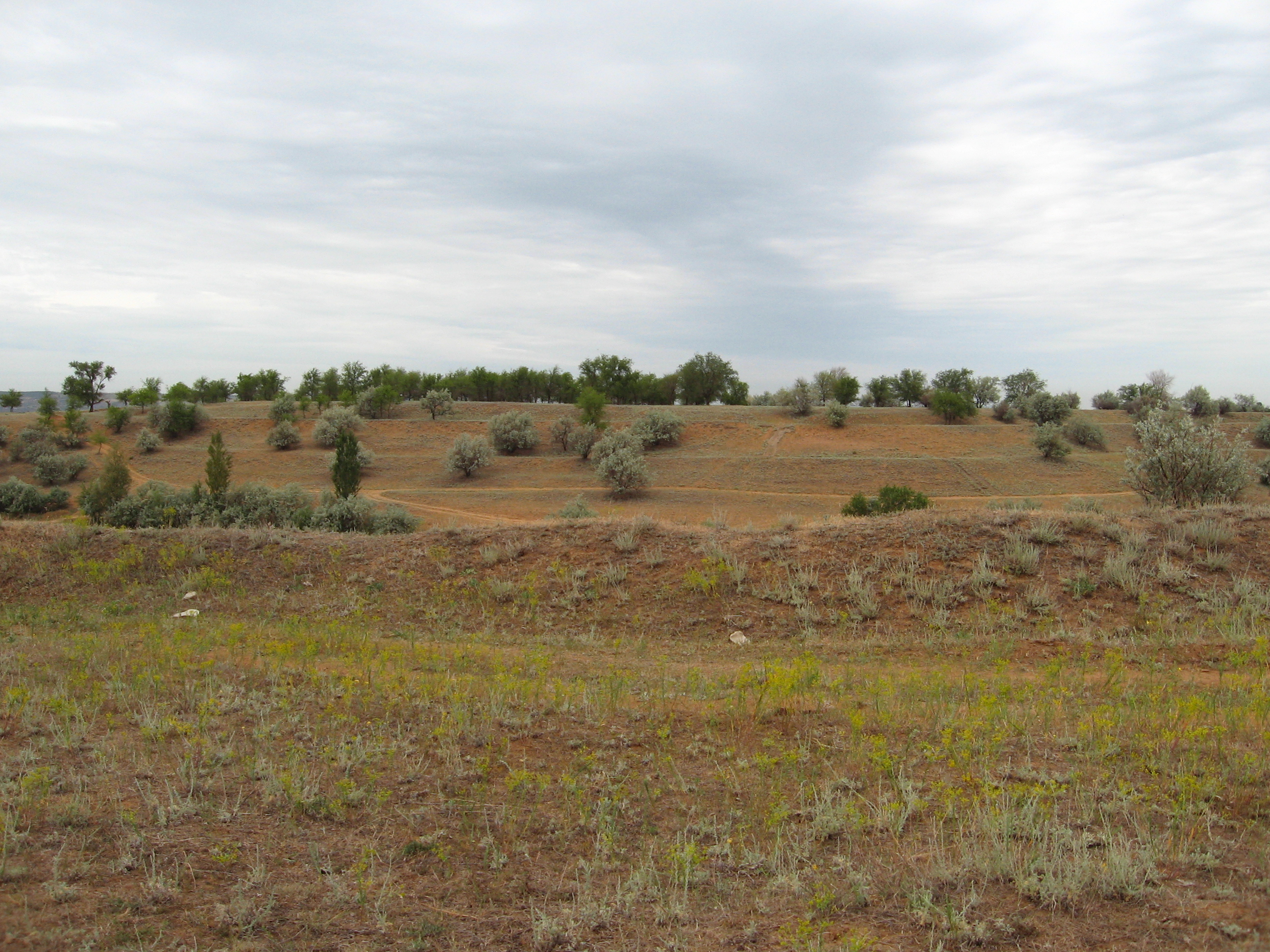
- Landscape in Nikolayevsky District

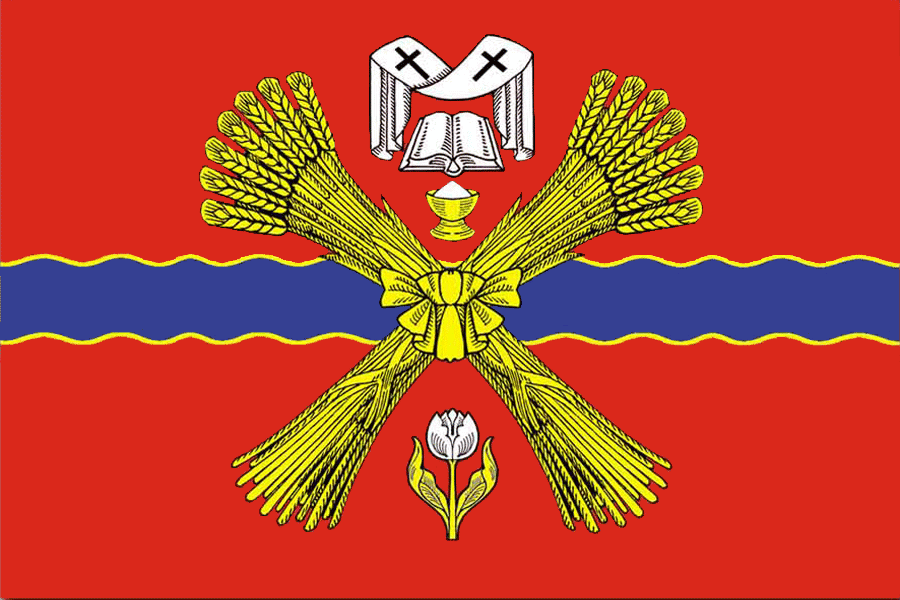
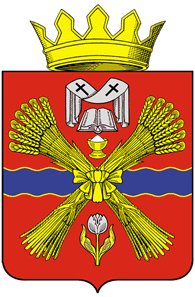
- Flag Coat of arms
- Location of Nikolayevsky District in Volgograd Oblast
- Coordinates: 50°01′N 45°27′E
- Country: Russia
- Federal subject: Volgograd Oblast
- Established: 23 June 1928
- Administrative center: Nikolayevsk

Area
  - Total: 3,440 km^{2} (1,330 sq mi)

Population (2010 Census)
  - Total: 32,034
  - Density: 9.31/km^{2} (24.1/sq mi)
  - Urban: 47.1%
  - Rural: 52.9%

Administrative structure
  - Administrative divisions: 1 Towns of district significance, 12 Selsoviets
  - Inhabited localities: 1 cities/towns, 32 rural localities

Municipal structure
  - Municipally incorporated as: Nikolayevsky Municipal District
  - Municipal divisions: 1 urban settlements, 11 rural settlements
- Time zone: UTC+3 (MSK)
- OKTMO ID: 18636000
- Website: http://www.nikadm.ru/

Nikolayevsky District (Russian: Никола́евский райо́н) is an administrative district (raion), one of the thirty-three in Volgograd Oblast, Russia. As a municipal division, it is incorporated as Nikolayevsky Municipal District. It is located in the northeast of the oblast. The area of the district is 3,440 square kilometers (1,330 sq mi). Its administrative center is the town of Nikolayevsk. Population: 32,034 (2010 census); 34,285 (2002 Census); 35,145 (1989 Soviet census). The population of Nikolayevsk accounts for 47.1% of the district's total population.
