= Staraya Poltavka =

Russian village in Volgograd Oblast

- Interactive map of Staraya Poltavka
- Location of Staraya Poltavka
- Coordinates: 50°28′43″N 46°28′56″E
- Country: Russia
- Federal subject: Volgograd Oblast
- Founded: 1830

Population
  - Estimate (2021): 4,042 )
- Time zone: UTC+3 (MSK)
- Postal code: 404211
- OKTMO ID: 18652453101

Staraya Poltavka (Russian: Старая Полтавка) is a rural locality (a selo) and the administrative center of Staropoltavsky District of Volgograd Oblast, Russia, located on the Yeruslan River.

It was founded in the first half of the 19th century by immigrants from Ukraine.

The nearest railway station is at Gmelinskaya, on the Volgograd–Saratov line.
