= Staropoltavsky District =

Staropoltavsky District Старополтавский район (Russian)
- District
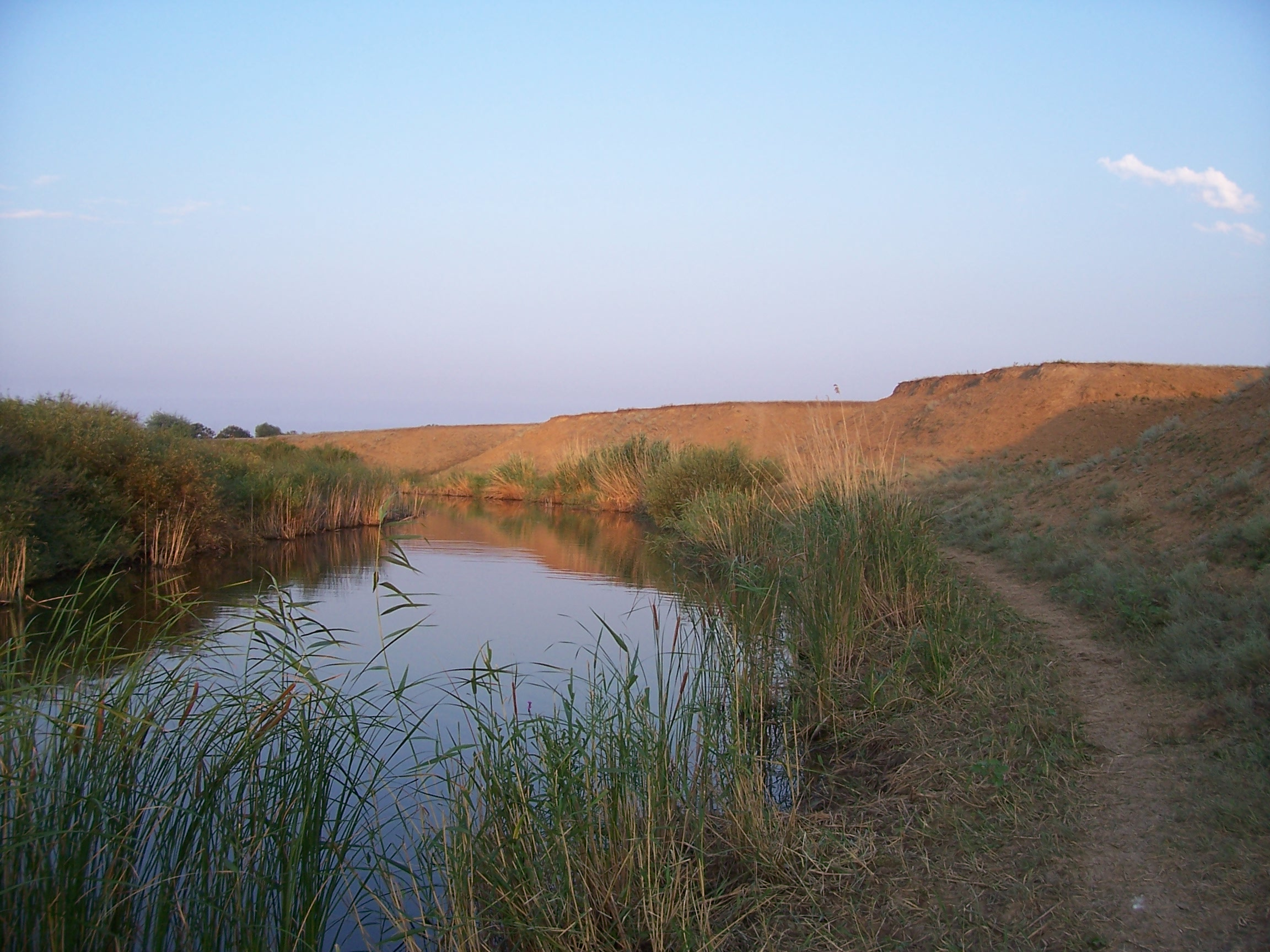

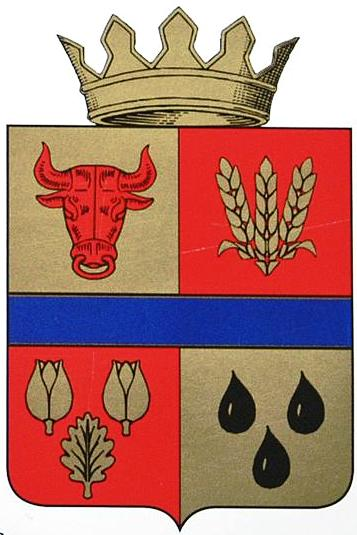
- Flag Coat of arms
- Location of Staropoltavsky District in Volgograd Oblast
- Coordinates: 50°28′N 46°28′E
- Country: Russia
- Federal subject: Volgograd Oblast
- Established: 7 September 1941
- Administrative center: Staraya Poltavka

Area
  - Total: 4,120 km^{2} (1,590 sq mi)

Population (2010 Census)
  - Total: 20,363
  - Density: 4.94/km^{2} (12.8/sq mi)
  - Urban: 0%
  - Rural: 100%

Administrative structure
  - Administrative divisions: 18 selsoviet
  - Inhabited localities: 40 rural localities

Municipal structure
  - Municipally incorporated as: Staropoltavsky Municipal District
  - Municipal divisions: 0 urban settlements, 18 rural settlements
- Time zone: UTC+3 (MSK)
- OKTMO ID: 18652000
- Website: http://stpadmin.ru/

Staropoltavsky District (Russian: Старополта́вский райо́н) is an administrative district (raion), one of the thirty-three in Volgograd Oblast, Russia. Municipally, it is incorporated as Staropoltavsky Municipal District. It is located in the northeast of the oblast. The area of the district is 4,120 square kilometers (1,590 sq mi). Its administrative center is the rural locality (a selo) of Staraya Poltavka. Population: 20,363 (2010 Census); 23,633 (2002 Census); 25,691 (1989 Soviet census). The population of Staraya Poltavka accounts for 20.1% of the district's total population.
