= List of military divisions by number =

This is a list of military divisions of all nationalities organised by number. Divisions may be infantry, airborne, cavalry, mechanized, armoured or aviation.

== 1st to 5th ==
1st Division

- Australian 1st Division
- Australian 1st Armoured Division
- Brazilian 1st Division
- British 1st Cavalry Division
- British 1st Mounted Division
- British 1st Armoured Division
- British 1st Airborne Division
- British 1st Commonwealth Division
- British 1st Division
- 1st Canadian Division
- Chinese 1st Fighter Division
- 1st Royal Bavarian Division
- 1st Bavarian Landwehr Division
- 1st Bavarian Reserve Division
- Imperial German 1st Cavalry Division
- Imperial German 1st Division
- Imperial German 1st Guards Division
- Imperial German 1st Guards Reserve Division
- Imperial German 1st Landwehr Division
- Imperial German 1st Naval Division
- Imperial German 1st Reserve Division
- German Hermann Göring Parachute Panzer Division 1 (previously Hermann Göring Division, Hermann Göring Panzer Division)
- German 1st Infantry Division
- German 1st Luftwaffe Field Division
- German 1st Panzer Division
- German 1st Parachute Division (previously 7th Flieger (Air) Division)
- German 1st Waffen-SS Panzer Leibstandarte SS Adolf Hitler Division
- Greek 1st Infantry Division
- Indian 1st Armoured Division
- 1st (Peshawar) Division of the British Indian Army before and during the First World War
- 1st Indian Cavalry Division of the British Indian Army during the First World War
- Italian 1st Alpine Division
- Italian 1st Blackshirt Armoured Division
- 1st Blackshirt Division (23 March)
- 1st Blackshirt Division "God wills It"
- Italian 1st Cavalry Division
- Italian 1st Libyan Colonial Division
- Italian 1st Mountain Infantry Division
- Japanese 1st Division
- North Korean 1st Division
- Philippine 1st Infantry Division
- Polish 1st Legions Infantry Division
- Polish 1st Lithuanian-Belarusian Division
- Polish 1st Armoured Division
- Polish 1st Grenadiers Division
- South African 1st Infantry Division
- Spanish 1st Mechanized Infantry Division "Brunete"
- U.S. 1st Armored Division
- U.S. 1st Cavalry Division
- U.S. 1st Infantry Division
- U.S. 1st Marine Division
- 1st Infantry Division (Belgium)

2nd Division

- Australian 2nd Division
- British 2nd Cavalry Division
- British 2nd Armoured Division
- British 2nd Infantry Division
- British 2nd Mounted Division
- British 2nd (African) Division
- 2nd Canadian Division
- 2nd Royal Bavarian Division
- 2nd Bavarian Landwehr Division
- Imperial German 2nd Cavalry Division
- Imperial German 2nd Division
- Imperial German 2nd Guards Division
- Imperial German 2nd Guards Reserve Division
- Imperial German 2nd Landwehr Division
- Imperial German 2nd Naval Division
- German 2nd Luftwaffe Field Division
- German 2nd Naval Infantry Division
- German 2nd Parachute Division
- Greek 2nd Mechanized Infantry Division
- 2nd (Rawalpindi) Division of the British Indian Army before and during the First World War
- 2nd Indian Cavalry Division of the British Indian Army during the First World War
- Indian 2nd Mountain Division
- Italian 2nd Alpine Division
- 2nd Blackshirt Division (28 October)
- 2nd Blackshirt Division "Black Flames"
- Italian 2nd Cavalry Division
- Italian 2nd Libyan Division
- Italian 2nd Mountain Infantry Division
- Japanese 2nd Division
- New Zealand 2nd Division
- North Korean 2nd Division
- Philippine 2nd Infantry Division
- Polish 2nd Legions Infantry Division
- Russian 2nd Guards Tamanskaya Motor Rifle Division
- South African 2nd Infantry Division
- Soviet 2nd Rifle Division
- U.S. 2nd Air Division
- U.S. 2nd Armored Division
- U.S. 2nd Cavalry Division
- U.S. 2nd Infantry Division
- U.S. 2nd Marine Division
- 2nd Infantry Division (Belgium)

3rd Division

- Australian 3rd Division
- British 3rd Infantry Division
- British 3rd Mounted Division
- British 3rd Cavalry Division
- 3rd Canadian Division
- Chinese 3rd Fighter Division
- 3rd Royal Bavarian Division
- Imperial German 3rd Cavalry Division
- Imperial German 3rd Division
- Imperial German 3rd Guards Division
- Imperial German 3rd Landwehr Division
- Imperial German 3rd Naval Division
- Imperial German 3rd Reserve Division
- German 3rd Luftwaffe Field Division
- German Parachute Division 3
- 3rd (Lahore) Division of the British Indian Army before and during the First World War
- 3rd Lahore Divisional Area of the British Indian Army during the First World War
- 3rd Indian Infantry Division – official designation for the Chindits
- Italian 3rd Alpine Division
- 3rd Blackshirt Division (21 April)
- 3rd Blackshirt Division "Black Feathers"
- Italian 3rd Cavalry Division
- Italian 3rd Mountain Infantry Division
- Japanese 3rd Division
- North Korean 3rd Division
- Philippine 3rd Infantry Division
- Polish 3rd Legions Infantry Division
- Polish 3rd Carpathian Infantry Division
- South African 3rd Infantry Division
- U.S. 3rd Armored Division
- U.S. 3rd Infantry Division
- U.S. 3rd Marine Division
- 3rd Division (Vietnam)
- 3rd Infantry Division (Belgium)

4th Division

- Australian 4th Division
- British 4th Cavalry Division
- British 4th Infantry Division
- British 4th Mounted Division
- 4th Canadian Division (also 4th Canadian (Armoured) Division)
- Chinese 4th Fighter Division
- 4th Royal Bavarian Division
- Imperial German 4th Cavalry Division
- Imperial German 4th Division
- Imperial German 4th Ersatz Division
- Imperial German 4th Guards Division
- Imperial German 4th Landwehr Division
- German 4th Luftwaffe Field Division
- German 4th Parachute Division
- 4th (Quetta) Division of the British Indian Army before and during the First World War
- 4th Cavalry Division (India) of the British Indian Army during the First World War
- Indian 4th Infantry Division
- Italian 4th Alpine Division
- Italian 4th Blackshirt Division
- Italian 4th Mountain Infantry Division
- Japanese 4th Division
- North Korean 4th Division
- Philippine 4th Infantry Division
- Russian 4th Guards Kantemirovskaya Tank Division
- U.S. 4th Air Division
- U.S. 4th Armored Division
- U.S. 4th Infantry Division
- U.S. 4th Marine Division
- 4th Infantry Division (Belgium)

5th Division

- Australian 5th Division
- British 5th Infantry Division
- 5th Canadian Division (also 5th Canadian (Armoured) Division)
- French 5th Light Cavalry Division
- French 5th Motorized Division
- French 5th North African Infantry Division
- 5th Royal Bavarian Division
- 5th Bavarian Reserve Division
- Imperial German 5th Cavalry Division
- Imperial German 5th Division
- Imperial German 5th Ersatz Division
- Imperial German 5th Guards Division
- Imperial German 5th Landwehr Division
- Imperial German 5th Reserve Division
- German 5th Luftwaffe Field Division
- German 5th Mountain Division
- German 5th Panzer Division
- German 5th Parachute Division
- Greek 5th Infantry Division
- 5th (Mhow) Division of the British Indian Army before and during the First World War
- 5th Cavalry Division (India) of the British Indian Army during the First World War
- Indian 5th Infantry Division
- Italian 5th Alpine Division
- Italian 5th Infantry Division
- Japanese 5th Division
- North Korean 5th Division
- Philippine 5th Infantry Division
- Polish 5th Siberian Rifle Division
- Polish 5th Infantry Division
- Soviet 5th Rifle Division
- U.S. 5th Air Division
- U.S. 5th Armored Division
- U.S. 5th Infantry Division
- U.S. 5th Marine Division
- 5th Infantry Division (Vietnam People's Army)
- 5th Infantry Division (Belgium)

== 6th to 10th ==
6th Division

- Australian 6th Division
- British 6th Airborne Division
- British 6th Armoured Division
- British 6th Infantry Division (World War I and II)
- 6th Canadian Infantry Division
- Finnish 6th Division (Winter War)
- Finnish 6th Division (Continuation War)
- French 6th Light Armored Division
- 6th Royal Bavarian Division
- 6th Bavarian Landwehr Division
- 6th Bavarian Reserve Division
- Imperial German 6th Cavalry Division
- Imperial German 6th Division
- Imperial German 6th Reserve Division
- German 6th Luftwaffe Field Division
- German 6th Parachute Division
- 6th (Poona) Division of the British Indian Army before and during the First World War
- 6th Poona Divisional Area of the British Indian Army during the First World War
- Indian 6th Infantry Division
- Italian 6th Alpine Division
- Italian 6th Infantry Division
- Imperial Japanese 6th Division
- North Korean 6th Division
- Norwegian 6th Division
- Philippine 6th Infantry Division
- South African 6th Armoured Division
- U.S. 6th Armored Division
- U.S. 6th Infantry Division
- U.S. 6th Marine Division
- 6th Infantry Division (Belgium)

7th Division

- Australian 7th Division
- British 7th Armoured Division "The Desert Rats"
- British 7th Infantry Division
- Canadian 7th Infantry Division
- Imperial German 7th Cavalry Division
- Imperial German 7th Division
- Imperial German 7th Landwehr Division
- Imperial German 7th Reserve Division
- German 7th Air Division (also 7th Flieger Division)
- German 7th SS Volunteer Mountain Division
- German 7th Luftwaffe Field Division
- German 7th Parachute Division (earlier Erdmann Parachute Division)
- 7th (Meerut) Division of the British Indian Army before and during the First World War
- 7th Meerut Divisional Area of the British Indian Army during the First World War
- Indian 7th Infantry Division
- Italian 7th Infantry Division
- Japanese 7th Division
- North Korean 7th Division
- Philippine 7th Infantry Division
- U.S. 7th Air Division
- U.S. 7th Armored Division
- U.S .7th Infantry Division
- 7th Division (Vietnam)
- 7th Infantry Division (Belgium)

8th Division

- Australian 8th Division
- British 8th Infantry Division
- British 8th Armoured Division
- Canadian 8th Infantry Division
- 8th Bavarian Reserve Division
- Imperial German 8th Cavalry Division
- Imperial German 8th Division
- Imperial German 8th Ersatz Division
- Imperial German 8th Landwehr Division
- German 8th Luftwaffe Field Division
- German 8th Parachute Division
- Greek 8th Infantry Division
- 8th (Lucknow) Division of the British Indian Army before and during the First World War
- Indian 8th Infantry Division
- Imperial Japanese 8th Division
- Italian 8th Infantry Division
- North Korean 8th Division
- Philippine 8th Infantry Division
- U.S. 8th Armored Division
- U.S. 8th Infantry Division
- 8th Infantry Division (Belgium)

9th Division

- Australian 9th Division
- British 9th (Highland) Infantry Division (Second World War)
- British 9th (Scottish) Division (First World War)
- British 9th Armoured Division
- 9th Bavarian Reserve Division
- Imperial German 9th Cavalry Division
- Imperial German 9th Division
- Imperial German 9th Landwehr Division
- Imperial German 9th Reserve Division
- German 9th Luftwaffe Field Division
- German 9th Parachute Division
- 9th (Secunderabad) Division of the British Indian Army before and during the First World War
- Indian 9th Infantry Division
- Italian 9th Motorised Division
- Japanese 9th Division
- North Korean 9th Division
- Philippine 9th Infantry Division
- U.S. 9th Armored Division
- U.S. 9th Infantry Division
- 9th Division (Vietnam)
- 9th Infantry Division (Belgium)

10th Division

- Australian 10th Division
- British 10th (Irish) Division (First World War)
- British 10th Armoured Division
- French 10th Parachute Division
- 10th Bavarian Infantry Division
- Imperial German 10th Division
- Imperial German 10th Ersatz Division
- Imperial German 10th Landwehr Division
- Imperial German 10th Reserve Division
- German 10th Infantry Division
- German 10th Luftwaffe Field Division
- German 10th Parachute Division
- 10th Indian Division of the British Indian Army during the First World War
- Indian 10th Infantry Division
- Japanese 10th Division
- Italian 10th Motorised Division
- North Korean 10th Division
- Philippine 10th Infantry Division
- U.S. 10th Armored Division
- U.S. 10th Mountain Division
- 10th Guards Motor Rifle Division (Soviet Army)
- 10th Division (Vietnam People's Army)
- 10th Infantry Division (Belgium)

== 11th to 20th ==
11th Division

- Australian 11th Division
- British 11th (Northern) Division
- British 11th Armoured Division
- 11th Bavarian Infantry Division
- Imperial German 11th Division
- Imperial German 11th Landwehr Division
- Imperial German 11th Reserve Division
- German 11th Luftwaffe Field Division
- German 11th Parachute Division
- 11th Indian Division of the British Indian Army during the First World War
- Indian 11th Infantry Division
- Italian 11th Infantry Division
- Imperial Japanese 11th Division
- U.S. 11th Airborne Division
- U.S. 11th Armored Division
- U.S. 11th Infantry Division
- Yugoslav 11th Air Defense Division
- 11th Infantry Division (Belgium)

12th Division

- Australian 12th Division
- British 12th (Eastern) Division, a formation in the First World War
- British 12th (Eastern) Division, a formation in the Second World War
- 12th Bavarian Infantry Division
- Imperial German 12th Division
- Imperial German 12th Landwehr Division
- Imperial German 12th Reserve Division
- German 12th Luftwaffe Field Division
- Greek 12th Mechanized Infantry Division
- 12th Indian Division of the British Indian Army during the First World War
- Indian 12th Infantry Division
- Italian 12th Infantry Division
- Imperial Japanese 12th Division
- 12th Division (North Korea)
- U.S. 12th Armored Division
- Philippine Division (United States)
- 12th Infantry Division (Belgium)

13th Division

- British 13th (Western) Division
- Imperial German 13th Division
- Imperial German 13th Landwehr Division
- Imperial German 13th Reserve Division
- German 13th Waffen Mountain Division of the SS Handschar (1st Croatian)
- German 13th Luftwaffe Field Division
- Italian 13th Infantry Division
- Imperial Japanese 13th Division
- North Korean 13th Division
- Soviet 13th Guards Cavalry Division
- U.S. 13th Airborne Division
- U.S. 13th Armored Division
- Yugoslav 13th Air Defense Division
- 13th Infantry Division (Belgium)

14th Division

- 14th (Light) Division (British Army)
- 14th Bavarian Infantry Division
- Imperial German 14th Division
- Imperial German 14th Landwehr Division
- Imperial German 14th Reserve Division
- German 14th Luftwaffe Field Division
- 14th Indian Division of the British Indian Army during the First World War
- Indian 14th Infantry Division
- Italian 14th Infantry Division
- U.S. 14th Armored Division
- 14th Infantry Division (Belgium)

15th Division

- British 15th (Scottish) Division
- Chinese 15th Fighter Division
- 15th Bavarian Infantry Division
- Imperial German 15th Division
- Imperial German 15th Landwehr Division
- Imperial German 15th Reserve Division
- German 15th Luftwaffe Field Division
- Italian 15th Infantry Division
- 15th Division (Imperial Japanese Army)
- North Korean 15th Division
- 15th Indian Division of the British Indian Army during the First World War
- Philippine 15th Infantry Division
- Yugoslav 15th Air Defense Division
- 15th Infantry Division (Belgium)

16th Division

- 16th (Irish) Division (United Kingdom)
- 16th Bavarian Infantry Division
- Imperial German 16th Division
- Imperial German 16th Landwehr Division
- Imperial German 16th Reserve Division
- German 16th Luftwaffe Field Division
- Greek 16th Mechanized Infantry Division
- 16th Indian Division of the British Indian Army during the First World War
- Italian 16th Motorised Division
- Polish 16th Infantry Division
- 16th Rifle Division (Soviet Union)
- 16th Armored Division (United States)
- 16th Infantry Division (Belgium)

17th Division

- British 17th (Northern) Division
- Imperial German 17th Division
- Imperial German 17th Landwehr Division
- Imperial German 17th Reserve Division
- German 17th Luftwaffe Field Division
- 17th Indian Division of the British Indian Army during the First World War
- Indian 17th Infantry Division
- Italian 17th Motorised Division
- 17th Division (Imperial Japanese Army)
- 17th Airborne Division (United States)
- 17th Infantry Division (Belgium)

18th Division

- 18th (Eastern) Division (United Kingdom)
- 18th Infantry Division (United Kingdom)
- Imperial German 18th Division
- Imperial German 18th Landwehr Division
- Imperial German 18th Reserve Division
- German 18th Luftwaffe Field Division
- 18th Indian Division of the British Indian Army during the First World War
- Italian 18th Infantry Division
- 18th Division (North Korea)
- 18th Division (South Vietnam)
- 18th Cavalry Division (Soviet Union)
- 18th Infantry Division (Belgium)

19th Division

- 19th (Western) Division (British Army)
- Imperial German 19th Division
- Imperial German 19th Ersatz Division
- Imperial German 19th Landwehr Division
- Imperial German 19th Reserve Division
- German 19th Luftwaffe Field Division (later 19th Luftwaffe Storm Division)
- Indian 19th Infantry Division
- Italian 19th Infantry Division
- North Korean 19th Division
- 19th Motor Rifle Division (Soviet Union)
- 19th Infantry Division (United States)

20th Division

- British 20th (Light) Division
- Imperial German 20th Division
- Imperial German 20th Landwehr Division
- German 20th Luftwaffe Field Division (later 20th Luftwaffe Storm Division)
- German 20th Parachute Division
- Indian 20th Infantry Division
- Italian 20th Infantry Division
- U.S. 20th Armored Division

== 21st to 30th ==
21st Division

- British 21st Division
- Imperial German 21st Division
- Imperial German 21st Landwehr Division
- Imperial German 21st Reserve Division
- German 21st Luftwaffe Field Division (formerly the Meindl Division)
- German Parachute Division 21
- German Panzer Division 21
- Indian 21st Infantry Division
- Italian 21st Infantry Division
- 21st Mountain Infantry Division (Poland)

22nd Division

- British 22nd Division
- French 22nd Infantry Division
- Imperial German 22nd Division
- Imperial German 22nd Landwehr Division
- Imperial German 22nd Reserve Division
- German 22nd Panzer Division
- German 22nd Air Landing Division
- German 22nd Luftwaffe Field Division
- Italian 22nd Infantry Division
- Imperial Japanese 22nd Infantry Division
- Polish 22nd Mountain Infantry Division
- U.S. 22nd Cavalry Division

23rd Division

- British 23rd Division
- British 23rd (Northumbrian) Division
- Imperial German 23rd Division
- Imperial German 23rd Landwehr Division
- Imperial German 23rd Reserve Division
- German 23rd Infantry Division
- German 23rd Panzer Division
- German 23rd Waffen Mountain Division of the SS Kama
- Italian 23rd Infantry Division
- Imperial Japanese 23rd Infantry Division
- Indian 23rd Infantry Division
- U.S. 23rd Air Division
- U.S. 23rd Cavalry Division
- U.S. 23rd Infantry Division ("Americal Division")

24th Division

- British 24th Division
- Chinese 24th Fighter Division
- Imperial German 24th Division
- Imperial German 24th Reserve Division
- German 24th Panzer Division
- Italian 24th Infantry Division
- Imperial Japanese 24th Division
- Soviet 24th Rifle Division
- U.S. 24th Air Division
- U.S. 24th Cavalry Division
- U.S. 24th Infantry Division

25th Division

- British 25th Infantry Division
- Imperial German 25th Division
- Imperial German 25th Landwehr Division
- Imperial German 25th Reserve Division
- Imperial Japanese 25th Infantry Division
- Italian 25th Motorised Division
- Soviet 25th Rifle Division
- U.S. 25th Infantry Division

26th Division

- Imperial German 26th Division
- Imperial German 26th Landwehr Division
- Imperial German 26th Reserve Division
- German 26th Infantry Division
- Indian 26th Infantry Division
- Italian 26th Mountain Infantry Division
- U.S. 26th Air Division
- U.S. 26th Infantry Division

27th Division

- British 27th Division
- Imperial German 27th Division
- German 27th Panzer Division
- Italian 27th Motorised Division
- North Korean 27th Division
- Polish 27th Home Army Infantry Division
- U.S. 27th Infantry Division

28th Division

- British 28th Division
- Imperial German 28th Division
- Imperial German 28th Reserve Division
- Italian 28th Infantry Division
- Polish 28th Infantry Division
- U.S. 28th Infantry Division

29th Division

- British 29th Division
- Imperial German 29th Division
- German 29th Infantry Division
- German 29th Waffen Grenadier Division of the SS (1st Italian)
- Italian 29th Infantry Division
- U.S. 29th Air Division
- U.S. 29th Infantry Division

30th Division

- Imperial German 30th Division
- Imperial German 30th Reserve Division – later 30th Bavarian Reserve Division
- Italian 30th Infantry Division
- British 30th Division
- U.S. 30th Infantry Division

== 31st to 40th ==
31st Division

- British 31st Division
- Imperial German 31st Infantry Division
- Imperial Japanese 31st Infantry Division
- Italian 31st Infantry Division
- U.S. 31st Infantry Division
- 31st Division (Vietnam People's Army)

32nd Division

- British 32nd Division
- French 32nd Infantry Division
- German 32nd Infantry Division
- Imperial German 32nd Infantry Division
- Italian 32nd Infantry Division
- Soviet 32nd Rifle Division
- U.S. 32nd Air Division
- U.S. 32nd Infantry Division

33rd Division

- Imperial German 33rd Division
- Imperial German 33rd Reserve Division
- German 33rd Infantry Division
- German 33rd Waffen Grenadier Division of the SS Charlemagne (1st French)
- Indian 33rd Armoured Division
- Italian 33rd Mountain Infantry Division
- Imperial Japanese 33rd Division
- Soviet 33rd Motor Rifle Division
- British 33rd Division
- U.S. 33rd Air Division
- U.S. 33rd Infantry Division

34th Division

- British 34th Division
- Imperial German 34th Division
- U.S. 34th Infantry Division

35th Division

- Imperial German 35th Division
- Imperial German 35th Reserve Division
- German 35th SS and Police Grenadier Division
- British 35th Division
- U.S. 35th Air Division
- U.S. 35th Infantry Division

36th Division

- British 36th (Ulster) Division
- British 36th Infantry Division (World War II)
- Imperial German 36th Division
- Imperial German 36th Reserve Division
- Indian 36th Infantry Division
- Israeli 36th Armor Division
- Italian 36th Mountain Infantry Division
- U.S. 36th Infantry Division

37th Division

- Imperial German 37th Division
- Imperial Japanese 37th Division
- Italian 37th Mountain Infantry Division
- U.S. 37th Air Division
- U.S. 37th Infantry Division

38th Division

- Imperial German 38th Division
- Imperial German 38th Landwehr Division
- British 38th (Welsh) Division
- Italian 38th Infantry Division
- U.S. 38th Air Division
- U.S. 38th Infantry Division

39th Division

- British 39th Division
- Imperial German 39th Division
- Imperial German 39th Reserve Division – later 39th Bavarian Reserve Division
- Indian 39th Infantry Division
- U.S. 39th Air Division
- 39th Infantry Division (United States)

40th Division

- British 40th Infantry Division
- Imperial German 40th Division
- Imperial Japanese 40th Division
- Italian 40th Infantry Division
- U.S. 40th Air Division
- U.S. 40th Infantry Division

== 41st to 50th ==
41st Division

- British 41st Division
- French 41st Infantry Division
- Imperial German 41st Infantry Division
- Imperial Japanese 41st Division
- Italian 41st Infantry Division
- U.S. 41st Air Division
- U.S. 41st Infantry Division

42nd Division

- British 42nd (East Lancashire) Division
- British 42nd Armoured Division
- Imperial German 42nd Infantry Division
- U.S. 42nd Infantry Division

43rd Division

- British 43rd (Wessex) Infantry Division
- 43rd Reserve Division (German Empire)
- North Korean 43rd Division
- U.S. 43rd Infantry Division

44th Division

- British 44th (Home Counties) Infantry Division
- Imperial German 44th Landwehr Division
- Imperial German 44th Reserve Division
- German 44th Infantry Division
- Indian 44th Airborne Division
- Italian 44th Infantry Division
- 44th Training Airborne Division (Soviet Airborne Forces)
- U.S. 44th Infantry Division
- U.S. 44th Air Division

45th Division

- German 45th Landwehr Division
- German 45th Reserve Division
- 45th Rifle Division (Soviet Union)
- British 45th Infantry Division
- U.S. 45th Air Division
- U.S. 45th Infantry Division

46th Division

- British 46th Infantry Division
- Imperial German 46th Landwehr Division
- Imperial German 46th Reserve Division
- German 46th Infantry Division

47th Division

- British 47th (1/2nd London) Division
- Imperial Landwehr 47th Reserve Division
- Imperial German 47th Reserve Division
- Italian 47th Infantry Division
- U.S. 47th Air Division
- U.S. 47th Infantry Division

48th Division

- Imperial Landwehr 48th Reserve Division
- Imperial German 48th Reserve Division
- Italian 48th Infantry Division
- 48th Armored Division (United States Army)
- 48th Infantry Division

49th Division

- Imperial German 49th Reserve Division
- Italian 49th Infantry Division
- 49th Rifle Division (Soviet Union)
- British 49th (West Riding) Infantry Division (World War I and II)
- U.S. 49th Armored Division
- U.S. 49th Infantry Division

50th Division

- 50th (Northumbrian) Division
- 50th (Northumbrian) Infantry Division (World War II)
- Imperial German 50th Infantry Division
- Imperial German 50th Reserve Division
- Italian 50th Infantry Division
- 50th Infantry Division (United States)
- 50th Armored Division (United States)

== 51st to 60th ==
51st Division

- British 51st (Highland) Division (World War I)
- British 51st (Highland) Infantry Division (World War II)
- Imperial German 51st Reserve Division
- Italian 51st Infantry Division
- Japanese 51st Division

52nd Division

- British 52nd (Lowland) Division
- Imperial German 52nd Infantry Division
- Imperial German 52nd Reserve Division
- Italian 52nd Infantry Division "Torino"

53rd Division

- French 53rd Infantry Division
- Imperial German 53rd Reserve Division
- Italian 53rd Infantry Division "Arezzo"
- 53 Division (Sri Lanka)
- British 53rd (Welsh) Division

54th Division

- British 54th (East Anglian) Division
- Imperial German 54th Infantry Division
- Imperial German 54th Reserve Division
- Italian 54th Infantry Division

55th Division

- British 55th Division:
  - 55th (West Lancashire) Division (1908-1920)
  - 55th (West Lancashire) Infantry Division (1920-1945)
- French 55th Infantry Division
- Imperial Japanese 55th Infantry Division
- Italian 55th Infantry Division
- Polish 55th Infantry Division

56th Division

- British 56th (1/1st London) Division (World War I)
- British 56th (London) Infantry Division
- German 56th Infantry Division
- Imperial German 56th Infantry Division
- Italian 56th Infantry Division
- Imperial Japanese 56th Division
- Soviet 56th Rifle Division

57th Division

- British 57th (2nd West Lancashire) Division
- Italian 57th Infantry Division
- Imperial Japanese 57th Infantry Division
- U.S. 57th Air Division

58th Division

- Chinese 58th Division
- Imperial German 58th Infantry Division
- German 58th Infantry Division
- Italian 58th Infantry Division
- Sri Lankan 58th Division
- U.S. 58th Air Division

59th Division

- British 59th (Staffordshire) Infantry Division (World War II)
- Chinese 59th Division
- Italian 59th Mountain Infantry Division

60th Division

- British 60th (2/2nd London) Division
- Chinese 60th Division
- French 60th Infantry Division
- German 60th Infantry Division
- Italian 60th Infantry Division

== 61st to 70th ==
61st Division

- British 61st (2nd South Midland) Division - (First World War)
- British 61st Infantry Division (Second World War)
- French 61st Infantry Division (Second World War)
- German 61st Infantry Division (Second World War)
- Italian 61st Infantry Division
- Soviet 61st Tank Division (Second World War)

62nd Division

- British 62nd Infantry Division
- Italian 62nd Infantry Division
- U.S. 62nd Cavalry Division

63rd Division

- British 63rd (Royal Naval) Division
- Italian 63rd Infantry Division
- U.S. 63rd Cavalry Division
- U.S. 63rd Infantry Division

64th Division

- German 64th Infantry Division
- Italian 64th Infantry Division
- Imperial Japanese 64th Infantry Division
- Soviet 64th Rifle Division
- U.S. 64th Air Division
- U.S. 64th Cavalry Division

65th Division

- British 65th Division
- Italian 65th Infantry Division
- U.S. 65th Air Division
- U.S. 65th Cavalry Division
- U.S. 65th Infantry Division

66th Division

- 66th (2nd East Lancashire) Division (British First World War formation)
- 66th Infantry Division (British Second World War formation)
- U.S. 66th Cavalry Division
- U.S. 66th Infantry Division

67th Division

- 67th Guards Rifle Division
- 67th (2nd Home Counties) Division (United Kingdom)

68th Division

- 68th Infantry Division (France)
- 68th Infantry Division (Wehrmacht)
- 68th (2nd Welsh) Division (United Kingdom)

69th Division

- German 69th Infantry Division
- 69th (2nd East Anglian) Division (United Kingdom)
- U.S. 69th Air Division
- U.S. 69th Infantry Division

70th Division

- 70th Infantry Division (United Kingdom) (Second World War)
- 70th Infantry Division (United States)

== 71st to 80th ==
71st Division

- 71st Infantry Division (France)
- 71st Infantry Division (Germany)
- 71st Division (United Kingdom)
- 71st Infantry Division (United States)

72nd Division

- 72nd Infantry Division (France)
- 72nd Infantry Division (Germany)
- Soviet 72nd Guards Rifle Division
- 72nd Division (United Kingdom)
- 72nd Infantry Division (United States)

73rd Division

- 73rd Infantry Division (Wehrmacht)
- 73rd Rifle Division (Soviet Union)
- 73rd Guards Rifle Division
- 73rd Division (United Kingdom)

74th Division

- British 74th (Yeomanry) Division
- 74th Infantry Division (United States)

75th Division

- 75th Reserve Division (German Empire)
- 75th Infantry Division (Philippine Commonwealth)
- 75th Guards Tank Division
- 75th Guards Rifle Division
- 75th Rifle Division (Soviet Union)
- 75th Division (United Kingdom)
- 75th Infantry Division (United States)

76th Division

- British 76th Infantry Division (Second World War)
- Imperial German 76th Reserve Division
- Soviet 76th Rifle Division
- U.S. 76th Infantry Division

77th Division

- British 77th Infantry Division (Second World War)
- Imperial German 77th Reserve Division
- U.S. 77th Infantry Division

78th Division

- British 78th Infantry Division (Second World War)
- Imperial German 78th Reserve Division
- German 78th Sturm Division
- U.S. 78th Infantry Division
- 78th Rifle Division (Soviet Union)

79th Division

- British 79th Armoured Division (Second World War)
- Chinese 79th Division
- Imperial German 79th Reserve Division
- U.S. 79th Infantry Division

80th Division

- British 80th Infantry Division
- Chinese 80th Division
- Imperial German 80th Reserve Division
- Israeli 80th Division
- Italian 80th Infantry Division (Airlanding)
- Soviet 80th Rifle Division
- U.S. 80th Infantry Division

== 81st to 90th ==
81st Division

- British 81st (West Africa) Division
- Chinese 81st Division
- Imperial German 81st Reserve Division
- U.S. 81st Infantry Division
- 81st Rifle Division (Soviet Union)
- 81st Guards Motor Rifle Division (Soviet Union)

82nd Division

- British 82nd (West Africa) Division
- Imperial German 82nd Reserve Division
- U.S. 82nd Airborne Division

83rd Division

- Imperial German 83rd Infantry Division
- 83rd Infantry Division (Wehrmacht)
- Soviet 83rd Cavalry Division
- U.S. 83rd Infantry Division

84th Division

- Imperial German 84th Infantry Division
- U.S. 84th Infantry Division

85th Division

- Imperial German 85th Landwehr Division
- 85th Infantry Division (Wehrmacht)
- Soviet 85th Rifle Division
- U.S. 85th Air Division
- U.S. 85th Infantry Division

86th Division

- Imperial German 86th Infantry Division
- U.S. 86th Air Division
- U.S. 86th Infantry Division

87th Division

- Imperial German 87th Infantry Division
- 87th Infantry Division (Wehrmacht)
- Soviet 87th Rifle Division
- U.S. 87th Infantry Division

88th Division

- Chinese 88th Division
- Chinese (Nationalist) 88th Division
- Imperial German 88th Infantry Division
- 88th Infantry Division (Wehrmacht)
- U.S. 88th Infantry Division

89th Division

- Chinese 89th Division
- Imperial German 89th Infantry Division
- 89th Infantry Division (Wehrmacht)
- Soviet 89th "Tamanyan" Rifle Division
- U.S. 89th Infantry Division

90th Division

- German 90th Light Infantry Division
- Soviet 90th Guards Tank Division
- U.S. 90th Air Division
- U.S. 90th Infantry Division

== 91st to 100th ==
91st Division

- 91st Infantry Division (German Empire)
- German 91st Infantry Division
- Israeli 91st Division
- U.S. 91st Infantry Division
- U.S. 91st Air Division

92nd Division

- 92nd Infantry Division (German Empire)
- U.S. 92nd Infantry Division
- Iranian 92nd Armoured Division

93rd Division

- 93rd Infantry Division (German Empire)
- 93rd Infantry Division (Wehrmacht)
- 93rd Guards Motor Rifle Division (Soviet Union)
- U.S. 93rd Infantry Division

94th Division

- 94th Division (People's Republic of China)
- 94th Infantry Division (German Empire)
- 94th Infantry Division (Wehrmacht)
- 94th Guards Rifle Division (Soviet Union)
- U.S. 94th Infantry Division

95th Division

- 95th Infantry Division (German Empire)
- 95th Infantry Division (Wehrmacht)
- 95th Rifle Division (Soviet Union)
- U.S. 95th Infantry Division

96th Division

- 96th Infantry Division (German Empire)
- U.S. 96th Infantry Division
- U.S. 96th Air Division

97th Division

- 97th Jäger Division (Wehrmacht)
- 97th Guards Rifle Division (Soviet Union)
- U.S. 97th Infantry Division

98th Division

- 98th Infantry Division (Germany)
- Israeli 98th Paratroopers Division
- 98th Guards Airborne Division
- U.S. 98th Infantry Division

99th Division

- German 99th Light Infantry Division
- Soviet 99th Rifle Division
- U.S. 99th Infantry Division

100th Division

- Soviet 100th Guards Rifle Division
- U.S. 100th Infantry Division
- German 100th Light Infantry Division

== 101st to 110th ==
101st Division

- French 101st Infantry Division
- Imperial German 101st Infantry Division
- German 101st Jäger Division
- Italian 101st Motorised Division
- U.S. 101st Airborne Division
- 101st Rifle Division (Soviet Union)

102nd Division

- French 102nd Fortress Division
- German 102nd Infantry Division
- Italian 102nd Motorised Division
- Japanese 102nd Division
- U.S. 102nd Infantry Division

103rd Division

- 103rd Infantry Division (German Empire)
- Italian 103rd Motorised Division
- U.S. 103rd Infantry Division

104th Division

- German 104th Jäger Division
- Italian 104th Motorized Division
- U.S. 104th Infantry Division

105th Division

- Imperial German 105th Infantry Division
- Italian 105th Motorised Division
- North Korean 105th Armored Division

106th Division

- Imperial Japanese 106th Infantry Division
- 106th Guards Airborne Division (Russia)
- U.S. 106th Infantry Division

107th Division

- Imperial German 107th Infantry Division
- Soviet 107th Tank Division

108th Division

- Imperial German 108th Infantry Division
- 108th Division (United States) (Institutional Training)

109th Division

- 109th Infantry Division (France)
- Imperial German 109th Infantry Division
- Japanese 109th Division
- 109th Rifle Division (Soviet Union)

110th Division

- German 110th Infantry Division
- 110th Rifle Division (Red Army)

== 111th to 120th ==
111th Division

- Imperial German 111th Infantry Division
- 111th Infantry Division (Wehrmacht)
- 111th Tank Division (Red Army, World War II)

112th Division

- Chinese 112th Division
- 112th Infantry Division (Wehrmacht)
- 112th Guards Rifle Division (Soviet Union, post World War II)
- 112th Tank Division (Red Army, World War II)

113th Division

- 113th Division (People's Republic of China)
- 113th Infantry Division (German Empire)
- 113th Infantry Division (Wehrmacht)

114th Division

- Chinese 114th Division
- German 114th Jäger Division
- Imperial Japanese 114th Division

115th Division

- 115th Division (People's Republic of China)
- 115th Infantry Division (German Empire)
- 115th Guards Motor Rifle Division (Soviet Union, post World War II)

116th Division

- 116th Division (People's Republic of China)
- 116th Panzer Division (Wehrmacht)

117th Division

- 117th Division (People's Republic of China)
- 117th Infantry Division (German Empire)
- 117th Rifle Division (Soviet Union)

118th Division

- 118th Division (People's Republic of China)
- 118th Jäger Division (Wehrmacht)
- 118th Guards Rifle Division (Soviet Union)

119th Division

- 119th Division (People's Republic of China).
- 119th Infantry Division (German Empire).

120th Division

- 120th Division (People's Republic of China)
- 120th Guards Rifle Division (Soviet Union)

== 121st to 130th ==
121st Division

- Imperial German 121st Infantry Division
- German 121st Infantry Division

122nd Division

- German 122nd Infantry Division
- 122nd Guards Rifle Division (Soviet Union)

123rd Division

- Imperial German 123rd Infantry Division

124th Division

- Chinese 124th Infantry Division
- 124th Guards Rifle Division (Soviet Union)

125th Division

- Chinese 125th Infantry Division
- German 125th Infantry Division

126th Division

- Chinese 126th Infantry Division
- German 126th Infantry Division

127th Division

- Chinese 127th Infantry Division
- 127th Motor Rifle Division (Russia)
- 127th Machine Gun Artillery Division (Soviet Union)
- 127th Motor Rifle Division (Soviet Union)

128th Division

- 128th Guards Rifle Division

129th Division

- German 129th Infantry Division

130th Division

- German 130th Panzer-Lehr-Division

== 131st to 140th ==
131st Division

- 131st Infantry Division (Wehrmacht)
- Italian 131st Armoured Division
- 131st Infantry Division (Philippines)
- 131st Motor Rifle Division (Soviet Union)

132nd Division

- Italian 132nd Armoured Division

133rd Division

- Italian 133rd Division
- 133rd Rifle Division (Soviet Union)

134th Division

- 134th Infantry Division (Wehrmacht)
- Italian 134th Armoured Division

135th Division

- Italian 135th Armoured Cavalry Division

136th Division

- Italian 136th Armoured Division
- Italian 136th Infantry Division
- 136th Rifle Division (Soviet Union)

137th Division

- 137th Infantry Division (Wehrmacht)

138th Division

- 138th Rifle Division (Soviet Union)

139th Division

- 139th Rifle Division (Soviet Union)

140th Division

- 140th Division (Imperial Japanese Army)
- 140th Rifle Division (Soviet Union)

== 141st to 150th ==
141st Division

- German 141st Reserve Division

142nd Division

- 142nd Division (Imperial Japanese Army)

143rd Division

- 143rd Division (Imperial Japanese Army)

144th Division

- 144th Division (Imperial Japanese Army)

145th Division

- 145th Division (Imperial Japanese Army)

146th Division

- 146th Division (Imperial Japanese Army)

147th Division

- 147th Division (Imperial Japanese Army)

148th Division

- 148th Division (People's Republic of China)
- 148th Division (Imperial Japanese Army)
- 148th Reserve Division (Wehrmacht)

149th Division

- 149th Division (People's Republic of China)
- Israeli 149th Division
- 149th Division (Imperial Japanese Army)

150th Division

- 150th Division (1st Formation) (People's Republic of China)
- 150th Division (2nd Formation) (People's Republic of China)
- 150th Division (3rd Formation) (People's Republic of China)
- 150th Division (Imperial Japanese Army)
- 150th Rifle Division (Soviet Union)

== 151st to 160th ==
151st Division

- 151st Division (Imperial Japanese Army)
- Italian 151st Garrison Division

152nd Division

- 152nd Division (Imperial Japanese Army)
- Italian 152nd Garrison Division

153rd Division

- 153rd Division (Imperial Japanese Army)
- Italian 153rd Garrison Division
- 153rd Rifle Division (Soviet Union)

154th Division

- 154th Division (Imperial Japanese Army)
- Italian 154th Garrison Division

155th Division

- 155th Infantry Division (Wehrmacht)
- 155th Reserve Panzer Division (Wehrmacht)
- 155th Division (Imperial Japanese Army)
- Italian 155th Garrison Division

156th Division

- 156th Infantry Division (Wehrmacht)
- 156th Division (Imperial Japanese Army)
- Italian 156th Garrison Division

157th Division

- 157th Infantry Division (France)
- German 157th Mountain Division
- 157th Division (Imperial Japanese Army)
- Italian 157th Garrison Division

158th Division

- 158th Infantry Division (Wehrmacht)
- Italian 158th Garrison Division

159th Division

- Italian 159th Garrison Division

160th Division

- 160th Division (Imperial Japanese Army)

== 161st to 170th ==
161st Division

- 161st Infantry Division (France)
- 161st Infantry Division (Wehrmacht)
- 161st Division (Imperial Japanese Army)

162nd Division

- 162nd Infantry Division (Wehrmacht)

163rd Division

- 163rd Infantry Division (Wehrmacht)

164th Division

- 164th Infantry Division (Wehrmacht)

165th Division

- 165th Division (People's Republic of China)
- 165th Rifle Division

166th Division

- 166th Division (1st Formation) (People's Republic of China), 1948–1949
- 166th Division (2nd Formation) (People's Republic of China), 1951–1952
- 166th Infantry Division (Wehrmacht), Germany
- 166th Rifle Division, Soviet Union

167th Division

- 167th Infantry Division (Wehrmacht)

168th Division

- 168th Infantry Division (Wehrmacht)

169th Division

- 169th Infantry Division (Wehrmacht)

170th Division

- 170th Infantry Division (Wehrmacht)

== 171st to 180th ==
171st Division

- 171st Division (People's Republic of China)
- 171st Reserve Division
- 171st Rifle Division

172nd Division

- 172nd Division (People's Republic of China)
- 172nd Rifle Division

173rd Division

- 173rd Division (People's Republic of China)
- 173rd Rifle Division

174th Division

- 174th Division (People's Republic of China)
- 174th Reserve Division
- 174th Rifle Division

175th Division

- 175th Rifle Division

176th Division

- 176th Infantry Division, Wehrmacht, Germany
- 176th Rifle Division, Soviet Union

177th Division

- 177th Rifle Division

178th Division

- 178th Division (1st Formation) (People's Republic of China)
- 178th Division (2nd Formation) (People's Republic of China)
- 178th Rifle Division

179th Division

- 179th Reserve Panzer Division
- 179th Rifle Division

180th Division

- 180th Division (People's Republic of China)
- 180th Infantry Division (Wehrmacht)
- 180th Rifle Division

== 181st to 190th ==
181st Division

- 181st Infantry Division (Wehrmacht)

182nd Division

- 182nd Division (People's Republic of China)
- 182nd Infantry Division (Wehrmacht), Germany
- 182nd Rifle Division, Soviet Union

183rd Division

- 183rd Infantry Division (German Empire)
- German 183rd Volksgrenadier Division
- 183rd Infantry Division "Ciclone"

184th Division

- 184th Infantry Division "Nembo"
- 184th Rifle Division (Soviet Union)

185th Division

- 185th Infantry Division (German Empire)
- 185th Infantry Division "Folgore"

186th Division

- 186th Division (1st Formation) (People's Republic of China), 1949–1952
- 186th Rifle Division (1939 formation), Soviet Union
- 186th Rifle Division (1941 formation), Soviet Union

187th Division

- 187th Infantry Division (German Empire)

188th Division

- German Division Nr. 188

189th Division

- 189th Division (2nd Formation) (People's Republic of China)
- 189th Infantry Division (Wehrmacht), Germany
- 189th Rifle Division, Soviet Union

190th Division

- 190th Division (2nd Formation) (People's Republic of China)
- 190th Infantry Division (Wehrmacht), Germany
- 190th Rifle Division, Soviet Union

== 191st to 200th ==
191st Division

- 191st Division (People's Republic of China)
- 191st Rifle Division, Soviet Union

192nd Division

- 192nd Infantry Division (People's Republic of China)
- 192nd Infantry Division (France)
- 192nd Infantry Division (German Empire)
- 192nd Motor Rifle Division, Soviet Union
- 192nd Mountain Rifle Division, Soviet Union
- 192nd Rifle Division (1942 formation), Soviet Union
- 192nd Rifle Division (1943 formation), Soviet Union

193rd Division

- 193rd Rifle Division (Soviet Union)

194th Division

195th Division

- 195th Infantry Division (German Empire)

196th Division

- 196th Infantry Division (Wehrmacht)

197th Division

- 197th Infantry Division (German Empire)
- 197th Infantry Division (Wehrmacht)

198th Division

- 198th Infantry Division (Wehrmacht)

199th Division

- 199th Infantry Division (German Empire)

200th Division

- 200th Division (National Revolutionary Army)
- 200th Infantry Division (German Empire)

== 201st to 210th ==
201st Division

- 201st Infantry Division (German Empire)
- Italian 201st Coastal Division
- 201st Division (Imperial Japanese Army)
- 201st Motor Rifle Division

202nd Division

- 202nd Infantry Division (German Empire)
- Italian 202nd Coastal Division
- 202nd Division (Imperial Japanese Army)

203rd Division

- 203rd Infantry Division (German Empire)
- Italian 203rd Coastal Division

204th Division

- 204th Infantry Division (German Empire)
- Italian 204th Coastal Division

205th Division

- 205th Infantry Division (German Empire)
- 205th Infantry Division (Wehrmacht)
- Italian 205th Coastal Division
- 205th Division (Imperial Japanese Army)

206th Division

- 206th Infantry Division (German Empire)
- 206th Infantry Division (Wehrmacht)
- Italian 206th Coastal Division
- 206th Division (Imperial Japanese Army)

207th Division

- 207th Infantry Division (German Empire)
- 207th Infantry Division (Wehrmacht)
- Italian 207th Coastal Division

208th Division

- 208th Infantry Division (German Empire)
- 208th Infantry Division (Wehrmacht)
- Italian 208th Coastal Division

209th Division

- 209th Infantry Division (Wehrmacht)
- Italian 209th Coastal Division
- 209th Division (Imperial Japanese Army)

210th Division

- Italian 210th Coastal Division

== 211th to 220th ==
211th Division

- 211th Infantry Division (German Empire)
- 211th Infantry Division (Wehrmacht)
- Italian 211th Coastal Division

212th Division

- 212th Infantry Division (German Empire)
- 212th Infantry Division (Wehrmacht)
- Italian 212th Coastal Division
- 212th Division (Imperial Japanese Army)

213th Division

- 213th Infantry Division (German Empire)
- 213th Infantry Division (Wehrmacht)
- Italian 213th Coastal Division

214th Division

- 214th Infantry Division (German Empire)
- 214th Infantry Division (Wehrmacht)
- Italian 214th Coastal Division
- 214th Division (Imperial Japanese Army)

215th Division

- 215th Infantry Division (German Empire)
- 215th Infantry Division (Wehrmacht)
- Italian 215th Coastal Division

216th Division

- 216th Infantry Division (German Empire)
- 216th Infantry Division (Wehrmacht)
- 216th Coastal Division (Italy)
- 216th Division (Imperial Japanese Army)
- 216th Motor Rifle Division (Soviet Union)

217th Division

- 217th Infantry Division (German Empire)
- 217th Infantry Division (Wehrmacht)

218th Division

- 218th Infantry Division (German Empire)
- 218th Infantry Division (Wehrmacht)

219th Division

- 219th Infantry Division (German Empire)

220th Division

- 220th Infantry Division (German Empire)
- Italian 220th Coastal Division

== 221st to 230th ==
221st Division

- 221st Infantry Division (German Empire)
- Italian 221st Coastal Division
- 221st Division (Imperial Japanese Army)
- 221st Security Division (Wehrmacht)

222nd Division

- 222nd Infantry Division (German Empire)
- Italian 222nd Coastal Division

223rd Division

- 223rd Infantry Division (German Empire)
- Italian 223rd Coastal Division

224th Division

- 224th Infantry Division (German Empire)
- Italian 224th Coastal Division

225th Division

- 225th Infantry Division (German Empire)
- Italian 225th Coastal Division

226th Division

- 226th Infantry Division (German Empire)
- Italian 226th Coastal Division

227th Division

- 227th Infantry Division (German Empire)
- Italian 227th Coastal Division

228th Division

- 228th Infantry Division (German Empire)
- Italian 228th Coastal Division

229th Division

230th Division

== 231st to 240th ==
231st Division

- 231st Infantry Division (German Empire)

232nd Division

- 232nd Infantry Division (German Empire)
- 232nd Panzer Division

233rd Division

- 233rd Infantry Division (German Empire)
- 233rd Reserve Panzer Division (Wehrmacht)

234th Division

- 234th Infantry Division (German Empire)

235th Division

- 235th Infantry Division (German Empire)
- 235th Rifle Division, Soviet Union

236th Division

- 236th Infantry Division (German Empire)
- 236th Rifle Division, Soviet Union

237th Division

- 237th Infantry Division (German Empire)
- 237th Infantry Division, Wehrmacht, Germany
- 237th Rifle Division, Soviet Union

238th Division

- 238th Infantry Division (German Empire)
- 238th Rifle Division, Soviet Union

239th Division

- 239th Infantry Division (German Empire)

240th Division

- 240th Infantry Division (German Empire)

== 241st to 250th ==
241st Division

- 241st Infantry Division (German Empire)
- 241st Rifle Division, Soviet Union

242nd Division

- 242nd Infantry Division (German Empire)
- 242nd Infantry Division (Wehrmacht)

243rd Division

- 243rd Infantry Division (German Empire)

244th Division

245th Division

- 245th Infantry Division (Wehrmacht)
- 245th Rifle Division
- 245th Motor Rifle Division

246th Division

247th Division

- 247th Rifle Division, Soviet Union

248th Division

- 248th Rifle Division, Soviet Union

249th Division

250th Division

== 251st to 260th ==
251st Division

252nd Division

- Israeli 252nd Armored Division (1973) Yom Kippur War)
- 252nd Rifle Division (Soviet Union)

253rd Division

254th Division

255th Division

- 255th Infantry Division (German Empire)

256th Division

257th Division

258th Division

259th Division

- 259th Rifle Division, Soviet Union

260th Division

== 261st to 270th ==
261st Division

- 261st Rifle Division (Soviet Union)

262nd Division

263rd Division

264th Division

265th Division

266th Division

267th Division

- 267th Infantry Division (Wehrmacht)

268th Division

- 268th Infantry Division (Wehrmacht)

269th Division

- 269th Infantry Division (Wehrmacht)

270th Division

- 270th Rifle Division (Soviet Union)

== 271st to 280th ==
271st Division

272nd Division

- 272nd Volksgrenadier Division (Wehrmacht)

273rd Division

- German 273rd Reserve Panzer Division

274th Division

275th Division

276th Division

- 276th Volksgrenadier Division (Wehrmacht)

277th Division

- 277th Infantry Division (Wehrmacht)

278th Division

- 278th Infantry Division (Wehrmacht)

279th Division

280th Division

== 281st to 290th ==
281st Division

- 281st Infantry Division (Wehrmacht)

282nd Division

283rd Division

- 283rd Rifle Division, Soviet Union

284th Division

- 284th Rifle Division (Soviet Union)

285th Division

286th Division

- 286th Security Division (Wehrmacht)

287th Division

- 287th Rifle Division, Soviet Union

288th Division

- 288th Rifle Division, Soviet Union

289th Division

- 289th Rifle Division, Soviet Union

290th Division

- 290th Infantry Division (Wehrmacht)

== 291st to 300th ==
291st Division

292nd Division

- German 292nd Infantry Division

293rd Division

294th Division

295th Division

296th Division

297th Division

298th Division

299th Division

- German 299th Infantry Division

300th Division

- 300th Rifle Division, Soviet Union

== 301st to 310th ==
301st Division

- 301st Division (German Empire)
- 301st Infantry Division (Wehrmacht)
- 301st Rifle Division (Soviet Union)

302nd Division

- 302nd Division (German Empire)

303rd Division

- 303rd Division (German Empire)

304th Division

- 304th Division (Vietnam)

305th Division

- German 305th Infantry Division

306th Division

307th Division

308th Division

- 308th Rifle Division (Soviet Union)
- 308th Infantry Division (Vietnam)

309th Division

310th Division

== 311th to 320th ==
311th Division

312th Division

- 312th Division (Vietnam)

313th Division

314th Division

315th Division

316th Division

- 316th Rifle Division (Soviet Union)
- 316th Division (Vietnam)

317th Division

- 317th Rifle Division, Soviet Union
- 317th Division (Vietnam)

318th Division

- 318th Rifle Division, Soviet Union

319th Division

320th Division

- 320th Division (Vietnam)

== 321st to 330th ==
321st Division

322nd Division

323rd Division

324th Division

- 324th Rifle Division (Soviet Union)
- 324th Division (Vietnam)

325th Division

- 325th Division (Vietnam)

326th Division

327th Division

328th Division

329th Division

330th Division

== 331st to 340th ==
331st Division

332nd Division

333rd Division

334th Division

- German 334th Infantry Division

335th Division

336th Division

337th Division

338th Division

339th Division

340th Division

== 341st to 350th ==
341st Division

- 341st Division (Vietnam)

342nd Division

343rd Division

344th Division

345th Division

346th Division

347th Division

348th Division

349th Division

350th Division

- 350th Rifle Division, Soviet Union
- 350th Division (Vietnam)

== 351st to 360th ==
351st Division

- 351st Artillery-Engineer Division (Vietnam)

352nd Division

353rd Division

354th Division

355th Division

356th Division

357th Division

358th Division

359th Division

360th Division

- 360th Rifle Division, Soviet Union

== 361st to 370th ==
361st Division

362nd Division

363rd Division

364th Division

365th Division

366th Division

367th Division

368th Division

- 368th Rifle Division, Soviet Union

369th Division

360th Division

== 371st to 380th ==
371st Division

372nd Division

373rd Division

374th Division

- 374th Rifle Division, Soviet Union

375th Division

- 375th Rifle Division, Soviet Union

376th Division

- 376th Rifle Division, Soviet Union

377th Division

- 377th Rifle Division, Soviet Union

378th Division

- 378th Rifle Division, Soviet Union

379th Division

- 379th Rifle Division, Soviet Union

380th Division

- 380th Rifle Division, Soviet Union

== 381st to 390th ==
381st Division

- 381st Rifle Division, Soviet Union

382nd Division

- 382nd Rifle Division, Soviet Union

383rd Division

- 383rd Rifle Division (Soviet Union)

384th Division

385th Division

386th Division

387th Division

388th Division

389th Division

390th Division

== 391st to 400th ==
391st Division

- 391st Rifle Division, Soviet Union

392nd Division

- 392nd Rifle Division, Soviet Union

393rd Division

- 393rd Rifle Division, Soviet Union

394th Division

- 394th Rifle Division, Soviet Union

395th Division

- 395th Rifle Division, Soviet Union
- 395th Division (Vietnam)

396th Division

- 396th Rifle Division, Soviet Union

397th Division

- 397th Rifle Division, Soviet Union

398th Division

- 398th Rifle Division, Soviet Union

399th Division

- 399th Rifle Division, Soviet Union

400th Division

- 400th Rifle Division, Soviet Union

== 401st to 410th ==
401st Division

402nd Division

- 402nd Rifle Division, Soviet Union

403rd Division

- 403rd Rifle Division, Soviet Union

404th Division

- 404th Rifle Division, Soviet Union

405th Division

406th Division

- 406th Rifle Division, Soviet Union

407th Division

- 407th Rifle Division, Soviet Union

408th Division

- 408th Rifle Division, Soviet Union

409th Division

- 409th Rifle Division, Soviet Union

410th Division

== 411th to 420th ==
411th Division

- 411th Rifle Division, Soviet Union

412th Division

- 412th Rifle Division, Soviet Union

413th Division

- 413th Rifle Division, Soviet Union

414th Division

- 414th Rifle Division, Soviet Union

415th Division

- 415th Rifle Division, Soviet Union

416th Division

- 416th Rifle Division, Soviet Union

417th Division

- 417th Rifle Division, Soviet Union

418th Division

419th Division

420th Division

== 421st to 520th ==
421st Division

- 421st Rifle Division, Soviet Union

422nd Division

- 422nd Rifle Division, Soviet Union

430th Division

- 430th Infantry Division, Wehrmacht, Germany

444th Division

- 444th Security Division, Wehrmacht, Germany

454th Division

- 454th Security Division, Wehrmacht, Germany

459th Division

- 459th Rifle Division, Soviet Union

460th Division

- 460th Rifle Division, Soviet Union

462nd Division

- 462nd Volksgrenadier Division, Wehrmacht, Germany

463rd Division

- 463rd Rifle Division, Soviet Union

464th Division

- 464th Rifle Division, Soviet Union

467th Division

- 467th Rifle Division, Soviet Union

== 521st to 550th ==
521st Division

- 521st Infantry Division, Wehrmacht, Germany

526th Division

- 526th Infantry Division, Wehrmacht, Germany

538th Division

- 538th Frontier Guard Division, Wehrmacht, Germany

541st Division

- 541st Volksgrenadier Division, Wehrmacht, Germany

542nd Division

- 542nd Grenadier Division, Germany

543rd Division

- 543rd Volksgrenadier Division, Wehrmacht, Germany

544th Division

- 544th Volksgrenadier Division, Wehrmacht, Germany

545th Division

- 545th Volksgrenadier Division, Wehrmacht, Germany

546th Division

- 546th Grenadier Division, Wehrmacht, Germany

547th Division

- 547th Volksgrenadier Division, Wehrmacht, Germany

548th Division

- 548th Volksgrenadier Division, Wehrmacht, Germany

549th Division

- 549th Volksgrenadier Division, Wehrmacht, Germany

550th Division

- 550th Grenadier Division, Wehrmacht, Germany

== 551st to 560th ==
551st Division

- 551st Volksgrenadier Division, Wehrmacht, Germany

552nd Division

- 552nd Grenadier Division, Wehrmacht, Germany
- 552nd Airborne Warning and Control Division, United States

553rd Division

- 553rd Volksgrenadier Division, Wehrmacht, Germany

554th Division

- 554th Infantry Division, Wehrmacht, Germany

555th Division

- 555th Infantry Division, Wehrmacht, Germany

556th Division

- 556th Infantry Division, Wehrmacht, Germany

557th Division

- 557th Infantry Division, Wehrmacht, Germany

558th Division

- 558th Volksgrenadier Division, Wehrmacht, Germany

559th Division

- 559th Volksgrenadier Division, Wehrmacht, Germany

560th Division

- 560th Volksgrenadier Division, Wehrmacht, Germany

== 561st to 570th ==
561st Division

- 561st Volksgrenadier Division, Wehrmacht, Germany

562nd Division

- 562nd Grenadier Division, Wehrmacht, Germany

563rd Division

- 563rd Volksgrenadier Division, Wehrmacht, Germany

564th Division

- 564th Volksgrenadier Division, Wehrmacht, Germany

565th Division

- 565th Volksgrenadier Division, Wehrmacht, Germany

566th Division

- 566th Volksgrenadier Division, Wehrmacht, Germany

567th Division

- 567th Volksgrenadier Division, Wehrmacht, Germany

568th Division

- 568th Volksgrenadier Division, Wehrmacht, Germany

569th Division

- 569th Volksgrenadier Division, Wehrmacht, Germany

570th Division

- 570th Volksgrenadier Division, Wehrmacht, Germany

== 571st to 580th ==
571st Division

- 571st Volksgrenadier Division, Wehrmacht, Germany

572nd Division

- 572nd Volksgrenadier Division, Wehrmacht, Germany

573rd Division

- 573rd Volksgrenadier Division, Wehrmacht, Germany

574th Division

- 574th Volksgrenadier Division, Wehrmacht, Germany

575th Division

- 575th Volksgrenadier Division, Wehrmacht, Germany

576th Division

- 576th Volksgrenadier Division, Wehrmacht, Germany

577th Division

- 577th Volksgrenadier Division, Wehrmacht, Germany

578th Division

- 578th Volksgrenadier Division, Wehrmacht, Germany

579th Division

- 579th Volksgrenadier Division, Wehrmacht, Germany

580th Division

- 580th Volksgrenadier Division, Wehrmacht, Germany

== 581st to 600th ==
581st Division

- 581st Volksgrenadier Division, Wehrmacht, Germany

582nd Division

- 582nd Volksgrenadier Division, Wehrmacht, Germany

583rd Division

- 583rd Volksgrenadier Division, Wehrmacht, Germany

584th Division

- 584th Volksgrenadier Division, Wehrmacht, Germany

585th Division

- 585th Volksgrenadier Division, Wehrmacht, Germany

586th Division

- 586th Volksgrenadier Division, Wehrmacht, Germany

587th Division

- 587th Volksgrenadier Division, Wehrmacht, Germany

588th Division

- 588th Volksgrenadier Division, Wehrmacht, Germany

600th Division

- 600th Infantry Division, Wehrmacht, Germany

== 601st to 710th ==
606th Division

- 606th Infantry Division, Wehrmacht, Germany

650th Division

- 650th Infantry Division, Wehrmacht, Germany

702nd Division

- 702nd Infantry Division, Wehrmacht, Germany

703rd Division

- 703rd Infantry Division, Wehrmacht, Germany

704th Division

- 704th Infantry Division, Wehrmacht, Germany

707th Division

- 707th Infantry Division, Wehrmacht, Germany

708th Division

- 708th Infantry Division, Wehrmacht, Germany

709th Division

- 709th Infantry Division, Wehrmacht, Germany

710th Division

- 710th Infantry Division, Wehrmacht, Germany

== 711th and above ==
711th Division

- 711th Infantry Division (Wehrmacht), Germany
- 711th Division (Vietnam)

712th Division

- 712th Infantry Division, Wehrmacht, Germany

713th Division

- 713th Infantry Division, Wehrmacht, Germany

714th Division

- 714th Infantry Division, Wehrmacht, Germany

715th Division

- 715th Infantry Division, Wehrmacht, Germany

716th Division

- 716th Static Infantry Division, Wehrmacht, Germany

717th Division

- 717th Infantry Division, Wehrmacht, Germany

718th Division

- 718th Infantry Division, Wehrmacht, Germany

719th Division

- 719th Infantry Division, Wehrmacht, Germany

840th Division

- 840th Air Division, United States

968th Division

- 968th Division, Vietnam

999th Division

- 999th Light Afrika Division, Germany

== See also ==
- List of military divisions by name
