= 192nd Division =

192nd Division may refer to:

- 192nd Infantry Division (People's Republic of China)
- 192nd Infantry Division (France)
- 192nd Infantry Division (German Empire)
- 192nd Motor Rifle Division, Soviet Union
- 192nd Mountain Rifle Division, Soviet Union
- 192nd Rifle Division (1942 formation), Soviet Union
- 192nd Rifle Division (1943 formation), Soviet Union

== See also ==
- List of military divisions by number
- 192nd Regiment (disambiguation)
- 192nd (disambiguation)
