= 237th Division =

237th Division may refer to:

- 237th Infantry Division, Wehrmacht, Germany
- 237th Rifle Division, Soviet Union

== See also ==
- List of military divisions by number
- 237th Regiment (disambiguation)
