= 142nd Brigade =

142nd Brigade may refer to:

== Ukraine ==
- 142nd Mechanized Brigade

== United Kingdom ==
- 142nd (6th London) Brigade

== United States ==
- 142nd Battlefield Surveillance Brigade
- 142nd Field Artillery Brigade
- 142nd Military Police Brigade
- 142nd Signal Brigade

== See also ==
- 142nd Division (disambiguation)
- 142nd Regiment (disambiguation)
