= 249th Division =

249th Division may refer to:

- 249th Infantry Division, Wehrmacht, Germany
- 249th Rifle Division, Soviet Union

== See also ==
- List of military divisions by number
