= 215th Division =

215th Division or 215th Infantry Division may refer to:

- 215th Infantry Division (German Empire)
- 215th Infantry Division (Wehrmacht), Germany
- 215 Coastal Division, Italy
- 215th Rifle Division, Soviet Union

== See also ==
- List of military divisions by number
- 215th (disambiguation)
