= 218th Regiment =

218th Regiment may refer to:

- 218th Field Artillery Regiment, United States
- 218th Infantry Regiment, United States

== See also ==
- 218th Division (disambiguation)
- 218th (disambiguation)
