= 157th Brigade =

157th Brigade may refer to:

== Ukraine ==
- 157th Mechanized Brigade

== United Kingdom ==
- 157th (Highland Light Infantry) Brigade

== United States ==
- 157th Depot Brigade
- 157th Infantry Brigade (United States)
- 157th Maneuver Enhancement Brigade

== See also ==
- 157th Division (disambiguation)
- 157th Regiment (disambiguation)
