= Victory Division =

Victory Division may refer to:

- 5th Armored Division (United States), United States Army
- 24th Infantry Division (United States), United States Army
- 95th Infantry Division (United States), United States Army
- 312th Division (Vietnam) (Vietnamese: Chien Thang, lit. 'Victorious Division, Victory Division'), People's Army of Vietnam
- Victory Division, First Corps (Syrian rebel group) in the Syrian Civil War
- Victory Divisions (Arabic: فرقة النصر, romanized: Firqat an-Nasr, lit. 'Victory Division') of the Union of Working People's Forces in the Lebanese Civil War

== See also ==
- List of military divisions by name
- Muntasir Billah Division (Arabic: فرقة المنتصر بالله, romanized: Firqah al-Muntasir bi-llah, lit. 'God's Victory Division'), a Turkmen Free Syrian Army militia
- 43rd Infantry Division (United States) (English: Winged Victory Division), United States Army
- Division (disambiguation)
- Victory (disambiguation)
