= 156th Brigade =

156th Brigade may refer to:

== Ukraine ==
- 156th Mechanized Brigade

== United Kingdom ==
- 156th (Scottish Rifles) Brigade
- 156th (Camberwell) Brigade, Royal Field Artillery

== See also ==
- 156th Division (disambiguation)
- 156th Regiment (disambiguation)
