= 366th Division =

366th Division may refer to:

- 366th Division (Israel)
- 366th Rifle Division, Soviet Union

== See also ==
- List of military divisions by number
- 366th (disambiguation)
