= 130th Division =

130th Division may refer to:

- 130th Division (People's Republic of China)
- 130th Panzer Division, Germany
- 130th Division (Imperial Japanese Army)
- 130th Machine Gun Artillery Division, Russia/Soviet Union
- 130th Rifle Division, Soviet Union

== See also ==
- List of military divisions by number
- 130th Brigade (disambiguation)
- 130th Regiment (disambiguation)
- 130th Squadron (disambiguation)
- 130th (disambiguation)
