= 157th Division =

In military terms, 157th Division or 157th Infantry Division may refer to:

- 157th Division (People's Republic of China)
- 157th Infantry Division (France)
- 157th Mountain Division, Werhmacht, Germany, World War II
- 157th Infantry Division "Novara", Italy, World War II
- 157th Division (Imperial Japanese Army)
- 157th Motor Rifle Division, Soviet Union
- 157th Rifle Division, Soviet Union

== See also ==
- List of military divisions by number
- 157th Brigade (disambiguation)
- 157th Regiment (disambiguation)
- 157th (disambiguation)
