= 149th =

149th is the ordinal form of the number 149. 149th or One hundred and forty-ninth may also refer to:

- A fraction, 1/149, equal to one of 149 equal parts

== Geography ==
- 149th meridian east, a line of longitude
- 149th meridian west, a line of longitude
- 149th Street (disambiguation)

== Military ==
- 149th Brigade (disambiguation)
- 149th Division (disambiguation)
- 149th Regiment (disambiguation)

== See also ==
- May 29, 149th day of the year in a standard year
