= 146th Division =

146th Division may refer to:

- 146th Division (1st Formation) (People's Republic of China)
- 146th Division (2nd Formation) (People's Republic of China)
- 146th Division (Israel)
- 146th Division (Imperial Japanese Army)
- 146th Rifle Division, Soviet Union

== See also ==
- List of military divisions by number
- 146th Regiment (disambiguation)
- 146th (disambiguation)
