= 217th Brigade =

217th Brigade may refer to:

- 217th Brigade (United Kingdom)
- 217th Brigade, Royal Field Artillery, United Kingdom

== See also ==
- 217th Division (disambiguation)
