= 305th Brigade =

305th Brigade may refer to:

- 305th Artillery Brigade (Russia)
- 305th Infantry Brigade, United Kingdom
- 305th Brigade, Royal Field Artillery, United Kingdom

== See also ==
- 305th Division (disambiguation)
- 305th Regiment (disambiguation)
