= 147th Division =

147th Division may refer to:

- 147th Division (Imperial Japanese Army)
- 147th Rifle Division, Soviet Union

== See also ==
- List of military divisions by number
- 147th Brigade (disambiguation)
- 147th Regiment (disambiguation)
- 147th Squadron (disambiguation)
- 147th (disambiguation)
