= 373rd Division =

373rd Division may refer to:

- 373rd (Croatian) Infantry Division, Wehrmacht, Germany
- 373rd Rifle Division, Soviet Union

== See also ==
- List of military divisions by number
- 373rd (disambiguation)
