= 139th Brigade =

139th Brigade may refer to:

- 139th (Sherwood Foresters) Brigade, United Kingdom
- 139th Medical Brigade, United States

== See also ==
- 139th Division (disambiguation)
- 139th Regiment (disambiguation)
