= 195th Division =

195th Division may refer to:

- 195th Division (1st Formation) (People's Republic of China), 1949–1960
- 195th Division (2nd Formation) (People's Republic of China), 1969–1985
- 195th Infantry Division (German Empire)
- 195th Rifle Division, Soviet Union

== See also ==
- List of military divisions by number
- 195th Regiment (disambiguation)
- 195th (disambiguation)
