= 203rd Brigade =

203rd Brigade may refer to:

- 203rd Training Aviation Brigade, Ukraine
- 203rd (2nd North Wales) Brigade, British Army formation in World War I
- 203rd Infantry Brigade (United Kingdom), British Army formation in World War II

== See also ==
- 203rd Division (disambiguation)
