= 208th Brigade =

208th Brigade may refer to:

- 208th Anti-aircraft Missile Brigade, Ukraine
- 208th (2nd Norfolk and Suffolk) Brigade, United Kingdom
- 208th Independent Infantry Brigade (Home), United Kingdom

== See also ==
- 208th Division (disambiguation)
