= 215th Brigade =

215th Brigade may refer to:

- 215th Brigade (United Kingdom)
- 215th Brigade, Royal Field Artillery, United Kingdom

== See also ==
- 215th Division (disambiguation)
