= C209 =

C209 may refer to:

- Mercedes-Benz CLK-Class (C209), a car
- SpaceX Cargo Dragon C209, a SpaceX Dragon 2 uncrewed cargo space capsule

== See also ==
- 209 (disambiguation)
- C (disambiguation)
