= 219th Brigade =

219th Brigade may refer to:

- 219th Brigade (United Kingdom)
- 219th Battlefield Surveillance Brigade, United States
- 219th Engineer Brigade, United States

== See also ==
- 219th Division (disambiguation)
