= 147th =

147th is the ordinal form of the number 147. 147th or One hundred and forty-seventh may also refer to:

- A fraction, 1/147, equal to one of 147 equal parts

== Geography ==
- 147th meridian east, a line of longitude
- 147th meridian west, a line of longitude

== Military ==
- 147th Brigade (disambiguation)
- 147th Division (disambiguation)
- 147th Regiment (disambiguation)

== See also ==
- May 27, 147th day of the year in a standard year
