= 218th Brigade =

218th Brigade may refer to:

- 218th Tank Brigade, Soviet Union
- 218th Brigade (United Kingdom)
- 218th Brigade, Royal Field Artillery, United Kingdom
- 218th Maneuver Enhancement Brigade, United States

== See also ==
- 218th Division (disambiguation)
- 218th Regiment (disambiguation)
