= 316th Brigade =

316th Brigade may refer to:

- 316th Brigade, Royal Field Artillery, United Kingdom
- 316th Cavalry Brigade, United States

== See also ==
- 316th Division (disambiguation)
