= 209th Brigade =

209th Brigade may refer to:

- 209th Artillery Brigade (Israel)
- 209th Infantry Brigade, United Kingdom
- 209th Field Artillery Brigade, United States

== See also ==
- 209th Division (disambiguation)
