= 209th Division =

209th Division or 209th Infantry Division may refer to:

- 209th Division (1st Formation) (People's Republic of China), 1949
- 209th Division (2nd Formation) (People's Republic of China), 1949–1950
- 209th Infantry Division (Wehrmacht), Germany
- 209th Coastal Division, Italy
- 209th Division (Imperial Japanese Army)
- 209th Rifle Division, Soviet Union

== See also ==
- List of military divisions by number
- 209th Brigade (disambiguation)
- 209th (disambiguation)
