= 324th Regiment =

324th Regiment may refer to:

- 324th Cavalry Regiment, United States
- 324th Infantry Regiment, United States
- 324th (Northumbrian) Heavy Anti-Aircraft Regiment, Royal Artillery

== See also ==
- 324th Division (disambiguation)
