= 216th Brigade =

216th Brigade may refer to:

- 216th Rocket Brigade, Soviet Union
- 216th Brigade (United Kingdom)

== See also ==
- 216th Division (disambiguation)
