= 366th Regiment =

366th Regiment may refer to:

- 366th Infantry Regiment (United States)
- 366th Guards Motor Rifle Regiment, Soviet Union

== See also ==
- 366th (disambiguation)
