= 184th Brigade =

184th Brigade may refer to:

- 184th (2nd South Midland) Brigade, United Kingdom
- 184th (Deptford) Brigade, Royal Field Artillery, United Kingdom

== See also ==
- 184th Division (disambiguation)
- 184th Regiment (disambiguation)
