= C218 =

C218 may refer to:

- Mercedes-Benz CLS-Class (C218), a car
- New York City Subway car C218; a crane car, see List of New York City Subway R-type contracts
- C218, a vehicle used by Pennsylvania mass transit provider CamTran
- C218, Tasmania, Australia; see List of road routes in Tasmania
- Silverband Road (C218), Victoria, Australia; see List of road routes in Victoria
- C/218 H1, Halley's Comet as seen during the year A.D. 218

== See also ==
- 218 (disambiguation)
- C (disambiguation)
