= 148th Division =

In military terms, 148th Division or 148th Infantry Division may refer to:

- 148th Division (People's Republic of China)
- 148th Reserve Division, Wehrmacht, Germany
- 148th Division (Imperial Japanese Army)
- 148th Rifle Division, Soviet Union

== See also ==
- List of military divisions by number
- 148th Brigade (disambiguation)
- 148th Regiment (disambiguation)
- 148th (disambiguation)
