= 149th Division =

In military terms, 149th Division or 149th Infantry Division may refer to:

- 149th Division (People's Republic of China), later the 149th Army Division (1960–1969)
- 149th Motorized Infantry Division, People's Republic of China, earlier the 149th Army Division (1969–1985)
- 149th Division (Imperial Japanese Army)
- 149th Mixed Aviation Division, Russia/Soviet Union
- 149th Rifle Division, Soviet Union

== See also ==
- List of military divisions by number
- 149th Brigade (disambiguation)
- 149th Regiment (disambiguation)
- 149th Squadron (disambiguation)
- 149th (disambiguation)
