= 137th Division =

In military terms, 137th Division or 137th Infantry Division may refer to:

- 137th Division (People's Republic of China)
- 137th Infantry Division (Wehrmacht), Germany
- 137th Division (Imperial Japanese Army)
- 137th Rifle Division, Soviet Union

== See also ==
- List of military divisions by number
- 137th Regiment (disambiguation)
- 137th (disambiguation)
