= 218 (disambiguation) =

218 may refer to:

- 218 (year)
- 218 (number)
- 218 BC
- UFC 218
- 218 Bianca
- Area code 218
- The international calling code for Libya

== See also ==
- 218th (disambiguation)
