= 219th Division =

219th Division may refer to:

- 219th Infantry Division (People's Republic of China), previously the 219th Army Division
- 219th Infantry Division (Wehrmacht), Germany
- 219th Rifle Division, Soviet Union

== See also ==
- List of military divisions by number
- 219th (disambiguation)
