= 373rd =

373rd or 373d may refer to:

- 373d Fighter Group, inactive United States Army Air Force unit
- 373d Intelligence, Surveillance and Reconnaissance Group (ISRG), an Air Force Intelligence, Surveillance and Reconnaissance Agency unit located at Misawa AB, Japan
- 373d Strategic Missile Squadron, inactive United States Air Force unit
- 373rd (Croatian) Infantry Division (Wehrmacht), a division of the German Army during World War II

== See also ==
- 373 (number)
- 373, the year 373 (CCCLXXIII) of the Julian calendar
- 373 BC
