= 63rd Infantry Division (Wehrmacht) =

- 63. Infanterie-Division
- Active: 1945
- Country: Germany
- Branch: Heer (Wehrmacht)
- Type: Infantry
- Role: Decoy unit
- Size: Division (official); Regiment (de facto)

The 63rd Infantry Division (German: 63. Infanterie-Division) was a fictitious infantry division of the German army during World War II. No real division-size unit named 63rd Infantry Division existed, as the name was instead given to a regiment-sized unit. A reference was first made to the 63rd Infantry Division in an order of battle (German: Schematische Kriegsgliederung) document dated 12 April 1945, where the fictitious division was listed among the reserves of Oberkommando West. In truth, the troops dubbed 63rd Infantry Division were the "Regiment Alvensleben". The code name was assigned to the regiment on 22 March 1945.

The 63rd Infantry Division was one of the four fictitious divisions formed in the occupied Netherlands following an order on 28 February 1945. The other decoy formations formed in this way were the 219th, 249th, and 703rd divisions.
