= 142nd =

142nd is the ordinal form of the number 142. 142nd or One hundred and forty-second may also refer to:

- A fraction, 1/142, equal to one of 142 equal parts

== Geography ==
- 142nd meridian east, a line of longitude
- 142nd meridian west, a line of longitude

== Military ==
- 142nd Brigade (disambiguation)
- 142nd Division (disambiguation)
- 142nd Regiment (disambiguation)

== See also ==
- May 22, 142nd day of the year in a standard year
