= 242nd Division =

242nd Division or 242nd Infantry Division may refer to:

- 242nd Infantry Division (German Empire)
- 242nd Infantry Division (Wehrmacht), Germany
- 242nd Motor Rifle Division, Soviet Union
- 242nd Rifle Division, Soviet Union

== See also ==
- List of military divisions by number
- 242nd Brigade (disambiguation)
