= 156th =

156th is the ordinal form of the number 156. 156th or One hundred and fifty-sixth may also refer to:

- A fraction, 1/156, equal to one of 156 equal parts

== Geography ==
- 156th meridian east, a line of longitude
- 156th meridian west, a line of longitude

== Military ==
- 156th Brigade (disambiguation)
- 156th Division (disambiguation)
- 156th Regiment (disambiguation)

== See also ==
- June 5, 156th day of the year in a standard year
