= 48th Reserve Division =

Military unit of Imperial German army during WW I

48th Reserve Division (48. Reserve-Division)
- Active: 1914–1919
- Country: German Empire
- Branch: German Army
- Type: Infantry
- Size: ~15,000
- Engagements: World War I: Race to the Sea; Battle of Łódź (1914); Gorlice-Tarnów Offensive; Brusilov Offensive

The 48th Reserve Division (48. Reserve-Division) was a unit of the Imperial German Army in World War I. The division was formed in September 1914 and organized over the next month, arriving in the line in October. It was part of the first wave of new divisions formed at the outset of World War I, which were numbered the 43rd through 54th Reserve Divisions. The division was part of XXIV Reserve Corps. It was disbanded in 1919 during the demobilization of the German Army after World War I.

== Recruitment ==
The 48th Reserve Division was relatively mixed, but mostly came from the XI and XVIII Army Corps areas. The 221st and 222nd Reserve Infantry Regiments were raised in the Grand Duchy of Hesse. The 223rd Reserve Infantry Regiment was raised in the Prussian Province of Hesse-Nassau, with one battalion each from the former Electorate of Hesse, Duchy of Nassau, and city of Frankfurt am Main. The 224th Reserve Infantry Regiment was from the Thuringian states and the Prussian Province of Saxony. After the 224th Reserve Infantry Regiment was transferred to the 215th Infantry Division, the 48th Reserve Division became an even more predominantly Hessian formation.

== Combat chronicle ==
The 48th Reserve Division initially fought on the Western Front, entering the line in October between the Meuse and Moselle. It then moved to the Flanders and Artois regions in the drive northwards known as the Race to the Sea. It fought at Lille in late October and at Ypres into November. At the end of November, the division was transferred to the Eastern Front. It fought in a number of engagements, including the winter 1914 Battle of Łódź, and then participated in the pursuit of the Russians from Carpathia and Austrian Galicia known as the Gorlice-Tarnów Offensive after the major battle at Gorlice and Tarnów. The division remained in positional warfare and various engagements on the Eastern Front thereafter, and faced part of the Brusilov Offensive in 1916. From October 1916 to April 1917, the division was attached to the Austro-Hungarian 3rd Army, and was then attached to the Austro-Hungarian 2nd Army. In May 1917, the division returned to the Western Front, and occupied the line near Verdun, facing the French offensive there in August and September. The division was in the trenches in Lorraine from the end of September to the beginning of December 1917, and then in Upper Alsace until mid-February 1918. It then went into army reserve until April, when it went into the line in the Flanders and Artois regions. It remained in the fighting in the northern part of the Western Front until the end of the war. In 1917, Allied intelligence rated the division as a mediocre division. In 1918 it was rated second class.

== Order of battle on formation ==
The 48th Reserve Division was initially organized as a square division, with essentially the same organization as the reserve divisions formed on mobilization. The order of battle of the 48th Reserve Division on January 6, 1915, was as follows:

- 95. Reserve-Infanterie-Brigade
  - Reserve-Infanterie-Regiment Nr. 221
  - Reserve-Infanterie-Regiment Nr. 222
- 96. Reserve-Infanterie-Brigade
  - Reserve-Infanterie-Regiment Nr. 223
  - Reserve-Infanterie-Regiment Nr. 224
  - Reserve-Jäger-Bataillon Nr. 20
- Reserve-Kavallerie-Abteilung Nr. 48
- Reserve-Feldartillerie-Regiment Nr. 48
- Reserve-Fußartillerie-Batterie 24
- Reserve-Fußartillerie-Batterie 25
- Reserve-Pionier-Kompanie Nr. 48

== Order of battle on March 31, 1918 ==
The 48th Reserve Division was triangularized in April 1917. Over the course of the war, other changes took place, including the formation of artillery and signals commands and a pioneer battalion. The order of battle on March 31, 1918, was as follows:

- 96. Reserve-Infanterie-Brigade
  - Reserve-Infanterie-Regiment Nr. 221
  - Reserve-Infanterie-Regiment Nr. 222
  - Reserve-Infanterie-Regiment Nr. 223
- 5. Eskadron/Garde-Dragoner-Regiment Königin Viktoria von Groß Britannien u. Irland Nr. 1
- Artillerie-Kommandeur 48
  - Reserve-Feldartillerie-Regiment Nr. 48
  - I. Bataillon/Fußartillerie-Regiment Nr. 23
- Pionier-Bataillon Nr. 348
- Divisions-Nachrichten-Kommandeur 448
