= 146th =

146th is the ordinal form of the number 146. 146th or One hundred and forty-sixth may also refer to:

- A fraction, 1/146, equal to one of 146 equal parts

== Geography ==
- 146th meridian east, a line of longitude
- 146th meridian west, a line of longitude

== Military ==
- 146th Brigade
- 146th Division (disambiguation)
- 146th Regiment (disambiguation)

== See also ==
- May 26, 146th day of the year in a standard year
