= 209 (disambiguation) =

209 may refer to:

- 209 (year)
- 209 (number)
- 209 BC
- 209 series, a type of passenger train
- 209 Dido, an asteroid
- UFC 209, a mixed martial arts event
- Area code 209

== See also ==
- 209th (disambiguation)
