= Hans Hüttner =

- Born: 19 November 1885
- Died: 11 September 1956 (aged 70)
- Military career
- Allegiance: Nazi Germany
- Branch: Army (Wehrmacht)
- Rank: Generalmajor
- Commands: 167th Infantry; 703rd Infantry
- Conflicts: World War II
- Awards: Knight's Cross of the Iron Cross

Hans Hüttner (19 November 1885 – 11 September 1956) was a general in the Wehrmacht of Nazi Germany during World War II who held commands at the division and corps levels. He was a recipient of the Knight's Cross of the Iron Cross.

At the end of the war, he commanded the 703rd Infantry Division.

== Awards and decorations ==
- Knight's Cross of the Iron Cross on 4 September 1942 as Oberst and commander of Infanterie-Regiment 520

Military offices
Preceded by Generalleutnant Wolf Trierenberg	Commander of 167. Infanterie-Division; 25 November 1943 - October 1944	Succeeded by Generalleutnant Hanskurt Höcker
