= 144th Division =

144th Division may refer to:

- 144th Division (Imperial Japanese Army)
- 144th Guards Motor Rifle Division Soviet Union/Russia, 1922–2004; 2016–present
- 144th Rifle Division, Soviet Union, 1939–1956

== See also ==
- List of military divisions by number
- 144th Brigade (disambiguation)
- 144th Regiment (disambiguation)
- 144th Squadron (disambiguation)
- 144th (disambiguation)
