= 355th Division =

355th Division may refer to:

- 355th Infantry Division (Wehrmacht), Germany
- 355th Division (Imperial Japanese Army)
- 355th Rifle Division, Soviet Union

== See also ==
- List of military divisions by number
