= 157th =

157th is the ordinal form of the number 157. 157th or One hundred and fifty-seventh may also refer to:

- A fraction, 1/157, equal to one of 157 equal parts

== Geography ==
- 157th meridian east, a line of longitude
- 157th meridian west, a line of longitude

== Military ==
- 157th Brigade (disambiguation)
- 157th Division (disambiguation)
- 157th Regiment (disambiguation)

== See also ==
- June 6, 157th day of the year in a standard year
