= 148th =

148th is the ordinal form of the number 148. 148th or One hundred and forty-eighth may also refer to:

- A fraction, 1/148, equal to one of 148 equal parts

== Geography ==
- 148th meridian east, a line of longitude
- 148th meridian west, a line of longitude

== Military ==
- 148th Brigade (disambiguation)
- 148th Division (disambiguation)
- 148th Regiment (disambiguation)

== See also ==
- May 28, 148th day of the year in a standard year
