= 54th Reserve Division =

54th Reserve Division (54. Reserve-Division)
- Active: 1914-1918
- Country: Württemberg/Germany
- Branch: Army
- Type: Infantry
- Size: Approx. 15,000
- Engagements: World War I: Race to the Sea, Battle of the Yser, Second Battle of Ypres, Battle of the Somme, Second Battle of the Aisne, Passchendaele, German spring offensive, Somme Offensive

The 54th Reserve Division (54. Reserve-Division) was a unit of the Imperial German Army in World War I. The division was formed in September 1914 and organized over the next month, arriving in the line in October. It was part of the first wave of new divisions formed at the outset of World War I, which were numbered the 43rd through 54th Reserve Divisions. The division was initially part of XXVII Reserve Corps. The division was disbanded in September 1918 and its assets distributed to other units. The division was primarily raised in the Kingdom of Württemberg, but the division's 245th Reserve Infantry Regiment, 26th Reserve Jäger Battalion, and several support units were from the Kingdom of Saxony. These non-Württemberg elements were all transferred out of the division at various points, making the division all-Württemberg by early 1917.

== Combat chronicle ==
The 54th Reserve Division fought on the Western Front, entering the line in mid-October, participating in the so-called Race to the Sea and fighting in the Battle of the Yser. The division then remained in the trenchlines along the Yser until April 1915, when it entered the Second Battle of Ypres. After the battle the division remained in the line along the Yser into 1916. After two months in army reserve in the winter of 1916, the division returned to the trenchlines in the Flanders and Artois regions. It was engaged heavily in the Battle of the Somme in 1916, and returned to the line in Flanders and the Artois until the end of the year. In December 1916 and January 1917, it saw action at Verdun, and then went to the line in the Champagne region. In May 1917, it fought in the Second Battle of the Aisne, also called the Third Battle of Champagne. The division went back to Verdun in August 1917 in response to the French offensive there. In late October, it went to Flanders and saw action in the Battle of Passchendaele, also called the Third Battle of Ypres. It remained in Flanders until March 1918, and then participated in the German spring offensive, fighting in the First Battle of the Somme (1918), also known as the Second Battle of the Somme (to distinguish it from the 1916 battle). The division remained in the region and fought against the Allied offensive known as the Second Battle of the Somme (1918), also known as the Third Battle of the Somme. Allied intelligence rated the division as second class.

== Order of battle on formation ==
The 54th Reserve Division was initially organized as a square division, with essentially the same organization as the reserve divisions formed on mobilization. The order of battle of the 54th Reserve Division on September 10, 1914, was as follows:

- 107. Reserve-Infanterie-Brigade
  - Königlich Sächsisches Reserve-Infanterie-Regiment Nr. 245
  - Königlich Württembergisches Reserve-Infanterie-Regiment Nr. 246
  - Königlich Sächsisches Reserve-Jäger-Bataillon Nr. 26
- 108. Reserve-Infanterie-Brigade
  - Königlich Württembergisches Reserve-Infanterie-Regiment Nr. 247
  - Königlich Württembergisches Reserve-Infanterie-Regiment Nr. 248
- Königlich Württembergische Reserve-Kavallerie-Abteilung Nr. 54
- Königlich Württembergisches und Königlich Sächsisches Reserve-Feldartillerie-Regiment Nr. 54 (the I. Abteilung was Saxon; the II. and III. Abteilungen were from Württemberg)
- Königlich Sächsische Reserve-Pionier-Kompanie Nr. 54

== Order of battle on March 14, 1918 ==
The 54th Reserve Division was triangularized in January 1917, dissolving the 108th Reserve Infantry Brigade headquarters and sending the 245th Royal Saxon Reserve Infantry Regiment to the Saxon 192nd Infantry Division. Over the course of the war, other changes took place, including the formation of artillery and signals commands and the enlargement of combat engineer support to a full pioneer battalion. The order of battle on March 14, 1918, was as follows:

- 107.Reserve-Infanterie-Brigade
  - Königlich Württembergisches Reserve-Infanterie-Regiment Nr. 246
  - Königlich Württembergisches Reserve-Infanterie-Regiment Nr. 247
  - Königlich Württembergisches Reserve-Infanterie-Regiment Nr. 248
- Königlich Württembergische Reserve-Kavallerie-Abteilung Nr. 54
- Königlich Württembergischer Artillerie-Kommandeur 70:
  - Königlich Württembergisches Reserve-Feldartillerie-Regiment Nr. 54
  - II.Bataillon/Königlich Württembergisches Reserve-Fußartillerie-Regiment Nr. 24
- Königlich Württembergisches Pionier-Bataillon Nr. 354
  - 1.Reserve-Kompanie/Königlich Württembergisches Pionier-Bataillon Nr. 13
  - 2.Reserve-Kompanie/Königlich Württembergisches Pionier-Bataillon Nr. 13
  - Königlich Württembergische Minenwerfer-Kompanie Nr. 254
- Königlich Württembergischer Divisions-Nachrichten-Kommandeur 454
