= 215th =

215th may refer to:

Military

- 215th Battalion (2nd Overseas Battalion of 38th Regiment Dufferin Rifles), CEF, a unit in the Canadian Expeditionary Force during the First World War
- 215th Infantry Division (German Empire), a unit in the German Imperial Army during the First World War
- 215th Infantry Brigade, a British Army Home Service formation during the First World War
- 215th Independent Infantry Brigade (Home) a British Army Home Service formation during the Second World War
- CCXV (I Wessex) Brigade, Royal Field Artillery, a British Army Territorial Force unit during the First World War
- 215th Brigade, a Chinese formation (1937)
- 215th Brigade of the Afghan National Army
- 215th "Kala David"/"Sling of David" Artillery Brigade of the Israel Defense Forces' 162nd Division
- 215th Artillery Brigade in the 87th Rifle Corps of the Red Army's Far Eastern Front during the Second World War

Civilian

- 215th Street (IRT Broadway – Seventh Avenue Line), a local station on the IRT Broadway – Seventh Avenue Line of the New York City Subway

== See also ==
- 215 (number)
- 215, the year 215 (CCXV) of the Julian calendar
- 215 BC
