= 135th Division =

135th Division may refer to:

- 135th Division (People's Republic of China)
- 135th Armored Cavalry Division "Ariete", Italy
- 135th Division (Imperial Japanese Army)
- 135th Rifle Division, Soviet Union, WWII
- 135th Motor Rifle Division, Soviet Union, Cold War

== See also ==
- List of military divisions by number
- 135th Brigade (disambiguation)
- 135th Regiment (disambiguation)
- 135th Squadron (disambiguation)
- 135th (disambiguation)
