= 142nd Division =

142nd Division may refer to:

- 142nd Division (Imperial Japanese Army)
- 142nd Division (1st Formation) (People's Republic of China)
- 142nd Division (3rd Formation) (People's Republic of China)
- 142nd Rifle Division, Soviet Union

== See also ==
- List of military divisions by number
- 142nd Brigade (disambiguation)
- 142nd Regiment (disambiguation)
- 142nd Squadron (disambiguation)
- 142nd (disambiguation)
