= 203rd Division =

203rd Division may refer to:

- 203rd Infrastructure Construction Engineer Division, People's Republic of China
- 203rd Security Division, Wehrmacht, Germany
- 203rd Coastal Division, Italy
- 203rd Rifle Division, Soviet Union

== See also ==
- List of military divisions by number
- 203rd (disambiguation)
