= List of military divisions by name =

This is a list of military divisions of all nationalities that are identified by name. In many armies divisions have been given both a name and a number; they are listed here if they are commonly referred to by name in English publications.

Note that in the British Army prior to April 1915 many Regular Army and Territorial Army divisions were designated by name. After April 1915 all divisions were assigned a number. For example, the East Lancashire Division became the 42nd Division.

- ANZAC Mounted Division
- Australian Mounted Division (formerly Imperial Mounted Division)
- Australian Jungle Division
- British Devon and Cornwall County Division (later 77th Infantry Division)
- British Dorset County Division
- British Durham and North Riding County Division
- British Essex County Division (formerly West Sussex County Division)
- British Guards Division
- British Guards Armoured Division
- British Hampshire County Division
- British King's Division
- British Light Division
- British Lincolnshire County Division
- British Norfolk County Division (later 78th Infantry Division)
- British Northumberland County Division
- British Prince of Wales' Division
- British Queens Division
- British Royal Marines Division
- British Royal Naval Division
- British Scottish Division
- British West Sussex County Division (later Essex County Division)
- British Yeomanry Mounted Division (later 4th Cavalry Division)
- British Yorkshire County Division
- German Großdeutschland Division
- German Luftwaffe Hermann Göring Division (later Hermann Göring Panzer Division, 1st Hermann Göring Parachute Panzer Division)
- German Luftwaffe 2nd Hermann Göring Parachute Panzergrenadier Division
- German Luftwaffe Erdmann Parachute Division (later 7th Parachute Division)
- German Luftwaffe Meindl Division (later 21st Luftwaffe Field Division)
- German Panzer Division Kempf
- German Panzer Division Kurmark
- German Panzer Division Müncheberg
- German Panzer-Lehr-Division
- German SS Division Nord (later 6th SS Mountain Division)
- German SS Totenkopf Division (later 3rd SS Division)
- German Fortress Division Kreta
- German Fortress Division Swinemünde
- Imperial German Alpenkorps
- Imperial German Guard Ersatz Division
- Israeli Gaza Division
- Israeli West Bank Division
- New Zealand and Australian Division
- New Zealand Division
- US Americal Division
- US Philippine Division
- Vietnam Silvergrass Division (Sư đoàn Bông lau)
- Vietnam Victory Division (Sư đoàn Chiến Thắng)
- Vietnam Vanguard Division (Sư đoàn Tiên Phong)
- Vietnam Glory Division (Sư đoàn Vinh Quang)
- Vietnam Lam Hong Division (Sư đoàn Lam Hồng)
- Vietnam Delta Division (Sư đoàn Đồng Bằng)
- Vietnam Ngu Binh Division (Sư đoàn Ngự Bình)
- Vietnam Binh Tri Thien Division (Sư đoàn Bình Trị Thiên)
- Vietnam Lam River Division (Sư đoàn Sông Lam)
- 351st Artillery-Engineer Division (Vietnam)
- Vietnam Dak To Division (Sư đoàn Đắc Tô)
- Vietnam Golden Star Division (Sư đoàn Sao Vàng)
- Vietnam Thang Long Air Division (Sư đoàn Không quân Thăng Long)
- Vietnam Hai Van Air Division (Sư đoàn Không quân Hải Vân)
- Vietnam Le Loi Air Division (Sư đoàn Không quân Lê Lợi)
- Vietnam Ha Noi Air Defense Division (Sư đoàn Phòng không Hà Nội)
- Vietnam Hai Phong Air Defense Division (Sư đoàn Phòng không Hải Phòng)
- Vietnam Bac Thai Air Defense Division (Sư đoàn Phòng không Bắc Thái)
- Vietnam Da Nang Air Defense Division (Sư đoàn Phòng không Đà Nẵng)
- Vietnam Khanh Hoa Air Defense Division (Sư đoàn Phòng không Khánh Hòa)
- Vietnam Ho Chi Minh City Air Defense Division (Sư đoàn Phòng không Thành phố Hồ Chí Minh)

== See also ==
- List of military divisions by number
