= 308th Division =

308th Division or 308th Infantry Division may refer to:

- 308th Division (Imperial Japanese Army)
- 308th Rifle Division, Soviet Union
- 308th Infantry Division (Vietnam)

== See also ==
- List of military divisions by number
