= 242nd Brigade =

242nd Brigade may refer to:

- 242nd Training Centre, Russia/Soviet Union
- 242nd Mixed Brigade, Spain
- 242nd Brigade (United Kingdom)
- 242nd Brigade, Royal Field Artillery, United Kingdom

== See also ==
- 242nd Division (disambiguation)
