= 144th =

144th is the ordinal form of the number 144. 144th or One hundred and forty-fourth may also refer to:

- A fraction, 1/144, equal to one of 144 equal parts

== Geography ==
- 144th meridian east, a line of longitude
- 144th meridian west, a line of longitude

== Military ==
- 144th Brigade (disambiguation)
- 144th Division (disambiguation)
- 144th Regiment (disambiguation)

== See also ==
- May 24, 144th day of the year in a standard year
