= 322nd Division =

322nd Division may refer to:

- 322nd Division (Imperial Japanese Army)
- 332nd Static Infantry Division, Wehrmacht, Germany
- 322nd Rifle Division, Soviet Union
- 322nd Airlift Division, United States

== See also ==
- 322nd (disambiguation)
- List of military divisions by number
