= 51st Reserve Division =

51st Reserve Division (51. Reserve-Division)
- Active: 1914-1919
- Country: Germany
- Branch: Army
- Type: Infantry
- Size: Approx. 15,000
- Engagements: World War I: Race to the Sea, Battle of the Yser, Second Battle of Ypres, German spring offensive, Second Battle of the Marne, Meuse-Argonne Offensive

The 51st Reserve Division (51. Reserve-Division) was a unit of the Imperial German Army in World War I. The division was formed in September 1914 and organized over the next month, arriving in the line in October. It was part of the first wave of new divisions formed at the outset of World War I, which were numbered the 43rd through 54th Reserve Divisions. The division was initially part of XXVI Reserve Corps. It was disbanded in 1919 during the demobilization of the German Army after World War I.

== Recruitment ==
The division was relatively mixed. The 233rd Reserve Infantry Regiment (later transferred to another division) was from the Thuringian states, mainly Saxe-Coburg-Gotha and Saxe-Meiningen. The 234th Reserve Infantry Regiment was raised in the former Hesse-Kassel (or Hesse-Cassel) in the Prussian Province of Hesse-Nassau, and also included soldiers from the Principality of Waldeck. The 235th and 236th Reserve Infantry Regiments were from the Prussian Rhine Province. The 23rd Reserve Jäger Battalion was from the Prussian Province of Hanover. Most support units were from Hesse-Kassel.

== Combat chronicle ==
The 51st Reserve Division fought on the Western Front, entering the line in mid-October. As part of the so-called Race to the Sea, it fought in the Battle of the Yser in October–November 1914. It remained in positional warfare along the Yser until April 1915. It then took part in the Second Battle of Ypres, which involved the first large-scale use of poison gas in World War I. After the battle, it remained in the trenchlines along the Yser until September 1916. It saw action in the Battle of the Somme that month, and then went into the line in the Champagne region until April 1917. In May 1917, it fought in the Second Battle of the Aisne, also called the Third Battle of Champagne. It then returned to the line in the Champagne region and later fought from August to October against the French offensive at Verdun. After Verdun, it again returned to the line in the Champagne, remaining there until March 1918. The division fought in the German spring offensive and the Second Battle of the Marne, and then resisted the subsequent Allied counteroffensives, including the Meuse-Argonne Offensive. In 1918, Allied intelligence rated the division as a good second class division.

== Order of battle on formation ==
The 51st Reserve Division was initially organized as a square division, with essentially the same organization as the reserve divisions formed on mobilization. The order of battle of the 51st Reserve Division on September 10, 1914, was as follows:

- 101.Reserve-Infanterie-Brigade
  - Reserve-Infanterie-Regiment Nr. 233
  - Reserve-Infanterie-Regiment Nr. 234
  - Reserve-Jäger-Bataillon Nr. 23
- 102.Reserve-Infanterie-Brigade
  - Reserve-Infanterie-Regiment Nr. 235
  - Reserve-Infanterie-Regiment Nr. 236
- Reserve-Kavallerie-Abteilung Nr. 51
- Reserve-Feldartillerie-Regiment Nr. 51
- Reserve-Pionier-Kompanie Nr. 51

== Order of battle on February 16, 1918 ==
The 51st Reserve Division was triangularized in August 1916, sending the 101st Reserve Infantry Brigade headquarters and the 233rd Reserve Infantry Regiment to the 195th Infantry Division. Over the course of the war, other changes took place, including the formation of artillery and signals commands and the enlargement of combat engineer support to a full pioneer battalion. The order of battle on February 16, 1918, was as follows:

- 102.Reserve-Infanterie-Brigade
  - Reserve-Infanterie-Regiment Nr. 234
  - Reserve-Infanterie-Regiment Nr. 235
  - Reserve-Infanterie-Regiment Nr. 236
  - Maschinengewehr-Scharfschützen-Abteilung Nr. 73
- Reserve-Kavallerie-Abteilung Nr. 51
- Artillerie-Kommandeur 51
  - Reserve-Feldartillerie-Regiment Nr. 51
  - I.Bataillon/Reserve-Fußartillerie-Regiment Nr. 11 (from April 16, 1918)
- Pionier-Bataillon Nr. 351
- Divisions-Nachrichten-Kommandeur 451
