= 193rd Division =

193rd Division may refer to:

- 193rd Division (People's Republic of China)
- 193rd Tank Division, Soviet Union, formerly the 193rd Rifle Division and 36th Tank Division

== See also ==
- List of military divisions by number
- 193rd Brigade (disambiguation)
- 193rd Regiment (disambiguation)
- 193rd (disambiguation)
