= 237th Regiment =

237th Regiment may refer to:

- 237th Cavalry Regiment, United States
- 237th Fighter Aviation Regiment, Soviet Union
- 237th Tank Regiment, Russia
