= 209th Division (2nd Formation) (People's Republic of China) =

209th Division (1949-50)
- Active: 1949.4 - 1950.10
- Country: People's Republic of China
- Branch: People's Liberation Army
- Type: Division
- Role: Infantry
- Part of: Huabei Military Region
- Engagements: Chinese Civil War

The 209th Division (Chinese: 第209师)(2nd Formation) was created in April 1949 from several independent&garrison regiments.

The division was then composed of 625th, 626th and 627th Infantry Regiments.

In October 1950 the division was inactivated and converted to 3rd Pursuit Brigade(Chinese: 驱逐第3旅), later 3rd Aviation Division of the PLAAF.
