= 146th Division (2nd Formation) (People's Republic of China) =

146th Army Division (1969–76)
- Active: 1969.10 - 1976.2
- Country: People's Republic of China
- Branch: People's Liberation Army
- Type: Division
- Role: Infantry
- Part of: Guangzhou Military Region

The 146th Army Division (Chinese: 陆军第146师)(2nd Formation) formed in October 1968 in Hunan.

The division is under direct command of Guangzhou Military Region and was put under administrative control of 47th Army Corps. During its existence the division stationed in Hunan for agricultural production missions.

From 1970 the division was transferred to Hunan Provincial Military District's control.

In February 1976 the division was disbanded.

As of disbandment the division was composed of:

- 436th Regiment;
- 437th Regiment;
- 438th Regiment;
- Artillery Regiment.
