= 217th Division =

217th Division may refer to:

- 217th Division (People's Republic of China)
- 217th Infantry Division (Wehrmacht), Germany
- 217th Rifle Division, Soviet Union

== See also ==
- List of military divisions by number
