= Japanese 1st Division =

In the Japanese military, 1st Division may refer to:

Infantry

- 1st Division (Imperial Japanese Army)
- 1st Division (Japan)

Armoured

- 1st Tank Division (Imperial Japanese Army)

Artillery

- 1st Antiaircraft Artillery Division (Imperial Japanese Army)

Aviation

- 1st Flying Division (Imperial Japanese Army)

Guard

- 1st Guards Division (Imperial Japanese Army)
