= 139th Division =

In military terms, 139th Division or 139th Infantry Division may refer to:

- 139th Division (Imperial Japanese Army)
- 139th Rifle Division, Soviet Union

== See also ==
- List of military divisions by number
- 139th Regiment (disambiguation)
- 139th (disambiguation)
