= 216th Division =

216th Division or 216th Infantry Division may refer to:

- 216th Division (People's Republic of China)
- 216th Infantry Division (Wehrmacht), Germany
- 216th Coastal Division, Italy
- 216th Division (Imperial Japanese Army)
- 216th Rifle Division, Soviet Union

== See also ==
- List of military divisions by number
- 216th (disambiguation)
