= 184th Division =

184th Division or 184th Infantry Division may refer to:

- 184th Division (People's Republic of China)
- 184th Infantry Division "Nembo", Italy
- 184th Rifle Division, Soviet Union

== See also ==
- List of military divisions by number
- 184th Regiment (disambiguation)
- 184th (disambiguation)
