= Fiftieth Army (Japan) =

Japanese Fiftieth Army
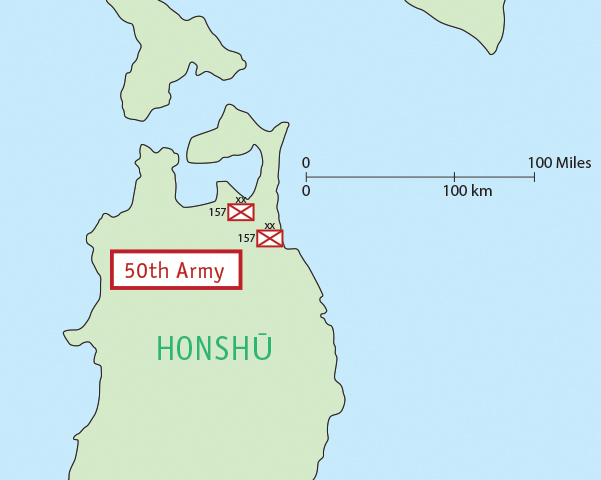
- Active: June 19, 1945 – August 15, 1945
- Country: Empire of Japan
- Branch: Imperial Japanese Army
- Type: Infantry
- Role: Corps
- Nicknames: Shun (俊, Genius)
- Engagements: Operation Downfall

The Fiftieth Army (第50軍, Dai-gojyū gun) was a field army of the Imperial Japanese Army active during the final days of World War II.

== History ==
The Japanese 50th Army was formed on June 19, 1945, under the Japanese 11th Area Army as part of the last desperate defense effort by the Empire of Japan to deter possible landings of Allied forces in the northern prefectures of the Tōhoku region of northern Honshū during Operation Downfall. The Japanese 50th Army was based in Aomori Prefecture and consisted mostly of poorly trained and poorly armed reservists, conscripted students, Volunteer Fighting Corps militia and walking wounded. It was demobilized at the surrender of Japan on August 15, 1945, without having seen combat.

== List of commanders ==
	Name	From	To
Commanding officer	Lieutenant General Toshimoto Hoshino	10 June 1945	15 August 1945
Chief of Staff	Major General Kimihide Ota	1 June 1945	1 November 1945
