= 249th Infantry Division =

German decoy division in World War II

The 249th Infantry Division (German: 249. Infanterie-Division) was a fictitious infantry division of the German Heer during World War II.

The 249th Infantry Division was one of the four divisions formed in the occupied Netherlands following an order on 28 February 1945. The other decoy formations formed in this way were the 63rd, 219th, and 703rd divisions.

The designation 249th Infantry Division was given to the garrison forces in the Hook of Holland area.
