= 208th Division =

208th Division or 208th Infantry Division may refer to:

- 208th Division (People's Republic of China)
- 208th Infantry Division (Wehrmacht)
- 208th Coastal Division, Italy
- 208th Motorized Division, Soviet Union
- 208th Rifle Division, Soviet Union

== See also ==
- List of military divisions by number
- 208th (disambiguation)
