= 142nd Division (1st Formation) (People's Republic of China) =

142nd Division (1948–50)
- Active: November 1948 – November 1950
- Country: People's Republic of China
- Branch: People's Liberation Army
- Type: Division
- Role: Infantry
- Part of: 48th Corps
- Engagements: Chinese Civil War

The 142nd Division (Chinese: 第142师) was created in November 1948 under the Regulation of the Redesignations of All Organizations and Units of the Army, issued by Central Military Commission on November 1, 1948, basing on the 31st Division, 11th Column of the PLA Dongbei Field Army. Its origin can be traced to 17th Independent Brigade of Reliao Military Region, formed in September 1946.

The division is part of 48th Corps. Under the flag of 142nd division it took part in several major battles during the Chinese Civil War.

In November 1950 the division was inactivated and converted to 5th Artillery Training Base.

As of inactivation the division was composed of:

- 424th Regiment;
- 425th Regiment;
- 426th Regiment.
