= 324th Division =

324th Division or 324th Infantry Division may refer to:

- 324th Infantry Division (Wehrmacht), Germany
- 324th Rifle Division, Soviet Union
- 324th Division (Vietnam)

== See also ==
- List of military divisions by number
- 324th Regiment (disambiguation)
