= 430th Infantry Division =

- German: 430. Infanterie-Division
- Active: 24 October 1939 – 25 July 1940
- Country: Nazi Germany
- Branch: Heer (Wehrmacht)
- Type: Infantry
- Size: multiple Battalions (officially: Division)

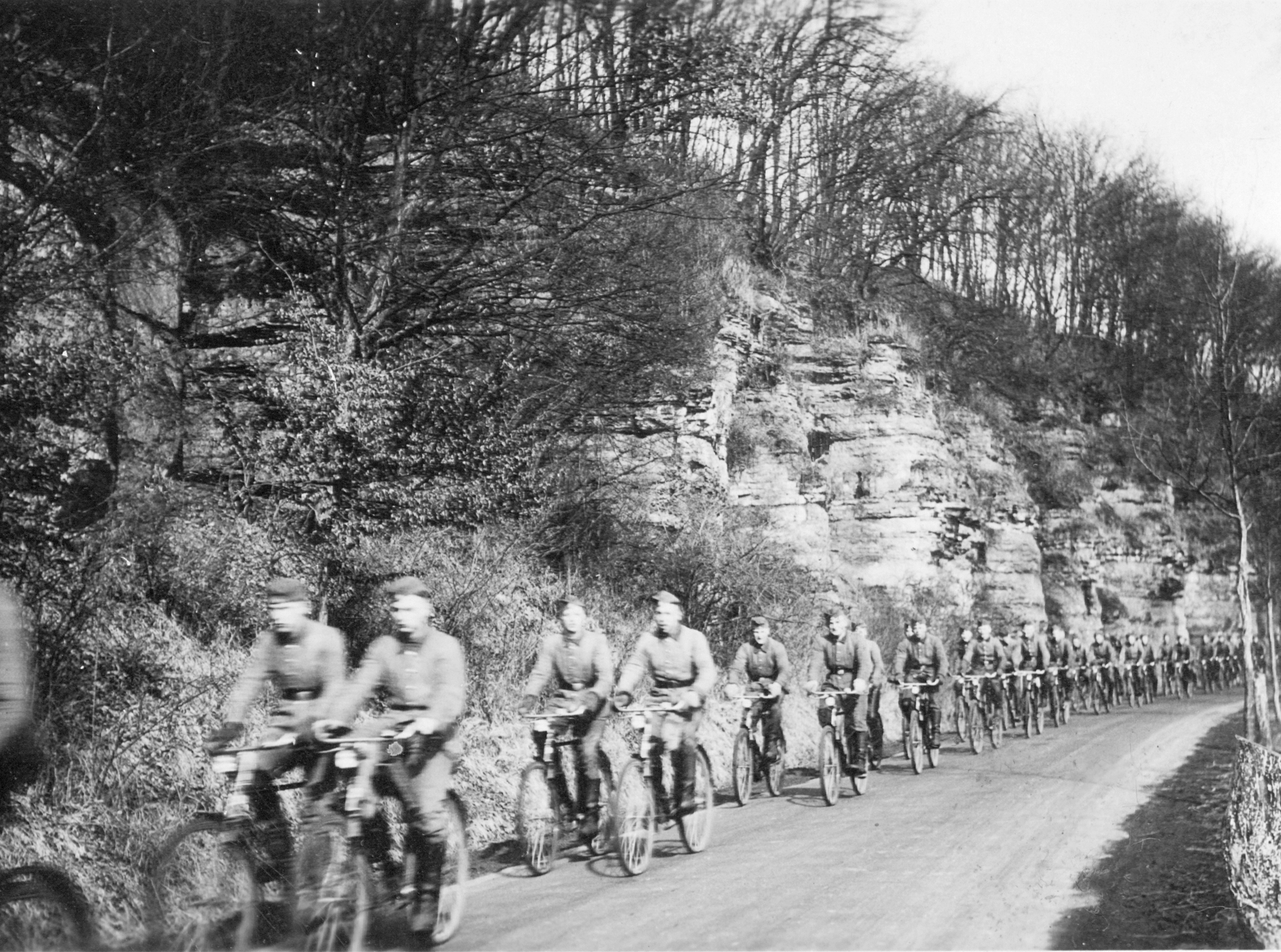
Motorcycle troops

The 430th Infantry Division for Special Deployment (German: 430. Infanterie-Division z.b.V.) was an infantry division of the Heer, the ground forces of the German Wehrmacht, during World War II. The division was active from October 1939 to July 1940. Its structure diverged immensely from the usual German infantry division, as it was used mainly to oversee guard battalions and did not contain its own dedicated infantry regiments, as infantry divisions usually did.

== History ==
The 430th Infantry Division was formed on 24 October 1939 in Cottbus in Wehrkreis III for General Command XXI (the later XXI Corps), as an aide formation to ease the guidance of multiple Landesschützen (conscript militia) forces. In March 1940, the division had four Landesschützen Battalions (301, 310, 319, 723) under its supervision, leaving it well short of the nine infantry battalions (organized into three regiments, which the 430th Infantry Division also did not have) that a regular German infantry division typically had at this time. The initial divisional commander was Kurt Schreiber, who was replaced on 1 December 1939 by Maximilian Renz.

During its occupation duties in German-occupied Poland, the 430th Infantry Division served opposite the Brody sector along the German-Soviet frontier.

On 20 May 1940, shortly after the beginning of the German invasion of the Netherlands (as part of the greater Battle of France), the 430th Infantry Division staff was ordered to join the forces in the German-occupied Netherlands and placed under the supervision of the Wehrmacht Commander Netherlands (German: Wehrmacht-Befehlshaber Niederlande), the Higher Command XXXVII. The division was subsequently dissolved on 25 July 1940; its military postal address was instead given to the Wehrmacht Command in Utrecht (German-occupied Netherlands) for continued use.

The division's personnel was divided between the 429th and 431st z.b.V. divisions, both disbanded on 26 March 1943.
