= 142nd Signal Brigade =

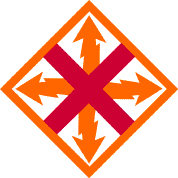
- Active: 1960-2008
- Country: United States
- Branch: Army National Guard
- Type: Signal
- Size: Brigade
- Garrison/HQ: Decatur, Alabama
- Motto: For State And Nation

Commanders
- Final Commander: Brig. Gen. Brooks Hodges
- Final Command Sergeant Major: CSM Russell L. Quinn

Insignia
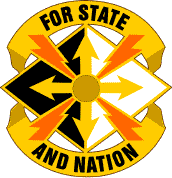
- 142nd Signal Brigade DUI

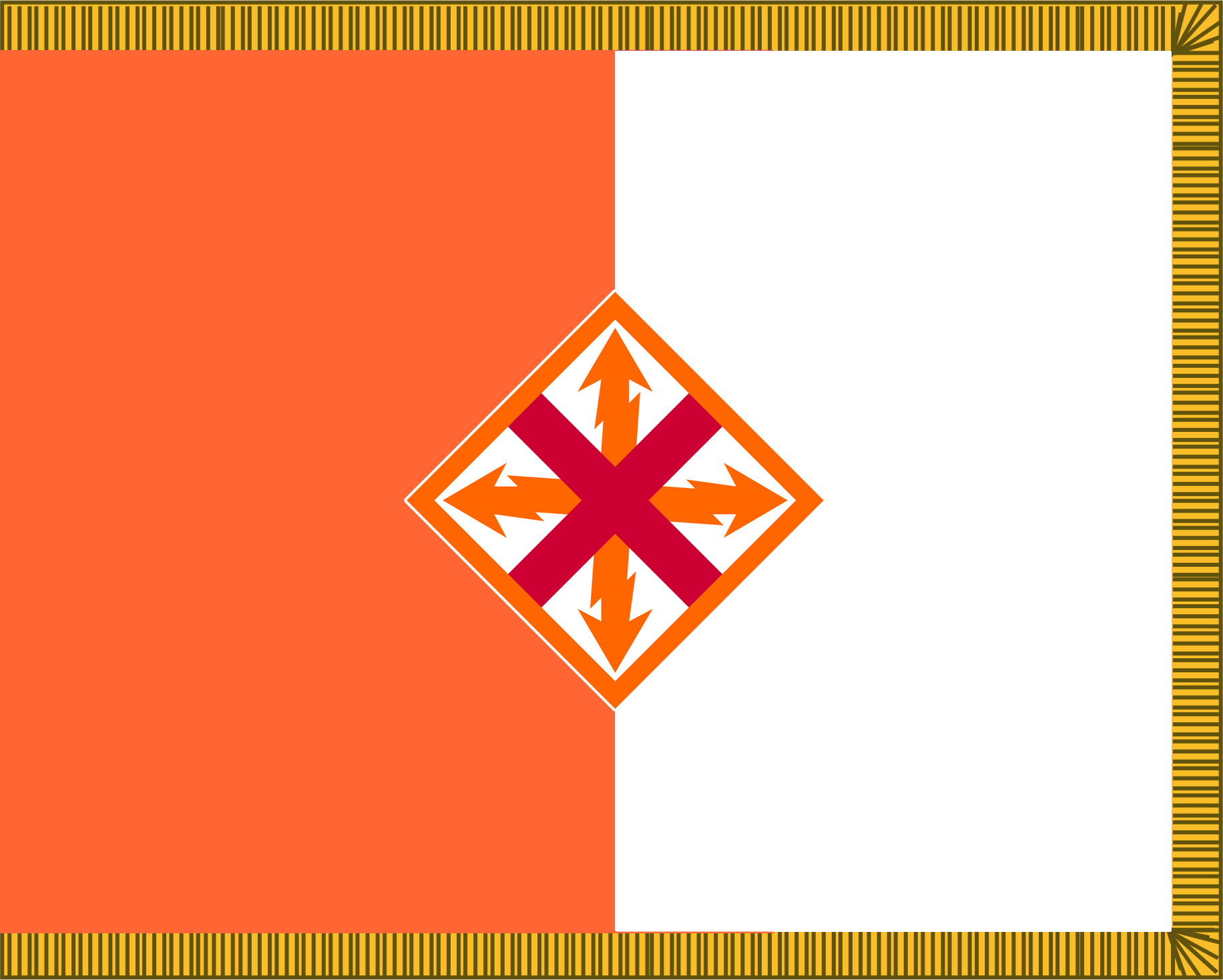
- 142nd Signal Brigade Flag

The 142nd Signal Brigade was a unit of the Alabama National Guard until August 2008. The unit was originally created in October 1960 as the HHC 142nd Signal Group in Decatur, Alabama. The unit was federalized in 1963 by President John F. Kennedy to enforce desegregation at the University of Alabama and to serve Alabama Governor George Wallace a federal restraining order. In April 1978 the unit was redesignated as 142nd Signal Brigade. In 2005, parts of the brigade were deployed in the Global War on Terror.

== Subordinate Units ==
- 29th Signal Battalion at Fort Lewis, Wash
- 279th Signal Battalion - Fort Jackson M. Balch Armory Huntsville
- 115th Signal Battalion - Florence
- 711th Signal Battalion - Mobile
