= 305th Division =

305th Division may refer to:

- 305th Infantry Division, Wehrmacht, Germany, a World War II formation
- 305th Rifle Division, Soviet Union
- 305th Air Division, United States Air Force
- 305th Division (Vietnam), part of the 5th Military Region

== See also ==
- List of military divisions by number
- 305th Brigade (disambiguation)
- 305th Regiment (disambiguation)
