= 64th Rifle Division =

The 64th Rifle Division was a designation reused twice by the Red Army for two unrelated units:

- 64th Rifle Division (1925–1941)
- 64th Rifle Division (1942–1945)

== See also ==
- 64th Guards Rifle Division
- 64th Division (disambiguation)
