= 157th Division (Imperial Japanese Army) =

- 第157師団
- Active: 1945–1945
- Country: Empire of Japan
- Allegiance: 50th army
- Branch: Imperial Japanese Army
- Type: Infantry
- Size: 10000
- Garrison/HQ: Misawa, Aomori
- Nickname: Hirosaki protection division
- Engagements: none

The 157th Division (第157師団, Dai-hyakugojūnana Shidan) was an infantry division of the Imperial Japanese Army. Its call sign was the Hirosaki Protection Division (護弘兵団, Gogu Heidan). It was formed 28 February 1945 in Hirosaki as a square division. It was a part of the 16 simultaneously created divisions batch numbering from 140th to 160th.

== Action ==
The 157th division was initially assigned to 11th area army. In June 1945, the division was reassigned to the newly created 50th army. The division spent time from 2 May 1945 until surrender of Japan 15 August 1945 building a coastal defenses in Aomori Prefecture without engaging in actual combat. The 457th and 458th infantry regiments were in Misawa, Aomori, 459th - in Hachinohe, and 460th infantry regiment - in Sanbangi town (now in Towada).

== See also ==
- List of Japanese Infantry Divisions
Japanese infantry and armored units in Home Islands, 15 August 1945

== Notes and references ==
- This article incorporates material from Japanese Wikipedia page 第157師団 (日本軍), accessed 14 July 2016
- Madej, W. Victor, Japanese Armed Forces Order of Battle, 1937–1945 [2 vols], Allentown, PA: 1981.
