= 316th Division =

316th Division or 316th Infantry Division may refer to:

- 316th Division (Imperial Japanese Army)
- 316th Rifle Division, Soviet Union
- 316th Air Division, United States
- 316th Division (Vietnam)

== See also ==
- List of military divisions by number
