= 373 BC =

373 BC in various calendars
Gregorian calendar	373 BC; CCCLXXIII BC
Ab urbe condita	381
Ancient Egypt era	XXX dynasty, 8
Pharaoh	Nectanebo I, 8
Ancient Greek Olympiad (summer)	101st Olympiad, year 4
Assyrian calendar	4378
Balinese saka calendar	N/A
Bengali calendar	−966 – −965
Berber calendar	578
Buddhist calendar	172
Burmese calendar	−1010
Byzantine calendar	5136–5137
Chinese calendar	丁未年 (Fire Goat); 2325 or 2118 — to — 戊申年 (Earth Monkey); 2326 or 2119
Coptic calendar	−656 – −655
Discordian calendar	794
Ethiopian calendar	−380 – −379
Hebrew calendar	3388–3389
- Hindu calendars
Vikram Samvat	−316 – −315
Shaka Samvat	N/A
Kali Yuga	2728–2729
Holocene calendar	9628
Iranian calendar	994 BP – 993 BP
Islamic calendar	1025 BH – 1024 BH
Javanese calendar	N/A
Julian calendar	N/A
Korean calendar	1961
Minguo calendar	2284 before ROC 民前2284年
Nanakshahi calendar	−1840
Thai solar calendar	170–171
Tibetan calendar	阴火羊年 (female Fire-Goat) −246 or −627 or −1399 — to — 阳土猴年 (male Earth-Monkey) −245 or −626 or −1398

Year 373 BC was a year of the pre-Julian Roman calendar. At the time, it was known as the Third year without Tribunate or Consulship (or, less frequently, year 381 Ab urbe condita). The denomination 373 BC for this year has been used since the early medieval period, when the Anno Domini calendar era became the prevalent method in Europe for naming years.

== Events ==
=== By place ===
==== Persian Empire ====
- The Persian King Artaxerxes II launches an invasion of Egypt to bring that country back under Persian rule. The invasion is led by Pharnabazus. After initial successes, the Greek mercenaries fighting for the Persians push on towards Memphis. However, King Nectanebo I is able to gather his forces and repulse the Persian invasion.

==== Greece ====
- Iphicrates leads an Athenian expedition which successfully relieves Corcyra of a Spartan siege.
- The ancient Greek city of Helike is destroyed by a massive earthquake and tsunami.
- The Temple of Apollo in Delphi is destroyed by an earthquake.
