= 703rd Infantry Division =

Fictitious German military unit during WW II

The 703rd Infantry Division was a fictitious infantry division of the German Wehrmacht during World War II. The troops designated as the 703rd Infantry Division never came close to the strength of an actual division.

== Operational history ==
The 703rd Infantry Division was one of the four fictitious infantry divisions that the Wehrmacht pretended to have formed in the occupied Netherlands, the others being the 63rd, 219th, and 249th Infantry Divisions.

The designation 703rd Infantry Division was given to the forces in the area of the fortress Ijmuiden in the occupied Netherlands. The Zandvoort local group received the designation Grenadier-Regiment 219, the local group Katwijk, formerly the 787th Turkic battalion, received the name Grenadier-Regiment 495, and the 24th ships cadre battalion became Grenadier-Regiment 579. The 703rd "division" was part of the 25th Army. At the end of the war, the 703rd Division surrendered to British Army troops. The division had been commanded throughout its short lifespan by Hans Hüttner.
