= 156th Division =

In military terms, 156th Division or 156th Infantry Division may refer to:

- 156th Division (People's Republic of China)
- 156th Infantry Division (France)
- 156th Infantry Division (Wehrmacht), Germany
- 156th Infantry Division "Vicenza", Italy, World War II
- 156th Division (Imperial Japanese Army)
- 156th Rifle Division, Soviet Union

== See also ==
- List of military divisions by number
- 156th Brigade (disambiguation)
- 156th Regiment (disambiguation)
- 156th (disambiguation)
