= 130th Brigade =

130th Brigade may refer to:

- 130th Infantry Brigade (United Kingdom)
- 130th Engineer Brigade, United States
- 130th Field Artillery Brigade, United States
- 130th Maneuver Enhancement Brigade, United States

== See also ==
- 130th Regiment (disambiguation)
