= 157th Division (People's Republic of China) =

157th Division (1948–49)
- Active: 1948.11 - 1949.8
- Country: People's Republic of China
- Branch: People's Liberation Army
- Type: Division
- Role: Infantry
- Part of: 44th Corps
- Engagements: Chinese Civil War

The 157th Division(Chinese: 第157师) was created in November 1948 under the Regulation of the Redesignations of All Organizations and Units of the Army, issued by Central Military Commission on November 1, 1948, basing on the 12th Independent Division of Northeastern People's Liberation Army, formed in September.

The division was a part of 44th Corps. Under the flag of 157th division it took part in the Chinese Civil War. In August 1949 the division was disbanded.

As of disbandment the division was composed of:

- 469th Regiment;
- 470th Regiment;
- 471st Regiment.
