= 149th Street =

149th Street may refer to the following New York City Subway stations in the Bronx:

- 149th Street (Manhattan)
- Third Avenue–149th Street (IRT White Plains Road Line), serving the 2 and 5 trains
- East 149th Street (IRT Pelham Line), serving the 6 train
- 149th Street–Hostos (New York City Subway), a station complex consisting of:
  - 149th Street–Hostos (IRT Jerome Avenue Line), serving the 4 train
  - 149th Street–Hostos (IRT White Plains Road Line), serving the 2 and 5 trains
- 149th Street (IRT Third Avenue Line), a defunct aboveground station, closed 1973
