= 219th Infantry Division (Wehrmacht) =

Fictitious military unit of WW2

The 219th Infantry Division (German: 219. Infanterie-Division) was a fictitious infantry division of the German Heer during World War II.

The 219th Infantry Division was one of the four divisions formed in the occupied Netherlands following an order on 28 February 1945. The other decoy formations formed in this way were the 63rd, 249th, and 703rd divisions.

The designation 219th Infantry Division was given to the garrison forces in the Alkmaar area.
