= 203rd Infrastructure Construction Engineer Division =

203rd Infrastructure Construction Engineer Division (1972-78) 27th Detachment of Infrastructure Construction Engineer （1978-84）
- Active: 1972.2 - 1984.1
- Country: People's Republic of China
- Branch: People's Liberation Army
- Type: Division
- Role: Construction Engineer
- Part of: Guangzhou Military Region
- Garrison/HQ: Shaoguan, Guangdong province

203rd Infrastructure Construction Engineer Division (Chinese: 基本建设工程兵第203师) was activated in February 1972 from 209th Geologic Survey Unit and all other units in Guangdong under the command of the Second Ministry of Machine Building. The division was composed of 9 regiments:

- 617th Regiment - Uranium prospecting unit;
- 618th Regiment - Uranium prospecting unit;
- 619th Regiment - Uranium prospecting unit;
- 620th Regiment - Uranium prospecting unit;
- 621st Regiment - Uranium prospecting unit;
- 622nd Regiment - Uranium prospecting unit;
- 623rd Regiment - Uranium mine;
- 624th Regiment - Uranium mine;
- 625th Regiment - Uranium mine;

The division was under the command of Guangzhou Military Region. Headquartered in Shaoguan, the division acted as a Uranium-related geologic survey unit in Southern China.

In July 1975 the division was transferred to Infrastructure Construction Engineer Office, Ministry of Second Machine Industry's control.

In May 1978, the division was renamed as 27th Detachment of Infrastructure Construction Engineer(Chinese: 基建工程兵第27支队). All its regiments were renamed as follow:

- 617th Regiment was renamed as 261st Group;
- 618th Regiment was renamed as 262nd Group;
- 619th Regiment was renamed as 263rd Group;
- 620th Regiment was renamed as 264th Group;
- 621st Regiment was renamed as 265th Group;
- 622nd Regiment was renamed as 266th Group.
- Uranium mine regiments were detached from the division (detachment) and reorganized into 25th Detachment of Infrastructure Construction Engineer.

In October 1978 the detachment was transferred to Second Machine Industrial Command, Infrastructure Construction Engineer's control.

On January 1, 1984, the detachment was demobilized and reorganized as Southern Geologic Survey Bureau of the Ministry of Nuclear Industry.
