= 218th Division =

218th Division may refer to:

- 218th Division (People's Republic of China)
- 218th Infantry Division (Wehrmacht), Germany
- 218th Rifle Division, Soviet Union

== See also ==
- List of military divisions by number
- 218th Regiment (disambiguation)
- 218th (disambiguation)
