= 237th Infantry Division =

Infantry division of the German Heer

The 237th Infantry Division (German: 237. Infanterie-Division) was an infantry division of the German Heer during World War II. The division was active from 1944 to 1945.

== Operational history ==
The 237th Infantry Division was formed as a static division as part of the twenty-seventh Aufstellungswelle on 25 July 1944. It was formed at the Milowitz military base in the Protectorate of Bohemia and Moravia. The initial staff officers were taken from the Shadow Division Milowitz. The division's initial regiments were the Grenadier Regiments 1046, 1047 and 1048 (each subdivided further into two battalions I and II) as well as the Artillery Regiment 237. The initial divisional commander was Hans von Graevenitz.

The division was initially deployed in August/September 1944 as part of the 14th Army (Joachim Lemelsen) under Army Group C (Albert Kesselring) to guard the Adriatic coast. In October 1944, it joined the LXXXXVII Army Corps z.b.V. (Ludwig Kübler). The corps in turn briefly served under 10th Army (Joachim Lemelsen) in January 1945 before reassignment to Army Group E (Alexander Löhr), the army group assigned to defensive duty in the Balkan peninsula. On 7 April 1945, the divisional command was passed from Graevenitz to Oberst Karl Falkner, making Falkner the second and final divisional commander of the 237th Infantry Division.

Throughout its lifespan, the division's military effectiveness was limited by its designation as a static division, which resulted in a severe lack of motorized vehicles. Therefore, the 237th Infantry Division was usually used for rearguard duty between August 1944 and March 1945. In March 1945, the division started to see heavy fighting in Italy, but was then transferred to Army Group E in the Balkans.

The division came into Yugoslav captivity north of Fiume after Germany's surrender in May 1945.

== Noteworthy individuals ==
- Hans von Graevenitz, divisional commander starting 7 July 1944.
- Karl Falkner, divisional commander starting 7 April 1945.
