= 209th =

209th may refer to:

- 209th (Swift Current) Battalion, CEF, a unit in the Canadian Expeditionary Force during the First World War
- 209th Detachment, 2325th Group, a black operation team of Republic of Korea Air Force whose task was to assassinate Kim Il-sung

== See also ==
- 209 (number)
- 209, the year 209 (CCIX) of the Julian calendar
