= 147th Brigade =

147th Brigade may refer to:

- 147th Anti-Aircraft Missile Brigade, Belarus
- 147th Mixed Brigade, Spain
- 147th Artillery Brigade, Ukraine
- 147th Infantry Brigade (United Kingdom)

== See also ==
- 147th Regiment (disambiguation)
