= 126th Machine Gun Artillery Division =

192nd Motor Rifle Division (1969–1989) 126th Machine Gun Artillery Division (1989–1998)
- Active: 1969–1998
- Country: Soviet Union (1969–1991); Russia (1992–1998)
- Branch: Soviet Army (1969–1991); Russian Ground Forces (1992–1998)
- Type: Motorized infantry
- Garrison/HQ: Blagoveshchensk

The 126th Machine Gun Artillery Division was a division of the Soviet Army and the Russian Ground Forces. It existed from 1989 to 1998. The division was originally formed as the 192nd Motor Rifle Division in Blagoveshchensk during 1969. It became the 126th Machine Gun Artillery Division in 1989 and was disbanded in 1998.

== History ==
In 1969, the 192nd Motor Rifle Division was activated in Blagoveshchensk. It was subordinated to the 35th Army. During the Cold War, the division was maintained at 70% strength. On 1 October 1989, it became the 126th Machine Gun Artillery Division. The 684th Motorized Rifle Regiment was disbanded and replaced by the 57th Machine Gun Artillery Regiment. In 1998, the division was disbanded.

== Composition ==
The division included the following units in 1988.

- 190th Motorized Rifle Regiment (Shimanovsk, Amur Oblast)
- 679th Motorized Rifle Regiment (Blagoveshchensk, Amur Oblast)
- 684th Motorized Rifle Regiment (Svobodnyy, Amur Oblast)
- 371st Tank Regiment (Svobodnyy, Amur Oblast)
- 1219th Artillery Regiment (Svobodnyy, Amur Oblast)
- 1414th Anti-Aircraft Missile Regiment (Blagoveshchensk, Amur Oblast)
- 87th Separate Missile Battalion (Svobodnyy, Amur Oblast)
- Separate Anti-Tank Artillery Battalion (Svobodnyy, Amur Oblast)
- 205th Separate Reconnaissance Battalion (Shimanovsk, Amur Oblast)
- 718th Separate Engineer-Sapper Battalion (Malaya Sazanka, Amur Oblast)
- 968th Separate Communications Battalion (Blagoveshchensk, Amur Oblast)
- Separate Chemical Defence Company (Svobodnyy, Amur Oblast)
- 286th Separate Equipment Maintenance and Recovery Battalion (Svobodnyy, Amur Oblast)
- 381st Separate Medical Battalion (Svobodnyy, Amur Oblast)
- Separate Material Supply Battalion (Svobodnyy, Amur Oblast)
