= 366th =

366th may refer to:

- 366th Bombardment Squadron, inactive United States Air Force unit
- 366th Division (IDF), also known as the "Path of Fire" Division, a reserve armored division of the IDF
- 366th Fighter Squadron, inactive United States Air Force unit
- 366th Fighter Wing, 366th Fighter-Bomber (later, 366th Operations), in the United States Air Force Air Combat Command
- 366th Infantry Regiment (United States), African American (segregated) unit of the United States Army, served with distinction in both World Wars
- 366th Motor Rifle Regiment or 7th Guards Cavalry Corps of the Soviet Union's Red Army was a cavalry corps active during the Second World War
- 366th Operations Group, the flying component of the 366th Fighter Wing, assigned to the United States Air Force Air Combat Command

== See also ==
- 366 (number)
- 366, the year 366 (CCCLXVI) of the Julian calendar
- 366 BC
