= 351st Artillery-Engineer Division =

351st Artillery Division
- Vietnamese: Sư đoàn 351
- Active: 1951-present
- Country: Vietnam
- Branch: People's Army of Vietnam
- Type: Artillery/Combat Engineer
- Size: Division
- Engagements: First Indochina War: Battle of Dien Bien Phu; Vietnam War: Battle of Khe Sanh

Commanders
- Notable commanders: General Vu Hien

The 351st Artillery-Engineer Division or 351st Heavy Division (Vietnamese: Sư đoàn 351) was the first artillery and engineering division and one of the six original "Steel and Iron Divisions" of the Viet Minh. Formed on 27 May 1951 with assistance from the People's Republic of China, it initially consisted of three regiments: 675th Artillery Regiment, 45th Artillery Regiment, and 151st Military Engineer Regiment.

== First Indochina War ==
Units from the 351st Division were attached to Viet Minh infantry divisions during the campaigns in the T'ai country between 1951–52 and 1952–53. In 1953, the Chinese People's Liberation Army supplied the division with up to 48 American M101 105mm howitzers captured from defeated Nationalists under Chiang Kai-shek during the Chinese Civil War and from US/UN forces during the Korean War, which was still raging on at that time. Some ex-Nationalist Chinese M116 75mm pack howitzers taken over by the PLA were also handed to the Viet Minh as part of communist Chinese aid to their Vietnamese allies fighting the French forces.

At the end of November 1953, Engineer Regiment 151 was ordered to improve Route Provincale 41 between Sơn La and Tuần Giáo to support the build-up of Viet Minh forces around Điện Biên Phủ, in preparation for its showdown with French Union forces gathering in the valley there.

The division fought during the Battle of Dien Bien Phu, and prior to the battle, had successfully hauled 200 dismantled artillery pieces up the hills to the east of Dien Bien Phu's valley and established well-hidden fortified positions overlooking the French fortress and outlying small garrisons from there (the Viet Minh placed their heavy artillery to the east of the French positions, while their mortars were mainly sited opposite, to the west). Throughout the battle, it maintained a deadly rain of fire from its 75 mm and 105 mm howitzers, destroying much of the French garrison holed up in the valley and subsequently destroying the two vital runways in it, while anti-aircraft artillery, serving as combat support, put all aircraft flying into the valley at great risk of getting shot down, severely restricted French aerial resupply and parachute/air-drop missions. The 105 mm howitzers were divided into two sections, one positioned north-east of French strongpoint Beatrice and the other in the north of the valley, with each gun having 217 men allocated to it, of whom 118 were porters.

In September 1954, the division was bolstered with a newly established 63rd Artillery Regiment and 67th Artillery Regiment. The 675th Regiment, however, was detached from the 351st and upgraded to 675th Artillery Division, consisting of three artillery regiments: 84th, 52nd and 56th.

== Vietnam War ==
In 1968, the division took part in the Battle of Khe Sanh. Of the 12,000 men, the division lost about 1000 due to B-52 bombings and napalm bombs

== Post Vietnam War ==
The division was later reorganized into PAVN Artillery Command, directing PAVN's Artillery Academy and holding nominal control over other artillery units

== Notable Members ==
- Commander General Nguyen Duc Huy
