= 192nd Mountain Rifle Division =

- Active: 1940–1941
- Country: Soviet Union
- Branch: Red Army
- Type: Infantry
- Role: Mountain Infantry
- Size: Division
- Engagements: Operation Barbarossa; Battle of Uman

Commanders
- Notable commanders: Col. Stepan Dmitrievich Gubin

The 192nd Mountain Rifle Division was formed as a specialized infantry division of the Red Army beginning in November 1940, in the Kharkov Military District. When the German invasion of the Soviet Union began it was in the Kiev Special Military District, assigned to 13th Rifle Corps of 12th Army in the foothills of the Carpathian Mountains. It saw little combat in the first week, as it was positioned outside the main German axes of attack, but was soon forced to retreat into the plains, where it began suffering severe losses. By early August, while still under 12th Army, it was trapped in the German encirclement near Uman. All of the 192nd, apart from one regiment, was soon destroyed; it was stricken from the Red Army's order of battle on September 19 and was never rebuilt.

== Formation ==
The division began forming in November 1940 at Voroshilovgrad in the Kharkov Military District. This process was officially completed on January 15, 1941. Based on the prewar shtat (table of organization and equipment) for mountain rifle divisions, as of June 22 its order of battle was as follows:

- 427th Mountain Rifle Regiment
- 618th Mountain Rifle Regiment
- 676th Mountain Rifle Regiment
- 753rd Mountain Rifle Regiment
- 298th Artillery Regiment
- 579th Howitzer Artillery Regiment
- 176th Antitank Battery
- 313th Antiaircraft Battalion
- 164th Cavalry Squadron
- 200th Sapper Battalion
- 179th Signal Battalion
- 24th Artillery Park Battalion
- 153rd Medical/Sanitation Battalion
- 45th Motor Transport Battalion
- 147th Divisional Veterinary Hospital
- 452nd Field Postal Station
- 361st Field Office of the State Bank

Col. Stepan Dmitrievich Gubin had been appointed to command the division on January 15. It had the four rifle regiment structure (without rifle battalions) of mountain rifle divisions, but had several departures from the normal shtat, mostly in regards to the artillery.

In May the 192nd was moved to the Kiev Special Military District, which became the Kiev Military District on June 22. At this time it was in Southwestern Front's 12th Army as part of 13th Rifle Corps, which also contained the 44th and 58th Mountain Rifle Divisions. In common with most mountain divisions it was under strength even by peacetime standards, with 8,865 officers and men, 3,021 horses, 8,043 rifles and carbines, 1,780 semiautomatic rifles, 300 submachine guns, 349 light machine guns, 147 heavy machine guns, eight 45mm antitank guns, 32 76mm cannon or howitzers, 24 122mm howitzers, 112 mortars of all calibres, 134 trucks, and a single tractor.

== Battle of Uman ==
Prior to the German offensive the Corps, like most of the Red Army's forces, was held some distance behind the frontier (in this case, some 100km), in a vain effort to avoid provoking an attack. By 1800 hours the forward detachments had reached the defensive area. Army Group South had also deployed light forces on this sector, consisting of XXXXIX Mountain Corps, LII Army Corps, and the Hungarian VIII Army Corps. In the first days, 12th Army faced little pressure, but on June 27 the 13th Corps began to fall back to new positions on a line from Drohobych to Boryslav to Tukhlia to Slavske.

By July 1, 12th Army consisted of 13th Corps plus a pair of fortified regions. The 192nd had fallen back to the Zbruch River, between Sataniv and Husiatyn, by July 7 and was facing the 100th and 101st (Light) Infantry Divisions; the latter had forced a crossing at Husiatyn against 44th Mountain Division. In this defensive fighting the 192nd was losing up to five percent of its strength per day. By day's end on July 11 it was defending against 1st and 4th Mountain Divisions south of Proskuriv, and by three days later it, with its Corps, was attempting to hold west of Bar.

During the next nine days the retreat of the 192nd continued, crossing the Southern Bug River at Vinnytsia and reaching Orativ by the end of July 23. It was clear by now that the forces of 12th Army, and 6th Army to the north, were threatened with encirclement, as forces of 1st Panzer Group began driving south, east of Orativ. Late in the month the division was transferred to the 8th Rifle Corps, still in 12th Army, which was now part of Southern Front. These command rearrangements were of little import as the catastrophe unfolded. The only element of the division to survive was the 676th Rifle Regiment, which was detached on August 6 to the 15th Motorized Division as a third rifle regiment to convert that unit into a regular rifle division. The 192nd was officially written off on September 19.
