= 215th Coastal Division =

Royal Italian Army infantry division during World War II

- Active: 1943 – 1943
- Country: Kingdom of Italy
- Branch: Royal Italian Army
- Size: Division
- Garrison/HQ: Massa Marittima
- Engagements: World War II

Insignia
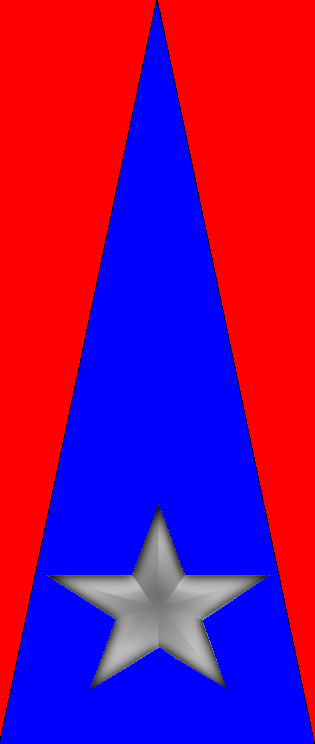
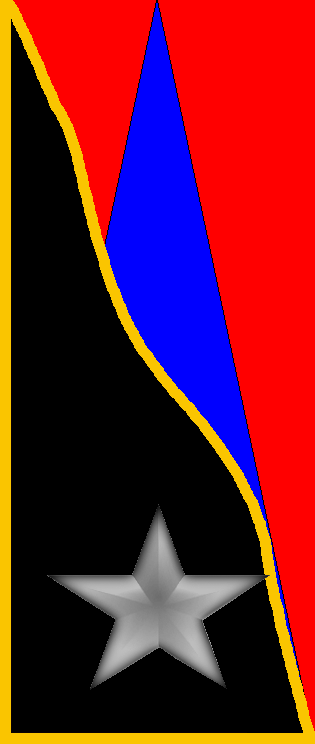
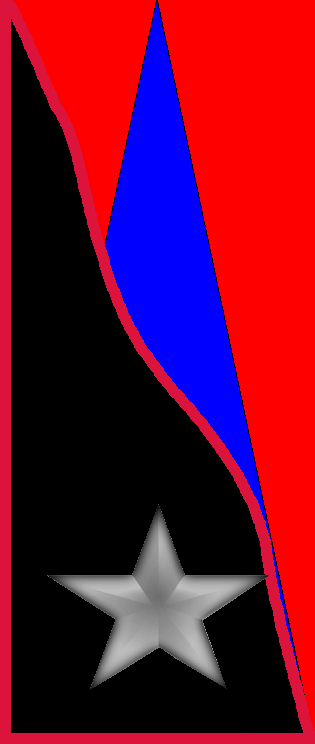
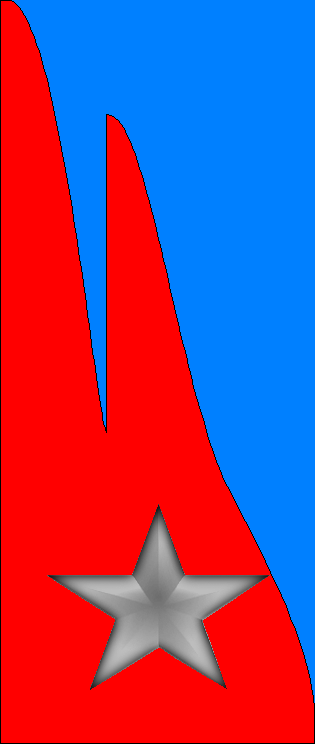
- Identification symbol: 215th Coastal Division gorget patches

The 215th Coastal Division (Italian: 215ª Divisione Costiera) was an infantry division of the Royal Italian Army during World War II. Royal Italian Army coastal divisions were second line divisions formed with reservists and equipped with second rate materiel. They were often commanded by officers called out of retirement.

== History ==
The division was activated on 1 August 1943 in Florence by expanding the XVI Coastal Brigade and adding the Autonomous Sector Piombino-Elba. The division was assigned to II Army Corps and based its headquarter in Massa Marittima. The division was responsible for the coastal defense of the coast of southern Tuscany from Cap San Vincenzo in San Vincenzo to Albinia. The division was also responsible for the defense of the islands of the Tuscan Archipelago and the harbor of Piombino.

After the announcement of the Armistice of Cassibile on 8 September 1943 the division's commander Cesare Maria De Vecchi authorized German forces to enter the port of Piombino and forbade to resist the invading German forces. The order was ignored by the Royal Italian Navy and army units in Piombino, which supported by the local population, fought a battle against the Germans on 10 September, that left more than 100 Germans dead and about 200 prisoners in Italian hands. The following day De Vecchi ordered to free the Germans and return their weapons to them, after which he signed the surrender of his division to the Germans.

== Organization ==
- 215th Coastal Division, in Massa Marittima
  - 6th Coastal Regiment
  - 14th Coastal Regiment
  - 108th Coastal Regiment (on the island of Elba)
    - 4 × Coastal battalions
    - 2 × Machine gun battalions
  - 27th Coastal Artillery Regiment
    - Coastal artillery groups (4 × groups on the island of Elba)
  - XIX Tank Battalion M (M15/42 tanks and Semovente da 75/34 self-propelled guns)
  - 1 × Machine Gun Battalion
  - 518th Coastal Artillery Battery
  - 1300th Anti-aircraft Battery
  - 3rd Anti-paratroopers Unit
  - 207th Anti-paratroopers Unit
  - 215th Carabinieri Section
  - 131st Field Post Office
  - Division Services

== Commanding officers ==
The division's commanding officers were:

- Generale di Divisione Cesare Maria De Vecchi (1 August 1943 - 11 September 1943)
