= 218th =

218th may refer to:

- 218th (Edmonton) Battalion, CEF, was a unit in the Canadian Expeditionary Force during the First World War
- 218th Infantry Division (Germany), a large military unit that served in World War II
- 218th Maneuver Enhancement Brigade (United States), a maneuver enhancement brigade of the United States Army National Guard of South Carolina

== See also ==
- 218 (number)
- 218, the year 73 (LXXIII) of the Julian calendar
- 218 BC
