= 215th Infantry Division (German Empire) =

215th Infantry Division (215. Infanterie-Division)
- Active: 8 September 1916 to 16 March 1919
- Country: German Empire
- Branch: Army
- Type: Infantry
- Size: Approx. 15,000
- Engagements: World War I: Eastern Front; Occupation of Ukraine

The 215th Infantry Division (German: 215. Infanterie-Division) was a unit in the German Imperial Army during World War I. Created in September 1916, it primarily saw service on the Eastern Front and in Ukraine.

== Order of battle (May 1918) ==
- 61. Reserve-Infanterie-Brigade
  - Reserve-Ersatz-Regiment Nr. 2
  - Landwehr-Infanterie-Regiment Nr. 71
  - Reserve-Infanterie-Regiment Nr. 224
  - 3. Eskadron/Reserve-Husaren-Regiment Nr. 8
- Artillerie-Kommandeur Nr. 215
  - Feldartillerie-Regiment Nr. 274
- Division-Nachrichtung-Kommandeur Nr. 215

== Chronology ==
1916

- 15 September – 17 September – In reserve behind Armee-Abteilung A in France
- 18 September – 2 November – Frontline service in Champagne
- 2–8 November – Transported to the Eastern Front
- 8 November – 31 December – Frontline service on Upper Styr and Stochod rivers

1917

- 1 January – 1 December – Frontline service on Upper Styr and Stochod rivers
- 2 December – 17 December – Ceasefire on Eastern Front
- 18 December – 31 December – Armistice on Eastern Front

1918

- 1 January – 18 February – Armistice on Eastern Front
- 18 February – 21 June – Service in Ukraine
- 22 June – 5 November – Occupation of Ukraine
- 16 November – 31 December – Withdrawal from Ukraine

1919

- 1 January – 16 March – Withdrawal from Ukraine

== Commanders ==
- 7 September to 9 September 1916 Generalmajor Otto Ulrich (1855–1937)
- 10 September 1916 Generalmajor (as of 27 January 1918 Generalleutnant) Max Carl Erdmann Gronau (1855–1945)

== Sources ==
- 215. Infanterie-Division (Chronik 1916/1918)
