= Battle of Guadalajara order of battle =

This is the order of battle for the Battle of Guadalajara during the Spanish Civil War.

== Nationalists ==
- División Soria – General José Moscardó
  - I Brigade – Colonel Esteban Infantes (4,800 men employed in the Somosierra)
  - II Brigade – Colonel Marzo
    - 1st Agrupación – Lieutenant Colonel Sotelo
      - Battalion de América
      - Battalion Bailén
      - Battalion Toledo
      - Battalion La Victoria
      - 1 Compañía de carros
      - 1 Artillery Group 75mm
      - 2 Sections of Antitank Guns and antiaircraft 20mm,
      - 1 Combat Engineer and Services Company
    - 2nd Agrupación – Comandante Ibáñez de Aldecoa
      - Battalion Gerona
      - Tercio de Requetés de Burgos
      - 11th Bandera de Falange
      - 1 Artillery section 75mm
      - 1 Artillery Group 77mm
      - 1 Combat Engineer and Services Company
    - 3rd Agrupación – Lieutenant Colonel Villalba
      - Battalion Aragón
      - Battalion San Quintín
      - 1 Bandera de F. E. de Burgos-Alava
      - 1 Artillery battery 75mm
      - 1 Artillery battery 105mm
      - 1 Combat Engineer and Services Company
    - Agrupación de Caballería – Comandante Pita Da Veiga
      - 4 escuadrones de sables y una sección de armas automáticas.
    - Reserva del Mando
      - 1 Artillery battery 155mm
      - 1 Pontoonier Unit
  - III Brigade – Colonel Los Arcos (sent to be a reserve, not involved in the battle)

Corpo Truppe Volontarie – General de División Mario Roatta

- 4th Division "Littorio" (Lictor) – General de Brigada Annibale Bergonzoli
- 1st CCNN Division "Dio lo Vuole" ("God wants it") – General de Brigada Edmondo Rossi
- 2nd CCNN Division "Fiamme Nere" ("Black Flames") – General de Brigada Guido Amerigo Coppi
  - XXIII de Marzo Group
  - Attached artillery – Teniente Coronel Bottari
    - X Group 75/27 (3 batteries of 4 guns)
    - I Group 100/17 (2 batteries of 4 guns)
    - II Group 100/17 (2 batteries of 4 guns)
    - II Group 105/28 (2 batteries of 3 guns)
    - IV Group 149/12 (2 batteries of 3 guns)
    - Platoon of Combat Engineers
    - Artillery Park Section
- 3rd CCNN Division "Penne Nere" ("Black Feathers") – General de Brigada Luigi Nuvoloni
- Tank and Armoured Cars Group
- Corps Artillery – General de Brigada Ugo Zanotti
  - VIII Group 75/27 (3 batteries of 4 guns)
  - VII Group 75/27 (3 batteries of 4 guns)
  - III Group 100/17 (2 batteries of 4 guns)
  - IV Group 100/17 (2 batteries of 4 guns)
  - V Group 100/17 (2 batteries of 4 guns)
  - VI Group 100/17 (2 batteries of 4 guns)
  - II Group 105/28 (2 batteries of 3 guns)
  - IV Group 105/28 (2 batteries of 3 guns)
  - I Group 149/12 (2 batteries of 3 guns)
  - III Grupo de 149/12 (2 batteries of 3 guns)
  - 75mm Battery C.K.
  - AA Battery 20mm
  - Engineer Section
  - Artillery Park Section
- Engineer Group – General de Brigada Michele Molinari
  - 1 Mixed Company (vehicle repair)
  - 1 Radio and Signal Company
  - Independent Radio and Signal unit
  - Interception unit

== Republicans ==
IV Army Corps – Lt. Col. Enrique Jurado Barrio

- 11th Division – Enrique Líster
- 12th Division – Víctor Lacalle (replaced by Nino Nanetti after three days)
- 14th Division – Cipriano Mera
- 42nd Mixed Brigade (Flank guard)
- 1st Mobile Brigade – Valentín González
  - 1st Battalion
  - 2nd Battalion
  - 3rd Battalion
  - 4th Battalion
- 33rd Mixed Brigade – Comandante Mulet
  - Batallón Teruel
  - Batallón 1st de Mayo
  - Batallón Madrid
  - Batallón 11th Regiment
  - Batallón 9th Regiment
- 1st Cavalry Brigade – Comandante Aguado
  - 1st Regiment
    - 1st Squadron Group – Captain Jose Gonzalez Caparras
    - 2nd Squadron Group – Captain Isidoro Infantes Rico
  - 2nd Regiment "Jesus Hernandez" – Comandante Cruz
    - Cavalry Squadron of the XII Mixed Brigade
- 6 Fortification Battalions

== Sources ==
- de Mesa, José Luis, El regreso de las legiones: (la ayuda militar italiana à la España nacional, 1936–1939), García Hispán, Granada:España, 1994 ISBN 84-87690-33-5
