= Enzo Savorgnan di Brazzà =

Italian Fascist politician and soldier (1910-1945)

Prefect of the Province of Varese
- In office 18 August 1944 – 23 April 1945
- Preceded by: Mario Bassi
- Succeeded by: Paolo Della Bella

Prefect of the Province of Reggio Emilia
- In office 25 October 1943 – 18 August 1944
- Preceded by: Luigi Gardini
- Succeeded by: Almo Vanelli

Federal Secretary of the National Fascist Party of Trapani
- In office March 1940 – June 1943

Federal Secretary of the National Fascist Party of Verona
- In office 2 July 1943 – 25 July 1943
- Member of the Chamber of Fasces and Corporations
- In office 23 March 1939 – 5 August 1943

Personal details
- Born: 10 October 1910 Cormons, Kingdom of Italy
- Died: 28 April 1945 (aged 34) Varese, Italy
- Party: National Fascist Party; Republican Fascist Party

Military service
- Allegiance: Kingdom of Italy
- Branch/service: Royal Italian Army; MVSN
- Battles/wars: Second Italo-Ethiopian War; Battle of Amba Aradam; Spanish Civil War; World War II; Greco-Italian War
- Awards: Silver Medal of Military Valor; Bronze Medal of Military Valor; War Cross for Military Valor (three times); Military Order of Savoy

Enzo Savorgnan di Brazzà, Count of Montaspro (10 October 1910 – 28 April 1945) was an Italian Fascist politician and soldier, member of the Chamber of Fasces and Corporations, federal secretary of the PNF in Trapani and Verona between 1940 and 1943, and prefect of the province of Reggio Emilia and later of the province of Varese during the Italian Social Republic.

== Biography ==
=== Early life and career ===
Born into the noble Friulian family of Savorgnan, he graduated in Law and Political Science. Initially oriented towards a diplomatic career, he was distracted from political activity and war events; he joined the National Fascist Party and in 1935, at age twenty-five, he volunteered during the war in Ethiopia, as captain in the 1st CC.NN. Division "23 Marzo", fighting in the battle of Amba Aradam. In 1938 he volunteered for the Spanish Civil War on the Francoist side, while being appointed deputy federal secretary of the National Fascist Party in Aosta. He then became federal secretary of the PNF of Trapani from March 1940 to June 1943, as well as member of the Chamber of Fasces and Corporations.

In 1940, following Italy's entry into the Second World War, he left for the Greek-Albanian front with the rank of captain in the 21st Infantry Division Granatieri di Sardegna. Over the course of his military career, he was awarded a silver medal, two bronze medals and three War Crosses for military valor. Following the worsening of the military situation he returned to his post in Trapani, where he witnessed the devastating bombing raid of 6 April 1943. In the same period he married Fernanda Francisci, daughter of MVSN General Enrico Francisci. From 2 to 25 July 1943 he was federal secretary of the PNF in Verona.

=== Prefect of Reggio Emilia ===
After the fall of the Fascist regime on 25 July 1943 Savorgnan was recalled into service in the Grenadiers of Sardinia by the new Badoglio government, but after the Armistice of Cassibile on the following September he returned to Verona, where he helped reopen the fascist federation. He then joined the Italian Social Republic, and on 25 October 1943 he was appointed Prefect of Reggio Emilia.

On 27 December 1943, following the killing by the partisans of the municipal secretary of Bagnolo in Piano Davide Onfiani, Savorgnan was part of the special tribunal that sentenced to death in reprisal the seven Cervi Brothers, members of the Resistance, and Quarto Camurri, a Blackshirt deserter who had joined the Resistance. All were executed by firing squad on the following day. Nonetheless, the killings of fascists continued, and on 10 January 1944, after the killing of the GNR soldier Luigi Maccaferri, curfew was anticipated at 8 pm and it was proclaimed that anybody found in "illegal possession of weapons" would be sentenced to death. A further anticipation of the curfew at 5.30pm followed after the assassination of the ENR Lieutenant Luciano Loldi on January 17; on the following day private Gino Orlandi was ambushed and killed and GNR sergeant Angelo Ferretti was wounded by the GAP, and Savorgnan summoned the Special Tribunal, which sentenced nine captured partisans to death in reprisal. The sentence was carried out on 30 January 1944. On 19 March 1944 Savorgnan issued a proclamation stating that anyone who assisted the partisans would be arrested and "judged according to the laws of war".

=== Prefect of Varese and death ===
Savorgnan (center) during a military review in Trapani, May 1940

In June 1944 Savorgnan was replaced at the head of the province of Reggio Emilia by the new prefect Almo Vanelli, and took over the leadership of the province of Varese on 18 August, replacing Mario Bassi. A few days before he took office, German troops executed eleven civilians from Borgo Ticino, including a member of the Republican Fascist Party, in reprisal for a partisan attack that had wounded four German soldiers. Savorgnan, worried that this massacre could be linked to him and stain his reputation just as he assumed the new post, protested with the Ministry of the Interior. He then supervised operations against the Resistance in the province of Varese; successful operations by the Republican National Guard and the 16th Black Brigade "Dante Gervasini" of Varese led to the arrest of numerous Christian Democrat partisans who were believed to have carried out attacks against industrial and military structures, and who were placed at the disposal of the Special Tribunal, and the information obtained from a captured partisan linked to the Garibaldi Brigades allowed in October 1944 to disrupt their operations in the region.

Following the sabotage of an electrical control unit in Gemonio, curfew was anticipated at 8 pm, and public places were closed. On 24 November, following the killing in Travedona-Monate of the deputy federal secretary of the PFR of Milan Gianni Locatelli and his wife Elvira, Savorgnan published a proclamation stating that if such attacks continued, "one or more individuals guilty of serious crimes, captured or currently detained", would be executed in reprisal after each attacks. On 19 November a deserter from the Black Brigades was shot and on 12 December a peasant woman who had hosted partisans in her farmhouse suffered the same fate. On January 5, 1945, five partisans were killed by the Blue Air Force Battalion during a roundup. In the meantime, also due to the influx of refugees from Milan, the food situation in Varese was worsening, making various foodstuffs such as flour and meat unobtainable; Savorgnan ordered that all local restaurants were to be turned into "war canteens" with fixed prices.

The resurgence of the partisan movement in the spring of 1945 led Savorgnan to issue new directives, including one in which he ordered "to react with force and vigor to the treacherous killings of fascists that have also intensified against women in recent days. Apply the rigor of the law even to the women of the opposing camp who operate against us with so much poison and ferocity". On 23 April 1945 he was replaced in his post by new prefect Paolo Della Bella, former head of the Varese GUF. He remained in Varese with his wife and son, and on 25 April he was taken prisoner at his house by the partisans. Sentenced to death by a partisan tribunal for treason and first-degree murders under Italian law (since Brazzà legally committed no war crimes as the laws of wars at the time did not deal with non-international armed conflict (NIAC)), he was executed by firing squad on 28 April, together with Leopoldo Gagliardi, PFR federal secretary of Varese and commander of the local Black Brigade, police commissioner Corrado Belluomo, head of the anti-Jewish section of the questura of Varese, and three Black Brigades soldiers. The execution was carried out in the Bettole horse racing venue, where three partisans had been shot by the Black Brigades on 7 October 1944. He was buried in the local cemetery, from which his remaines were exhumed in 1959 and reburied in the family tomb in Cormons.
