= Nationalist faction (Spanish Civil War) =

Major faction in the Spanish Civil War of 1936 to 1939

- Bando nacional
- Flag until and from 1938
- Leaders: Francisco Franco; José Sanjurjo †; Emilio Mola †; Manuel Goded Llopis (executed)
- Dates active: 17 July 1936 – 1 April 1939
- Active regions: Nationalist zone
- Ideology: Spanish ultranationalism Radical anti-communism Authoritarian conservatism National palingenesis Right-wing populism Proto-fascism (varying) (Note: Shubert 2023, p. 320:"European historians still disagree over the definitions and boundaries of 'fascist Europe', but the idea of a spectrum of right-wing movements heavily influenced by the growing fascist presence has added a nuanced perspective to the question of whether the Nationalist camp was part of the European fascist project or not. Concepts like fascistization, para-fascist or fascistized capture the sense of dynamism and hybridity that have challenged binary frameworks."; Casanova 2010, pp. 10:"As such, although a 'genuine' mass Fascist party had not taken root in Spanish society, what had germinated and gathered strength was a counter-revolutionary politico-cultural tradition, which, like 'pre-Fascism' in Italy and völkisch nationalism in Germany, was able to be mobilised to play a similar role."; Preston 2005, pp. 14:"The Unification of 1937 and the emasculation and bureaucratization of the radical Falange had their parallel in the fusion of fascists, nationalists and monarchists in 1923. There are fascinating similarities between the social support, ideological objectives and crucial importance to their respective causes of the agrarian Fascists and the agrarian CEDA. Equally, there are valid comparisons to be made between Renovación Espanola and the Italian Nationalist Association, both in their relationships to the more radical, populist Falange and Fascist Party and in the disproportionate role that their theorists were later to play in each of the dictatorships."; Blinkhorn 2003, pp. 81:"The Franco regime... studied here by Paul Preston – is a useful example. Notwithstanding the aforementioned fascisant tendencies within the Spanish Catholic and monarchist right, radical fascism, in the form of the Falange (fused from 1934 with the JONS), was weak until 1936... The product, like the Italian Fascist regime, was a compromise between radical fascism and conservative authoritarianism, in this case, with unambiguous military and Church support."); Antisemitism Factions: Fascism (Falangism) (Note: Blinkhorn 2003, pp. 10–11: "... radical fascism, in the form of the Falange (fused from 1934 with the JONS), was weak until 1936 began to expand rapidly, not least through the recruitment of disillusioned JAP-ists. [...] As Preston indicates, Falangism played a superficially prominent and important role for as long as it suited Franco...: Griffin & Feldman 2004, pp. 82–83; Albanese & Hierro 2016, p. 54: "It was the FET-JONS, the main actor in Spain, which wanted the full fascistization of the country and which was most active during the period in trying to achieve it through the so-called 'syndicalist revolution'. This should not come as a surprise; Falange did not need the fascistization process since it was already fully fascist. Further, relations between Falange and Italy had become stronger since the Spanish Civil War. Mussolini saw the Spanish party as the main vehicle capable of transforming Spain into a fully fascist country. Similarly, FET-jons also regarded Mussolini's Italy as its main reference point. They even asked the authorities in Rome for advice about carrying out the fascistization process of the Francoist regime as effectively as possible."; Thomàs 2020, pp. 38–39: "Al referirnos a fascismo español lo hacemos a dos organizaciones diferentes. En primer lugar al partido fascista Falange Española de las JONS, que existió entre 1934 y el 19 de abril de 1937; y en segundo, al partido único del régimen franquista, Falange Española Tradicionalista y de las JONS, creado el último día citado y subsistente durante toda la vigencia del Franquismo -ni más ni menos que hasta abril de 1977, aunque en 1958 trocó su denominación por la de Movimiento Nacional. Existieron así dos organizaciones fascistas diferentes, aunque la segunda nació en parte de la primera y la integró."); Carlism; Anti-Catalan sentiment; Alfonsism
- Political position: Right-wing to far-right
- Part of: Movimiento Nacional (from 1937)
- Wars: Spanish Civil War: Spanish coup of July 1936

The Nationalist faction (Note: The term "Nationalists" is the most often used in English-language media, while the Spanish term is nacionales 'nationals'. In Spanish-language discussion of the war, nacionalista can be used for Basque and Catalan nationalists, who mostly aligned with the Republican faction. This can lead to confusion when translating from Spanish.) (Spanish: Bando nacional), also called the Rebel faction (Spanish: Bando sublevado) and Francoist faction (Spanish: Bando franquista), was a major faction in the Spanish Civil War of 1936 to 1939. It was composed of a variety of right-wing political groups that supported the Spanish coup of July 1936 against the Second Spanish Republic and Republican faction and sought to depose Manuel Azaña. It included the Falange Española de las JONS, the CEDA ('Spanish Confederation of the Autonomous Right'), and two rival monarchist claimants: the Alfonsist Spanish Renovation and the Carlist Traditionalist Communion. In 1937, the Unification Decree merged all these groups into the FET y de las JONS. In the course of the war, the Nationalist groups, which exhibited certain "fascisant" and "pre-fascist" tendencies, became unified around a new emerging ideological project marked by modern ultranationalism and the goal of purifying and reviving the nation in the "bonfire" of the war to achieve a Spanish "New Man" similarly to Italian Fascism.

After the death of the faction's early leaders, General Francisco Franco, one of the members of the 1936 coup, headed the Nationalists throughout most of the war, and emerged as the dictator of Spain until his death in 1975.

The term Nationalists or Nationals (nacionales) was coined by Joseph Goebbels following the visit of the clandestine Spanish delegation led by Francisco Arranz requesting materiel on 24 July 1936, in order to give a cloak of legitimacy to Nazi Germany's help to the Spanish rebel military. The leaders of the Rebels, who had already been called 'Crusaders' by the Bishop of Salamanca, Enrique Pla y Deniel – and also used the term Cruzada for their campaign – immediately took a liking to it.

The term Bando nacional or Blancos 'Whites' – much as the term rojos 'Reds' to refer to Republican loyalists – is considered by some authors as a term linked to the propaganda of that faction. Throughout the civil war the term 'National' was mainly used by the members and supporters of the rebel faction, while its opponents used the terms fascistas 'fascists' or facciosos 'sectarians'.

== Belligerents ==
The military rebellion found wide areas of support both inside Spain and in the international sphere. In Spain the Francoist side was mainly supported by the predominantly conservative upper class, liberal professionals, religious organizations and land-owning farmers. It was mostly based in the rural areas where progressive political movements had made few inroads, such as great swathes of the Northern Meseta, including almost all of Old Castile, as well as La Rioja, Navarre, Alava, the area near Zaragoza in Aragon, most of Galicia, parts of Cáceres in Extremadura and many dispersed pockets in rural Andalusia where the local society still followed older traditional patterns and was yet comparably untouched by "modern" thought.

The historians Paul Preston and Julián Casanova note that what they describe as Spanish fascism was not centered in a fascist party, but was established by the unity of the right-wing groups and parties and the military rebels, which formed the Nationalist faction. They view the Nationalists as a united movement, where different groups shared the unity of "regiments in the same army." According to them, the Spanish right shared a political culture, similar to the Italian " 'pre-Fascism' like of the Italian Nationalist Association and the German Völkisch movement. In the Civil War, the Spanish right, including the military rebels, underwent further political radicalization and fascisation. As Preston writes, "throughout the Civil War, the politics of the army were indistinguishable from contemporary fascisms."

=== Political groups ===
Politically this faction rallied together various parties and organizations, such as the conservative CEDA, Falangists, Catholics and pro-monarchic movements such as the Agraristas and the Carlistas (among whom were the Requetés).

==== Falange ====
Falange

The Falange Española was originally a Spanish fascist political party founded by José Antonio Primo de Rivera, son of the former Spanish leader Miguel Primo de Rivera. The Falange was created with the financial assistance of Alfonsist monarchist funding. Upon being formed, the Falange was officially anti-clerical and anti-monarchist. As a landowner and aristocrat, Primo de Rivera assured the upper classes that Spanish fascism would not get out of their control like its equivalents in Germany and Italy. In 1934, the Falange merged with the pro-Nazi Juntas de Ofensiva Nacional-Sindicalista of Ramiro Ledesma Ramos, to form the Falange Española de las JONS.

Initially, the Falange was short of funds and was a small student-based movement that preached of a utopian violent nationalist revolution. The Falange committed acts of violence before the war, including becoming involved in street brawls with their political opponents that helped to create a state of lawlessness that the right-wing press blamed on the republic to support a military uprising. Falangist terror squads sought to create an atmosphere of disorder in order to justify the imposition of an authoritarian regime. With the onset of middle-class disillusionment with the CEDA's legalism, support for the Falange expanded rapidly. By September 1936, the total Falangist volunteers numbered at 35,000, accounting for 55 percent of all civilian forces of the Nationals.

Falange Española de las JONS was one of the original supporters of the military coup d'état against the republic, the other being the Carlists. After the death of José Antonio Primo de Rivera, Manuel Hedilla sought to take control of the Falange, but this was usurped by Franco who sought to take control of the movement as part of his move to take control of the National faction. In 1937, Franco announced a decree of unification of the National political movements, particularly the Falange and the Carlists into a single movement, nominally still the Falange, under his leadership, under the name Falange Española Tradicionalista y de las JONS. Both Falangists and Carlists were initially furious at the decision, Falangists in particular saw their ideological role as being usurped by the Catholic Church and their revolution being indefinitely postponed.

Upon unification and seizure of leadership by Franco, Franco distanced the party from fascism and declared "The Falange does not consider itself fascist; its founder said so personally." After this announcement, the practice in the National faction of referring to the Falange as "fascists" disappeared by 1937, but Franco did not deny that there were fascists within the Falange. Franco declared that the Falange's goal was to incorporate the "great neutral mass of the unaffiliated", and promised that no ideological rigidity would be allowed to interfere with the goal. Under Franco's leadership, the Falange abandoned the previous anticlerical tendencies of José Antonio Primo de Rivera and instead promoted neotraditionalist National Catholicism, though it continued to criticize Catholic pacifism. Franco's Falange also abandoned hostility to capitalism, with Falange member Raimundo Fernández-Cuesta declaring that Falange's national syndicalism was fully compatible with capitalism.

==== CEDA ====
CEDA

The Spanish Confederation of Autonomous Right-wing Groups, CEDA, was a Catholic right-wing political organization dedicated to anti-Marxism. The CEDA was led by José María Gil-Robles y Quiñones. The CEDA claimed that it was defending Spain and "Christian civilization" from Marxism, and claimed that the political atmosphere in Spain had made politics a matter of Marxism versus anti-Marxism. With the advent of the rise of the Nazi Party to power in Germany, the CEDA aligned itself with similar propaganda ploys to the Nazis, including the Nazi emphasis on authority, the fatherland, and hierarchy. Gil-Robles attended in audience at the Nazi Party rally in Nuremberg and was influenced by it, henceforth becoming committed to creating a single anti-Marxist counterrevolutionary front in Spain. Gil-Robles declared his intention to "give Spain a true unity, a new spirit, a totalitarian polity..." and went on to say "Democracy is not an end but a means to the conquest of the new state. When the time comes, either parliament submits or we will eliminate it." The CEDA held fascist-style rallies, called Gil-Robles "Jefe", the equivalent of Duce, and claimed that the CEDA might lead a "March on Madrid" to forcefully seize power. The CEDA failed to make the substantive electoral gains from 1931 to 1936 that were needed for it to form government which resulted in right-wing support draining from it and turning towards the belligerent Alfonsist monarchist leader José Calvo Sotelo. Subsequently, the CEDA abandoned its moderation and legalism and began providing support for those committed to violence against the republic, including handing over its electoral funds to the initial leader of the military coup against the republic, General Emilio Mola. Subsequently, supporters of the CEDA's youth movement, Juventudes de Acción Popular (JAP) began to defect en masse to join the Falange, and the JAP ceased to exist as a political organisation in 1937.

==== Monarchists ====
===== Carlists =====
Requetés/CT

The Carlists were monarchists and ardent ultratraditionalist Catholics who sought the installation of Carlist Pretender Francisco Javier de Borbón as King of Spain. The Carlists were anti-republican, anti-democratic and staunchly anti-socialist. The Carlists were so anti-socialist that they opposed both Hitler and Mussolini because of their socialist tendencies. The Carlists were led by Manuel Fal Condé and held their main base of support in Navarre. The Carlists along with the Falange were the original supporters of the military coup d'état against the republic. The Carlists held a long history of violent opposition to Spanish liberalism, dating back to 1833 when they launched a six-year civil war against the reformist regency of María Cristina de las dos Sicilias. The Carlists were strongly intransigent to any coalition with other movements, even believing that no non-Carlist could have honest intentions.

During the war, the Carlists' militia, the Requetés reached a peak of 42,000 recruits but by the end of hostilities in April 1939 their overall strength had been reduced to 23,000. The Carlists contributed some of the Nationalists' most effective shock troops during the war.

===== Alfonsists =====
Renovación Española

The Alfonsists were a movement that supported the restoration of Alfonso XIII of Spain as monarch following the founding of the Spanish Second Republic in 1931. They competed with rival monarchists, the Carlists, for the Spanish throne. After the overthrow of the monarchy of Alfonso XIII, Alfonsist supporters formed the Renovación Española, a monarchist political party, which held considerable economic influence and had close supporters in the Spanish army. Renovación Española did not, however, manage to become a mass political movement. In 1934, the Alfonsists, led by Antonio Goicoechea, along with the Carlists, met with Italian dictator Benito Mussolini to gain support for an uprising against the republic, in which Mussolini promised to provide money and arms for such a rising. From 1934 to 1936, the charismatic Alfonsist leader José Calvo Sotelo spoke of the need for the "conquest of the state" as the only means to secure the establishment of an ideal authoritarian, corporatist state. Sotelo made passionate speeches in support of violent counterrevolution and emphasized the need for a military insurrection against the republic to counter the threats of communism and separatism that he blamed as being caused by the republic. Sotelo was kidnapped and assassinated by political opponents (who were initially searching out Gil-Robles of the CEDA to kidnap) on 13 July 1936 which sparked fury on the political right and helped legitimize the military coup against the republic.

When the war broke out, Infante Juan, the son of Alfonso XIII and heir to the Spanish throne, requested the permission of Franco to take part in the Nationalists' war effort by enlisting as a member of the crew of the cruiser Balaeres, which was nearing completion. He promised to abstain from political activities, but Franco refused, believing that he would become a figurehead for the Alfonsists who held a strong presence in the military.

=== Military ===
==== Army of Africa ====
Flag of the Spanish Moroccan Protectorate

The Army of Africa was a field army garrisoned in Spanish Morocco – a legacy of the Rif War – under the command of General Francisco Franco. It consisted of the Spanish Foreign Legion and the Regulares, infantry and cavalry units recruited from the population of Spanish Morocco and with Spanish officers as commanders.

The Regulares operated as the shock troops of the National forces in exchange for a substantial pay. More than 13,000 Moroccan troops were airlifted on 20 Junkers Ju 52 planes supplied by Hitler between the beginning of the conflict in July and October 1936. Their proverbial cruelty and reckless behaviour were not random, but were part of a calculated plan of the Francoist military leaders in order to instill terror in the Republican defence lines.

The Army of Africa would be the most decorated unit in the May 1939 victory brigade by the Nationalists; it has been estimated that one in five of its members were killed during the war, a casualty rate twice as high as that of the peninsular forces within the Spanish Nationalist faction. For several years after the war, Franco would have a squadron of Moorish troops act as his escort at public ceremonies as a reminder of the Army's importance in the Nationalist victory.

==== Civil Guard ====
Approximately 47% of the Spanish Republican Civil Guard defected to the rebels during the onset of the civil war. With the highest authority of the Spanish Republican Civil Guard, Inspector General Sebastián Pozas, remaining loyal to the republican government, the rebel units of the Civil Guard were placed under direct command of the Nationalist army until after the war ended.

==== Other military forces ====
- Aviación Nacional
- Spanish Navy (rebel factions)

== Foreign support ==
=== Italy ===
Kingdom of Italy

Italy under the Fascist leadership of Benito Mussolini supported the overthrow of the republic and the establishment of a regime that would serve as a client state to Italy. Italy distrusted the Spanish Republic due to its pro-French leanings and prior to the war had made contact with Spanish right-wing groups. Italy justified its intervention as an action intended to prevent the rise of Bolshevism in Spain. Italy's Fascist regime considered the threat of Bolshevism a real risk with the arrival of volunteers from the Soviet Union who were fighting for the Republicans. Mussolini provided financial support as well as training to the Alfonsists, Carlists, and Falange. Mussolini met Falangist leader José Antonio Primo de Rivera in 1933 but did not have much enthusiasm in the establishment of fascism in Spain at that time.

By January 1937, an expeditionary force of 35,000 Italians, the Corpo Truppe Volontarie, were in Spain under the command of General Mario Roatta. The contingent was made up of four divisions: Littorio, Dio lo Vuole ("God Wills it"), Fiamme Nere ("Black Flames") and Penne Nere ("Black Feathers"). The first of these divisions was made up of soldiers; the other three of Blackshirt volunteers. Italy provided the National forces with fighter and bomber aircraft which played a significant part in the war. In March 1937, Italy intervened in the political affairs of the Nationals by sending Roberto Farinacci to Spain to urge Franco to unite the various political movements of the Nationalist faction into one fascist "Spanish National Party".

=== Germany ===
German Reich

Germany provided the Nationals with material, specialists, and a powerful air force contingent, the Condor Legion German expeditionary forces that provided airlift of soldiers and material from Spanish Africa to Peninsular Spain and provided offensive operations against Republican forces. Nationalist forces were supplied with tanks and aircraft, including the Panzer I, Messerschmitt Bf 109 and Heinkel He 111. The Spanish Civil War would provide an ideal testing ground for the proficiency of the new weapons produced during the German re-armament. Many aeronautical bombing techniques were tested by the Condor Legion against the Republican Government on Spanish soil with the permission of Generalísimo Franco. Hitler insisted, however, that his long-term designs were peaceful, a strategy labelled as "Blumenkrieg" (Flower War).

Germany had important economic interests at stake in Spain, as Germany imported large amounts of mineral ore from Spanish Morocco. The Nazi regime sent retired General Wilhelm Faupel as ambassador to Franco's regime, Faupel supported Franco and the Falange in the hope that they would create a Nazi-like regime in Spain. Debt owed by Franco and the Nationals to Germany rose quickly upon purchasing German material, and required financial assistance from Germany as the Republicans had access to Spain's gold reserve.

=== Portugal ===
Portuguese Republic

Upon the outbreak of the civil war, Portuguese Prime Minister António de Oliveira Salazar almost immediately supported the National forces. Salazar's Estado Novo regime held tense relations with the Spanish Republic that held Portuguese dissidents to his regime in it. Portugal played a critical role in supplying Franco's forces with ammunition and many other logistical resources. Despite its discreet direct military involvement – restrained to a somewhat "semi-official" endorsement, by its authoritarian regime, of an 8,000–12,000-strong volunteer force, the so-called "Viriatos" – for the whole duration of the conflict, Portugal was instrumental in providing the National faction with a vital logistical organization and by reassuring Franco and his allies that no interference whatsoever would hinder the supply traffic directed to the Nationals, crossing the borders of the two Iberian countries – the Nationals used to refer to Lisbon as "the port of Castile". In 1938, with Franco's victory increasingly certain, Portugal recognized Franco's regime and after the war in 1939 signed a treaty of friendship and non-aggression pact that was known as the Iberian Pact. Portugal played an important diplomatic role in supporting the Franco regime, including by insisting to the United Kingdom that Franco sought to replicate Salazar's Estado Novo and not Mussolini's Fascist Italy.

=== Holy See ===
Holy See

Among many influential Catholics in Spain, mainly composed of conservative traditionalists and people belonging to pro-monarchic groups, the religious persecution was squarely, and based on evidence probably rightly, mostly blamed on the government of the Republic. The ensuing outrage was used after the 1936 coup by the nationalist/monarchist faction and readily extended itself. The Catholic Church took the side of the rebel government, and hailed the religious Spaniards who had been persecuted in Republican areas as 'martyrs of the faith'. The devout Catholics who supported the Spanish Republic included high-ranking officers of the Popular Army such as republican Catholic general Vicente Rojo Lluch, as well as the Catholic Basque nationalists who opposed the rebel faction.

Initially the Vatican held itself from declaring too openly its support of the rebel side in the war, although it had long allowed high ecclesiastical figures in Spain to do so and to define the conflict as a 'Crusade'. Throughout the war, however, Francoist propaganda and influential Spanish Catholics labelled the secular Republic as "the enemy of God and the Church" and denounced the Republic, holding it responsible for anti-clerical activities such as shutting down Catholic schools and the desecration of religious buildings, as well as the killing of priests and nuns by frenzied mobs.

Forsaken by the Western European powers, the republican side mainly depended on Soviet military assistance; this played into the hands of the portrayal in Francoist propaganda of the Spanish Republic as a 'Marxist' and godless state. By means of its extensive diplomatic network, the Holy See used its influence to lobby for the rebel side. During an International Art Exhibition in Paris in 1937, in which both the Francoist and the Republican governments were present, the Holy See allowed the Nationalist pavilion to display its exhibition under the Vatican flag, for the rebel government's flag was still not recognized. The Holy See was one of the first states to officially recognize Franco's Spanish State, having done so by 1938.

Regarding the position of the Holy See during and after the Civil War, Manuel Montero, lecturer of the University of the Basque Country commented on 6 May 2007:

The Church, which upheld the idea of a 'National Crusade' in order to legitimize the military rebellion, was a belligerent part during the Civil War, even at the cost of alienating part of its members. It continues in a belligerent role in its unusual answer to the Historical Memory Law by recurring to the beatification of 498 "martyrs" of the Civil War. The priests executed by Franco's Army are not counted among them. It continues to be a Church that is incapable of transcending its one-sided behaviour of 70 years ago and amenable to the fact that this past should always haunt us. In this political use of granting religious recognition one can perceive its indignation regarding the compensations to the victims of Francoism. Its selective criteria regarding the religious persons that were part of its ranks are difficult to fathom. The priests who were victims of the republicans are "martyrs who died forgiving", but those priests who were executed by the Francoists are forgotten.

=== Other supporters ===
1,000–2,000 English, Irish, French, Filipino, White Russians, Polish, Romanian, Hungarian, and Belgian volunteers came to Spain to fight on the side of the Nationals. Only two British women Priscilla Scott-Ellis and Gabriel Herbert volunteered as nurses.

== See also ==
- Republican faction (Spanish Civil War)
- Spanish Republican Armed Forces
