= Enrico Francisci =

Italian general (1884–1943)

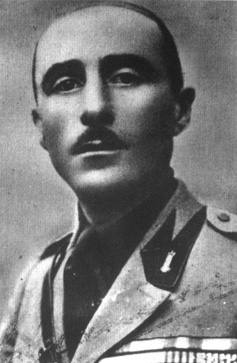
- Born: 1884; Montemurlo, Kingdom of Italy
- Died: 11 July 1943 (aged 58–59); Campobello di Licata, Kingdom of Italy
- Military career
- Allegiance: Kingdom of Italy
- Branch: Royal Italian Army; MVSN
- Rank: Major General
- Commands: 62nd Blackshirt Legion "Isonzo"; 90th Blackshirt Legion "Pisa"; 135th Blackshirt Legion "Indomita" "23 Marzo" Blackshirt Group; Raggruppamento CC. NN. "23 Marzo"
- Conflicts: Italo-Turkish War; World War I; Second Italo-Ethiopian War; Battle of Amba Aradam; Spanish Civil War; Battle of Guadalajara; Battle of Santander; World War II; Italian campaign on the Eastern Front; Allied invasion of Sicily
- Awards: Gold Medal of Military Valour (posthumous); Silver Medal of Military Valour (twice); Bronze Medal of Military Valour (three times); War Cross for Military Valor (three times); War Merit Cross

Enrico Francisci (1884 – 11 July 1943) was an Italian Blackshirt general during World War II.

== Biography ==
Born in Montemurlo in 1884, Francisci pursued a military career in the Royal Italian Army; he fought in Libya during the Italo-Turkish War with the rank of second lieutenant in 83rd Infantry Regiment "Venezia", and then participated in the First World War, earning a Silver Medal of Military Valour, three Bronze Medals of Military Valour, three War Crosses for Military Valor and a War Merit Cross. By the end of the war he had reached the rank of major.

After promotion to lieutenant colonel he was attached to the Governorate of Libya; he joined Fascism in 1920 and after the march on Rome he passed from the Royal Army to the Voluntary Militia for National Security with the rank of console (colonel), holding command of the 62nd Blackshirt Legion "Isonzo" in Gorizia and then of the 90th Legion in Pisa.

During the Second Italo-Ethiopian War he commanded the 135th Blackshirt Legion "Indomita" of the 1st Blackshirt Division 23 Marzo, and was awarded another Silver Medal for Military Valor for his role in the battle of Amba Aradam.

After promotion to console generale (brigadier general), he participated in the Spanish Civil War in the ranks of the Corpo Truppe Volontarie, commanding the "23 Marzo" Blackshirt Group, and in September 1937 he fought in the Battle of Santander and was promoted to luogotenente generale (major general) for war merits.

He left active service in 1939, due to age limits, but returned to the MVSN after the outbreak of the Second World War; in July 1942 he was given command of the Raggruppamento CC. NN. "23 Marzo", consisting of six Blackshirt battalions, attached to the 8th Army deployed on the Eastern Front. In September 1942 his troops repelled a Soviet attack on the Don River, and in November Francisci was wounded and repatriated. He was then appointed Inspector General of the MVSN of the Armed Forces Command of Sicily.

On 10 July 1943, after the Allied landings in Sicily, Francisci was tasked by General Alfredo Guzzoni, commander of the 6th Army, with coordinating the counterattack against the American force that had landed in Licata. At dawn on 11 July, Francisci led a counterattack launched by the 177th Bersaglieri Regiment and the 161st Self-propelled Artillery Group; during the fighting, while standing on a self-propelled gun, he was decapitated by a tank shell near Favarotta. He was posthumously awarded the Gold Medal of Military Valour, and is buried in Enna.
