= General Bertie =

General Bertie may refer to:

- Albemarle Bertie, 9th Earl of Lindsey (1744–1818), British Army lieutenant general
- Peregrine Bertie, 3rd Duke of Ancaster and Kesteven (1714–1778), British Army general
- Lord Robert Bertie (1721–1782), British Army general

== See also ==
- Mario Berti (1881–1964), Royal Italian Army lieutenant general
