= Costantino Salvi =

Italian general

- Born: 26 April 1886; Ravenna, Kingdom of Italy
- Died: 14 January 1945 (aged 58); Flossenbürg, Nazi Germany
- Military career
- Allegiance: Kingdom of Italy
- Branch: Royal Italian Army
- Service years: 1907–1943
- Rank: Brigadier General
- Commands: 43rd Infantry Regiment "Forli"; 2nd Banderas Group; 1st Coastal Brigade; 201st Coastal Division; Cuneo Military Zone
- Conflicts: Italo-Turkish War; Battle of Ain Zara; Battle of Sidi Bilal; World War I; Battles of the Isonzo; Spanish Civil War; Battle of Malaga; Battle of Guadalajara; World War II
- Awards: Silver Medal of Military Valor (three times); Bronze Medal of Military Valor; War Cross for Military Valor; Order of the Crown of Italy

Costantino Salvi (28 April 1886 – 14 January 1945) was an Italian general during World War II.

== Biography ==
He was born in Ravenna on April 28, 1886. After attending the Royal Military Academy of Infantry and Cavalry in Modena he graduated with the rank of infantry second lieutenant, on September 5, 1907, entering in service in the 82nd Infantry Regiment "Roma". In 1911-1912 he took part in the Italian-Turkish War and distinguished himself in the battle of Ain Zara and in the battle of Sidi Bilal, for which he was awarded a silver medal for military valor. He participated in the Great War as a lieutenant and then captain, earning a Bronze Medal of Military Valor on June 24, 1915, a second silver medal on July 6, 1915, near Redipuglia, and a War Cross for Military Valor. After being promoted to major on 28 June 1917, he was transferred to the 39th Infantry Regiment "Bologna".

From 24 March 1922 he was assigned to the 51st Infantry Regiment "Alpi", being placed on sick leave from the following 24 June until 12 December, and then, from 23 November 1924, to the 152nd Infantry Regiment "Sassari" in Trieste. On 8 October 1925 he was awarded the Cross of Officer of the Order of the Crown of Italy on the proposal of the Ministry of Foreign Affairs. After promotion to lieutenant colonel on 9 July 1926, on 1 December 1928 he was transferred to the 89th Infantry Regiment "Salerno". Having become colonel on 5 September 1934, he was commander of the 43rd Infantry Regiment "Forli" from 1 October of the same year. In 1937 he volunteered for the Spanish Civil War, where he commanded the 2nd "Banderas" Group, a mixed Italian-Spanish unit, part of the 1st CC.NN. Division "Dio lo Vuole". He distinguished himself during the Battle of Malaga and the Battle of Guadalajara, being decorated with a third silver medal for Military Valor.

In 1939 he was transferred to the Army Corps of Alessandria and then to that of Genoa, where he also served at the local territorial defense command. After promotion to brigadier general on 1 January 1940, he remained with this body, for special assignments, until 24 September 1941. On the 25th of the same month he was assigned to service to the XV Corps, headquartered in Genoa, and given command of the 1st Coastal Brigade in Savona. On 1 November 1942, when the Brigade was enlarged and reorganized as the 201st Coastal Division, he became commander of the new Division until 26 July 1943, when he was removed from his post after refusing to order his troops to fire on the crowd that was celebrating the fall of the Fascist regime in Savona. On 11 August 1943 he was given command of the military zone of Cuneo. After the signing of the armistice of Cassibile on 8 September 1943, Salvi did not oppose the German takeover (Cuneo was captured without opposition by SS units of the Leibstandarte Adolf Hitler led by Joachim Peiper), and was appointed governor of Cuneo; in this capacity he helped disbanded soldiers to return home and provided aid to the survivors of the Boves massacre, until he was dismissed from his post on 23 October 1943. He started collaborating with the Piedmontese Resistance, until he was arrested by the German police in Cuneo in 1944. On 5 September 1944 he was sent to Flossenbürg concentration camp with Transport 81, and died in a sub-camp of Flossenbürg on 17 January 1945.
