= 201st Coastal Division =

Royal Italian Army infantry division during World War II

- Active: 1942 – 1943
- Country: Kingdom of Italy
- Branch: Royal Italian Army
- Size: Division
- Garrison/HQ: Savona
- Engagements: World War II

Insignia
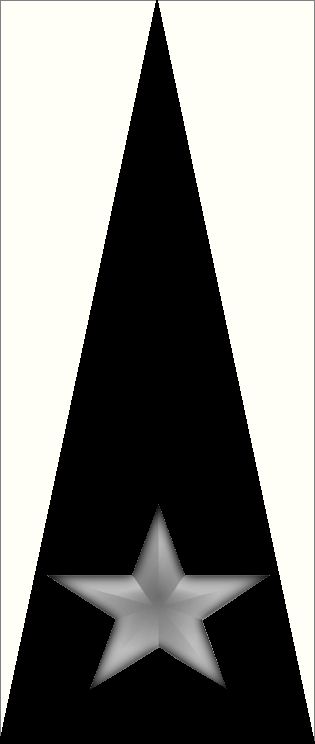
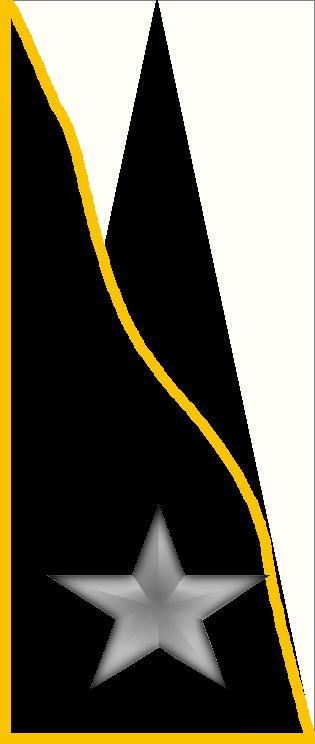
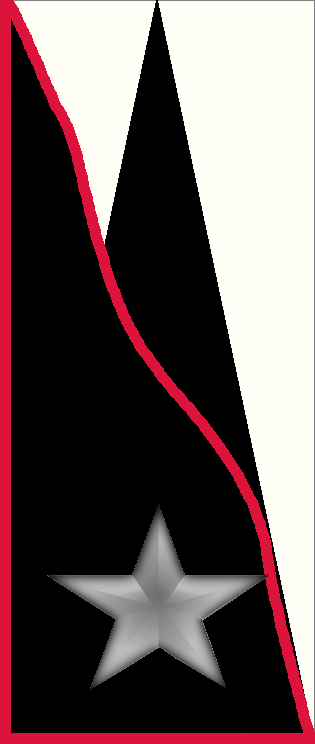
- Identification symbol: 201st Coastal Division gorget patches

The 201st Coastal Division (Italian: 201ª Divisione Costiera) was an infantry division of the Royal Italian Army during World War II. Royal Italian Army coastal divisions were second line divisions formed with reservists and equipped with second rate materiel. Recruited locally, they were often commanded by officers called out of retirement.

== History ==
The division was activated on 1 November 1942 in Genoa by expanding the I Coastal Brigade. The division was assigned to XV Army Corps and in December 1942 moved to Savona. The division was responsible for the coastal defense of the coast of Liguria between Menton in occupied France and Punta del Mesco near La Spezia. In January 1943 the division moved its headquarter to Menton.

After the announcement of the Armistice of Cassibile on 8 September 1943 the division was disbanded by invading German forces.

== Organization ==
- 201st Coastal Division, in Savona
  - Harbor Defense Command Genoa, in Genoa
    - 102nd Coastal Regiment
  - 5th Coastal Regiment
    - CCV Coastal Battalion
    - CCCXXIV Coastal Battalion
    - CDLXXXI Coastal Battalion
    - XV Machine Gun Battalion
    - CXI Machine Gun Battalion
  - 131st Coastal Regiment
    - X Dismounted Squadrons Group "Lancieri Vittorio Emanuele II"
    - XXI Coastal Battalion
    - CCVI Coastal Battalion
    - CDLXXXII Coastal Battalion
  - 5th Coastal Artillery Regiment
    - V Coastal Artillery Group (1 × battery 105/28 cannons and 1 × battery 149/35 heavy guns)
    - VI Coastal Artillery Group (1 × battery 105/28 cannons and 1 × battery 149/35 heavy guns; detached to Harbor Defense Command Genoa)
    - CXXV Coastal Artillery Group (3 × batteries 105/15 howitzers)
    - CXXXII Coastal Artillery Group (1 × battery 75/17 cannons and 2 × batteries 105/15 howitzers)
  - 52nd Anti-paratroopers Unit
  - 53rd Anti-paratroopers Unit
  - 54th Anti-paratroopers Unit
  - 201st Carabinieri Section
  - 1 × Field Post Office
  - Divisional Services

Attached to the division:

- 1st Army Artillery Grouping (from 4 December 1942)
  - I Group (3 × batteries 149/35 heavy guns)
  - II Group (3 × batteries 149/35 heavy guns)
- 7th Army Artillery Grouping (from 15 November 1942)
  - IX Group (3 × batteries 149/35 heavy guns)
  - X Group (3 × batteries 149/35 heavy guns)
  - XI Group (3 × batteries 149/35 heavy guns)
  - XII Group (3 × batteries 149/35 heavy guns)
- Marimobil, in Genoa (Royal Italian Navy)
  - Armored Train 120/2/S, in Vado Ligure (4 × 120/45 Mod. 1918 naval guns, 4 × 20/77 Scotti anti-aircraft guns)
  - Armored Train 152/4/T, in Albisola Superiore (4 × 152/40 naval guns, 4 × 20/77 anti-aircraft guns)
  - Armored Train 152/5/S, in Voltri (4 × 152/40 naval guns, 4 × 20/77 anti-aircraft guns)
  - Armored Train 76/1/S, in Sampierdarena (6 × 76/40 mod. 16 naval guns, 4 × 20/77 anti-aircraft guns)

== Commanding officers ==
The division's commanding officers were:

- Generale di Brigata Costantino Salvi (1 November 1942 - 1943)
- Generale di Divisione Enrico Gazzale (1943 - 8 September 1943)
