= Division XXIII di Marzo =

The Agrupación XXIII de Marzo was upgraded to Division status as the Division XXIII Marzo prior to the Battle of Santander. It was one of the Italian Blackshirts units sent to Spain during the Spanish Civil War to make up the "Corpo Truppe Volontarie" (Corps of Volunteer Troops), or CTV. Was strengthened after the end of the War in the North for the Aragon Offensive in 1938 with 2nd CCNN Division "Fiamme Nere" and renamed XXIII Marzo Division "Fiamme Nere" (Black Flames in Italian).

== Order of battle ==
=== Battle of Santander, August 1937 ===
Division XXIII di Marzo

- 4th Infantry Regiment
  - Battalion Bufalo
  - Battalion Vampa
  - Battalion Toro
  - 5th Battery 65/17
  - 4th Mortar platoon
- 5th Infantry Regiment
  - 540th Battalion Lupi
  - Battalion Ardente
  - Battalion Inesorabile
  - 6th Battery 65/17
  - 5th Mortar platoon
- Division Artillery
  - Grupo de 65/17 (motorized)
- Mixed Engineer Company
- Logistics Section
- Carabinieri Section
- Mixed Motor Transport Company

=== Aragon offensive, 1938 ===
- Commander: Luigi Frusci
- IV Grupo de banderas
  - Battalion Bufalo
  - Battalion Vampa
  - Battalion Toro
  - Battery of 65/17
- V Grupo de banderas
  - Battalion Inessorabile
  - Battalion Ardente
  - Battalion Lupi
  - Battery of 65/17
- VII Grupo de banderas
  - Battalion Implacabile
  - Battalion Inflessibile
  - Battalion Disperata
  - Battery of 65/17
- Division Artillery
  - IIº Grupo de 75/27
  - Grupo de 75/27
  - Grupo de 100/17
  - Grupo de 20mm AA
  - Grupo de 37mm CC
- Engineer Company
- Logistics Section
- Carabinieri Section
- Sanitation Section
- Truck Company

== Sources ==
- de Mesa, José Luis, El regreso de las legiones: (la ayuda militar italiana a la España nacional, 1936–1939), García Hispán, Granada:España, 1994 ISBN 84-87690-33-5

== See also ==
- 1st Blackshirt Division (23 March)
