= 3rd CC.NN. Division "Penne Nere" =

- Active: January 1937 – April 1937
- Country: Kingdom of Italy
- Branch: Blackshirts
- Size: Division
- Part of: Corpo Truppe Volontarie
- Nickname: "Penne Nere" (English: "Black Feathers")
- Engagements: Spanish Civil War: Battle of Guadalajara

Commanders
- Notable commanders: Brigadier General Luigi Nuvoloni

3rd CC.NN. Division "Penne Nere", ("Black Feathers"), was one of the three Blackshirt divisions (Camicie Nere, or CC.NN.) sent to Spain during the Spanish Civil War to make up the "Corpo Truppe Volontarie" (Corps of Volunteer Troops), or CTV. After the Battle of Guadalajara, the division was disbanded and merged into the 2nd CC.NN. Division "Fiamme Nere".

== Structure ==
3rd CC.NN. Division "Penne Nere" - Bgd. Gen. Luigi Nuvoloni

- 9th Group of Banderas - Console Mario Pittau.
  - ? Bandera - ?
  - ? Bandera - ?
  - ? Bandera - ?
  - Support Battery 65/17
  - Engineers Section
- 10th Group of Banderas - Console Generale Giovanni Martini
  - 824 Bandera "Tembien" - 1st Seniore Francesco Grosso
  - 835 Bandera "Scire" - Seniore Luigi Falzone
  - 840 Bandera "Carso" - Seniore Gaetano Spallone
  - Support Battery 65/17
  - Engineers Section
- 11th Grupo de Banderas - Console Generale Alberto Liuzzi
  - 830 Bandera - ?
  - 851 Bandera "Vampa" - Seniore Giuseppe Busalacchi
  - 635 Bandera "Freccia" - ?
  - Support Battery 65/17
  - Engineers Section
- "Carabinieri" Section
- Intendencia Section
- Sanitation Section
- Division Truck Unit

The CC.NN. Divisions contained regular soldiers and volunteer militia from the National Fascist Party. The CC.NN. divisions were semi-motorised.
