= 1st CC.NN. Division "Dio lo Vuole" =

- Active: February 1937 – April 1937
- Country: Kingdom of Italy
- Branch: Blackshirts
- Size: Division
- Part of: Corpo Truppe Volontarie
- Motto: Dio lo Vuole (English: God wills it)
- Engagements: Spanish Civil War: Battle of Guadalajara

Commanders
- Notable commanders: Brigadier General Edmondo Rossi

The 1st CC.NN. Division "Dio lo Vuole" ("God wills it"), was one of the three Italian Blackshirts Divisions sent to Spain during the Spanish Civil War to make up the "Corpo Truppe Volontarie" (Corps of Volunteer Troops), or CTV.

After the Battle of Guadalajara, the Division was disbanded and its personnel were transferred to the 2nd Division "Fiamme Nere" and the XXIII de Marzo Group.

== Structure ==
1st CC.NN. Division "Dio lo vuole" – Bgd. Gen. Edmondo Rossi

- 1st Group of Banderas – Lt. Coronel Aristide Frezza.
  - 533 Bandera "Aquila"
  - ? Bandera "Leone"
  - 524 Bandera "Carroccio" – Mayor Luigi Giulani
  - Support Battery 65/17
  - Engineers Section
- 2nd Group of Banderas – Colonel Costantino Salvi
  - 235 Bandera "Indomita" – Seniore Alberto Montanardi
  - Bandera "Folgore" – 1st Seniore Michele Olivas
  - Bandera "Falco" – Seniore Arnaldo Rocchi
  - Support Battery 65/17 "Centauro"
  - Engineers Section
- 3rd Grupo de Banderas – Coronel Mario Mazza.
  - 640 bis Bandera "Lupi"
  - 524 Bandera "Uragano"
  - 635 Bandera "Tempesta"
  - Support Battery 65/17
  - Engineers Section
- "Carabinieri" Section
- Intendencia Section
- Sanitation Section
- Truck Unit

The Blackshirt (Camicie Nere, or CC.NN.) Divisions contained regular soldiers and volunteer militia from the National Fascist Party. The CC.NN. divisions were semi-motorised.

== Sources ==
- de Mesa, José Luis, El regreso de las legiones: (la ayuda militar italiana a la España nacional, 1936–1939), García Hispán, Granada:España, 1994 ISBN 84-87690-33-5
