= XXIII de Marzo Group =

Unit taking part in the Spanish Civil War

The XXIII de Marzo Group (Spanish: Agrupación XXIII de Marzo) was one of the Blackshirt units sent to Spain during the Spanish Civil War to make up the "Corpo Truppe Volontarie" (Corps of Volunteer Troops), or CTV. This unit was attached to the 2nd CCNN Division "Fiamme Nere" during the Battle of Guadalajara in March 1937. Following defeat there, it was sent to Vizcaya in April 1937 with the Flechas Negras Mixed Brigade and 11 Groups of CTV Corps Artillery.

== Battle of Guadalajara March 1937 ==
Independent Group "XXIII March" - Console Enrico Francisci

- 4th Grupo de Banderas - Console Francesco Gidoni
  - Bandera "Toro" - 1st Seniore Mario Bertoni
  - Bandera "Bisonte" - 1st Seniore Fiorentini
  - Bandera "Bufalo" - 1st Seniore Piero Bologna
  - Battery (65/17)
  - Engineer Section
- 5th Grupo de Banderas - Console Enrico Francisci
  - 540 Bandera "Lupi" - Seniore Nello Brogi
  - 530 Bandera "Implacabile" - Seniore Di Puccio
  - Bandera "Ardente" - 1st Seniore Spangaro
  - Battery (65/17)
  - Engineer Section

== Vizcaya April 1937 ==
Agrupación XXIII de Marzo - Console Enrico Francisci

- 11th Battery (65/17)
- IV Grupo de banderas
  - Bandera "Bufalo"
  - Bandera "Bisonte"
  - Bandera "Toro"
  - 508 Battery (65/17)
  - Mortar Platoon
- V Grupo de banderas
  - 530 Bandera "Implacabile"
  - Bandera "Ardente"
  - 540 Bandera "Lupi"
  - 608 Battery (65/17)
  - Mortar Platoon
- Carabinieri Platoon
- Bandera de complemento

The Blackshirt (Camicie Nere, or CCNN) Divisions contained regular soldiers and volunteer militia from the Fascist Party.

== See also ==
- Division XXIII di Marzo

== Sources ==
- De Mesa, José Luis (1994). El regreso de las legiones: (la ayuda militar italiana a la España nacional, 1936–1939). Granada: García Hispán. ISBN 84-87690-33-5.
