= Moschettieri del Duce =

Honour guard of Italian dictator Benito Mussolini

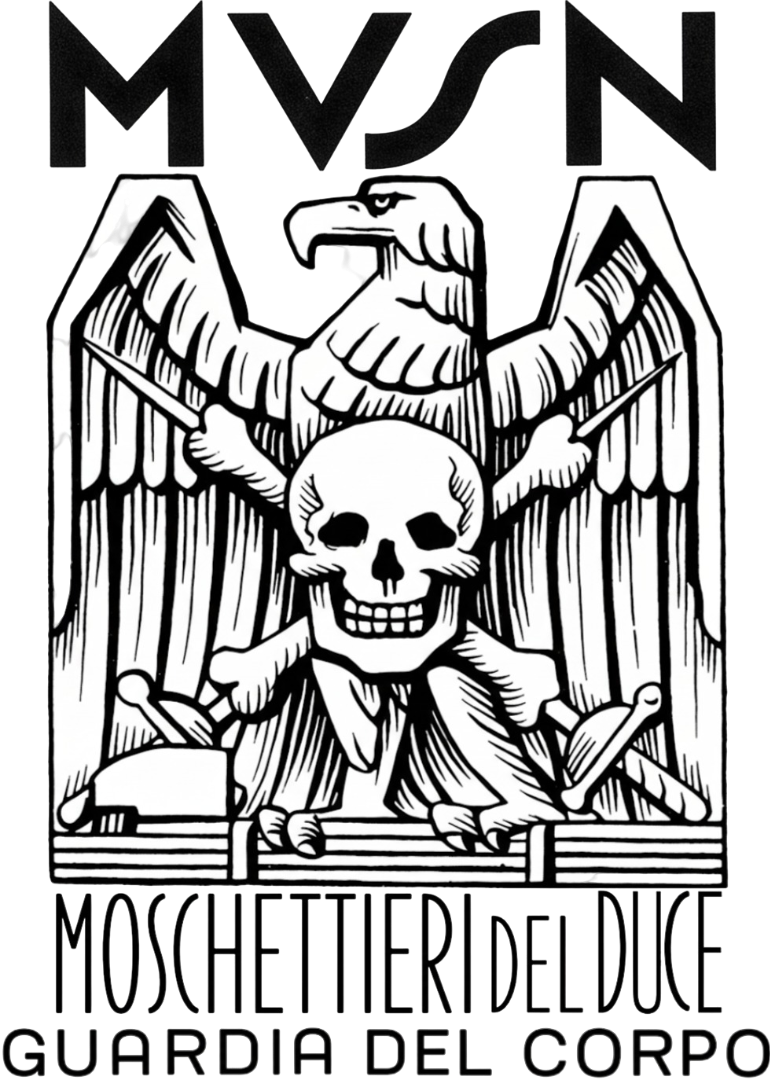
- Institutional emblem of the Moschettieri del Duce

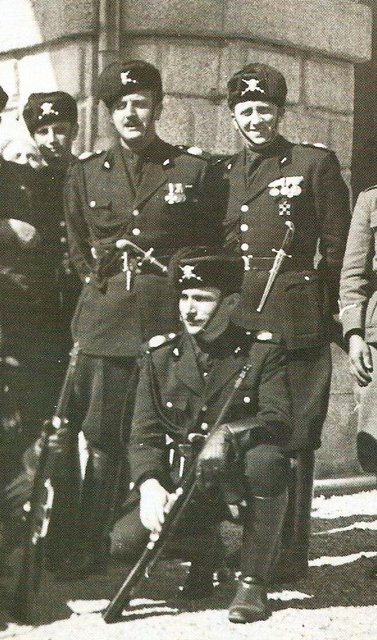
Members of the Moschettieri del Duce

The Moschettieri del Duce ("Musketeers of the Duce") were an elite unit of the Volunteer Militia for National Security (MVSN; Blackshirts), who served as Benito Mussolini's honor guard at Palazzo Venezia and during

military parades and Fascist ceremonies, similar to what the Corazzieri were to the King. They also provided internal security during the meetings of the Grand Council of Fascism.

The corps was established on 11 February 1923; its members were chosen among the most loyal members of the MVSN and numbered 180, organized into squads of five men. Stationed in Rome, the unit was directly subordinated to the command-in-chief of the MVSN. A basic requirement to enlist in the Moschettieri was to have completed the compulsory military service as Royal Army officers; service was voluntary and its members did not receive any pay.

The Moschettieri del Duce were formally dissolved in 1940, when many of its members departed for the front after Italy's entry into World War II, but de facto continued to exist until the fall of the Fascist regime on 25 July 1943. Its last commander, from September 1936 to July 1943, was centurione (Captain), later seniore (Major), Mario D'Havet.

== List of Commanders ==
Very little documentation about the Moschettieri del Duce is easily accessible, but this is what is easy enough to find.

			Term of Office		
No.	Portait	Name (Birth - Death)	Took Office	Left Office	Ref.
1	N/A	Gino Calza Bini (14 December 1883 - 1946)	c. 1923	c. 1936	
2	Mario d'Havet, prior to joining the Moschettieri del Duce c.1924	Mario d'Havet (13 July 1904 - Unknown)	September 1936	July 1943	

== Ranks ==
These are the only known ranks used within the Moschettieri del Duce. Officer's uniforms can be found with insignia, though uniforms of lower ranking members cannot be found with insignia, so it is possible that these did not feature any form of rank identification.

Title	MVSN Rank Equivalent	Rank Insignia
Comandante dei Moschettieri	Seniore	
Primo Moschettiere	Centurione	
Moschettiere Scelto	Capo Squadra	
Moschettiere	Legionario	No Insignia

== Uniforms ==
The Moschettieri del Duce wore very similar uniforms to those of the rest of the Brigate Neri. They featured a black tunic and trousers with high boots, a black fez featuring the Moschettieri skull emblem, and sometimes black leather gloves for ceremonial purposes.
