= Tank and Armoured Cars Group =

The Tank and Armoured Cars Group (Agrupación de carros de asalto y autos blindados in Spanish) was the first armoured formation of the Corps of Volunteer Troops (Corpo Truppe Volontarie, or CTV) involved in the Spanish Civil War. Between 3 February and 8 February 1937, Italian armour played a successful part during the Battle of Málaga. But, between 8 March and 23 March 1937, this group was involved in the Battle of Guadalajara which turned out to be a Republican victory.

== Order of battle March 1937 ==
- Tank and Armoured Cars Group - Colonel Carlo Rivolta
  - 1st Tank Company - Capitán Oreste Fortuna
  - 2nd Tank Company - Capitán Paolo Paladini
  - 3rd Tank Company - Capitán Miduri
  - 4th Tank Company - Capitán Carcio
  - 1st Armoured Car Company
  - 1st Motorized Machinegunners Company - Capitán Ricci
  - 47mm Anti-tank Gun Section
  - Chemical-Flamethrower Company

== Order of battle fall 1938 ==
- Tankers Grouping - Colonel Roberto Olmi
  - Command Company
  - Assault Tanks Regiment
    - 3× Tank battalions (2× Italian, 1× Spanish; each battalion fielded two tank companies with L3/35 tankettes)
  - 1x Motorized-Mechanized Battalion (1× Bersaglieri company, 1× motorcyclist-machinegunners Company, 1× armoured cars company)
  - 1× Arditi battalion (reinforced with 1× machinegunners company)
  - 1× Mixed Group (1× battery with 65/17 mod. 13 mountain guns, 2× batteries with 47/32 anti-tank guns, 1× anti-aircraft battery)
  - 1× L3/35 Lf Flamethrower Company

== See also ==
- L3/35
- Cannone da 47/32 M35

== Sources ==
- de Mesa, José Luis, El regreso de las legiones: la ayuda militar italiana a la España nacional, 1936-1939, García Hispán, Granada:España, 1994 ISBN 84-87690-33-5 (in Spanish)
