= XV Army Corps (Italy) =

The XV Army Corps (Italian: XV Corpo d'Armata) was a corps of the Royal Italian Army between 1939 and 1943.

== History ==
the XV Army Corps was created in Genoa on 25 March 1939.

In June 1940, it took part in the Italian invasion of France on the Southern part of the front. It reached Menton, Breil-sur-Roya, and Monte Grammondo. After the armistice with France, the XV Army Corps was in charge of the defense of the Ligurian coast, from the French border to Savona.
After the landings of the Allies in French North Africa, XV Corps participated in Case Anton and on 11 November 1942, it entered French territory again. It occupied Nice, Grasse, Cannes, Antibes, St. Raphael and Toulon. On 20 December 1942, XV Corps returned to Italy to again take up the coastal defense of Liguria.
It remained here until September 1943, when it was disarmed by the Germans and dissolved after the Armistice of Cassibile.

== Composition (1940) ==
- 5th Infantry Division "Cosseria"
- 44th Infantry Division "Cremona"
- 37th Infantry Division "Modena"

== Composition (1943) ==
- 6th Alpine Division "Alpi Graie"
- 103rd Infantry Division "Piacenza"
- 105th Infantry Division "Rovigo"
- 201st Coastal Division

== Commanders ==
- Mario Berti (1939.03.15 – 1940.06.05)
- Gastone Gambara (1940.06.06 – 1941.01.01)
- Emilio Bancale (1941.01.01 – 1943.09.08)
