= Mario Berti =

Italian officer during World War I, the Spanish Civil War, and World War II

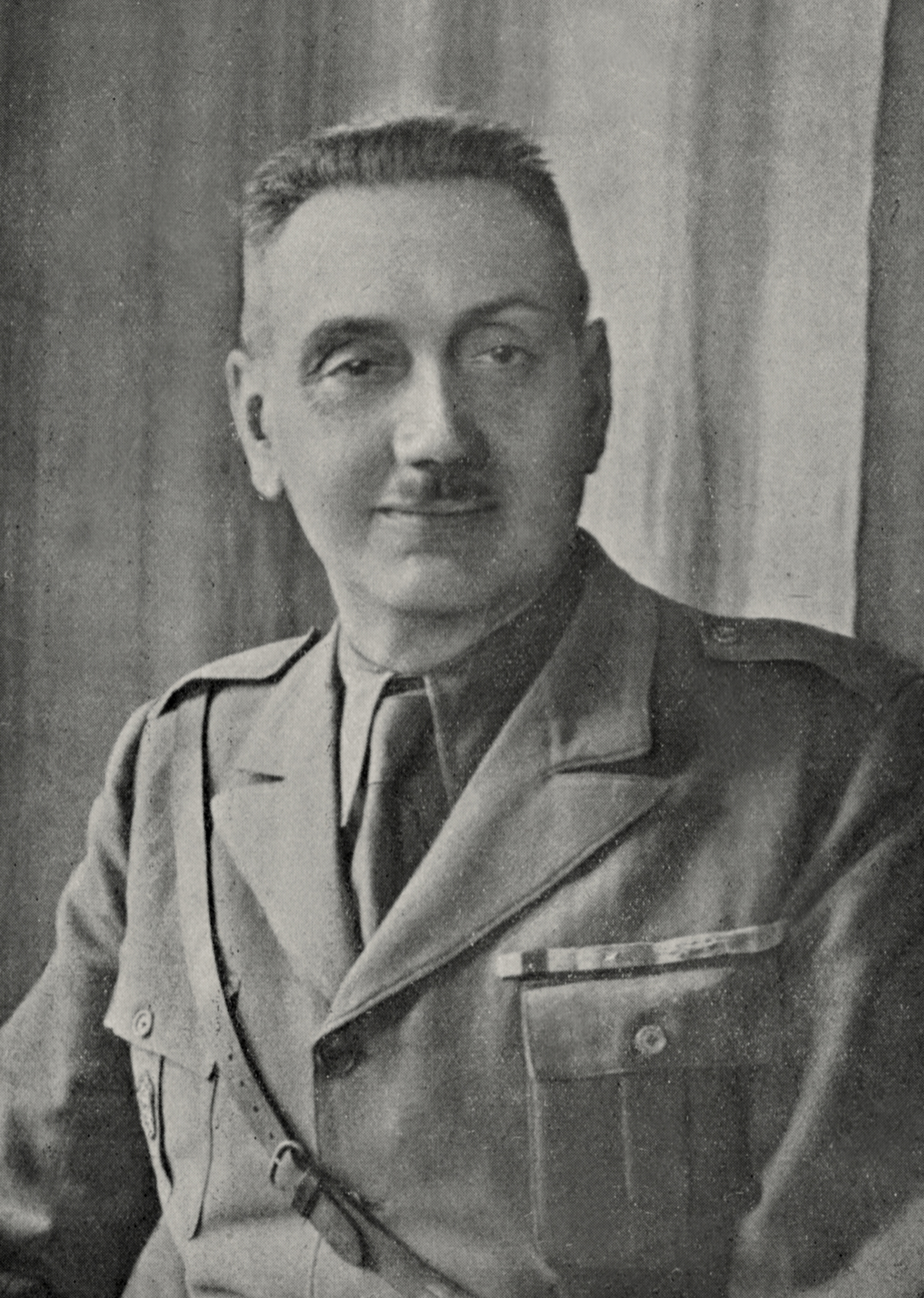
- Born: 3 February 1881; La Spezia, Kingdom of Italy
- Died: 1964 (aged 83); La Spezia, Italy
- Military career
- Allegiance: Kingdom of Italy
- Branch: Royal Italian Army
- Rank: Lieutenant General
- Commands: Corpo Truppe Volontarie; XV Army Corps; Tenth Army (Italy)
- Conflicts: World War I Second Italo-Ethiopian War; Spanish Civil War; World War II; North African Campaign
- Awards: Silver Medal of Military Valor; Military Order of Savoy

Mario Berti (3 February 1881 – 1964) was an Italian officer during World War I and a general in the Spanish Civil War and World War II.

== Personal life ==
Mario Berti was born in La Spezia, which is located in modern-day Liguria.

== World War I ==
He achieved the rank of colonel at an extremely young age (he is still considered one of the youngest Italians ever to have held this rank except for members of the royal family). Originally stationed in Libya by the outbreak of the war, he served on the Trento front in 1916. He saw action at the Battle of Asiago.

== Spanish Civil War ==
As a General, Berti was the commander of the 9th "Pasubio" Infantry Division then commander of the 3 Cavalry Division Amedeo Duca d'Aosta before becoming the Deputy Commander of the Corps of Volunteer Troops (Corpo di Truppe Volontarie, or CTV) during the Spanish Civil War in 1937. Subsequently, Berti became commander of the CTV from late 1937 into 1938 during the Aragon Offensive at General Franco's request.
He was Commander of the Italian XV Corps from 1939 to 1940.

== World War II ==
At the beginning of the war Berti was the Chief of Staff of the Italian Army. However Italy's commitment in Spain had drained it of resources which made it not ready to fight against Britain and France. Many Generals including Berti made this clear to Mussolini. As a result, he was demoted and sidelined. He was appointed Commissioner of Libya. He had fallen out of favour with Mussolini and Graziani had taken his place.

In the summer of 1940, Berti replaced Francesco Guidi as the commander of the Italian Tenth Army in Libya. On 13 September 1940, Berti was in command of the Tenth Army during the Italian invasion of Egypt. Halted at Sidi Barrani by logistical problems, Berti deployed his advanced units in a series of fortified strongpoints. He then began work on extending the Via Balbia into Egypt. The fortified strong points were not mutually supporting. Large gaps between them were only covered by motorised patrols.

A build-up for a new Italian offensive further into Egypt was delayed by the Italian invasion of Greece. The offensive in Egypt was rescheduled and a mid-December launch was planned. However, prior to this, General Berti went on sick leave and Italo Gariboldi took his place temporarily.

On 9 December 1940, Berti was on leave when British General Richard O'Connor launched Operation Compass. On 14 December, Berti arrived back in North Africa. The British forces had exploited the gaps between the Italian fortified camps and in three days were able to overrun them and to capture or destroy almost all of the Italian defenders. On 11 December, Sidi Barrani fell. By 16 December, the Italians had been ejected from Egypt.

On 23 December, Berti was replaced by General Giuseppe Tellera as commander of the Tenth Army. Tellera was to die in action at Beda Fomm.
