= Corpo Truppe Volontarie =

Fascist Italian expeditionary force

Corps of Volunteer Troops Corpo Truppe Volontarie
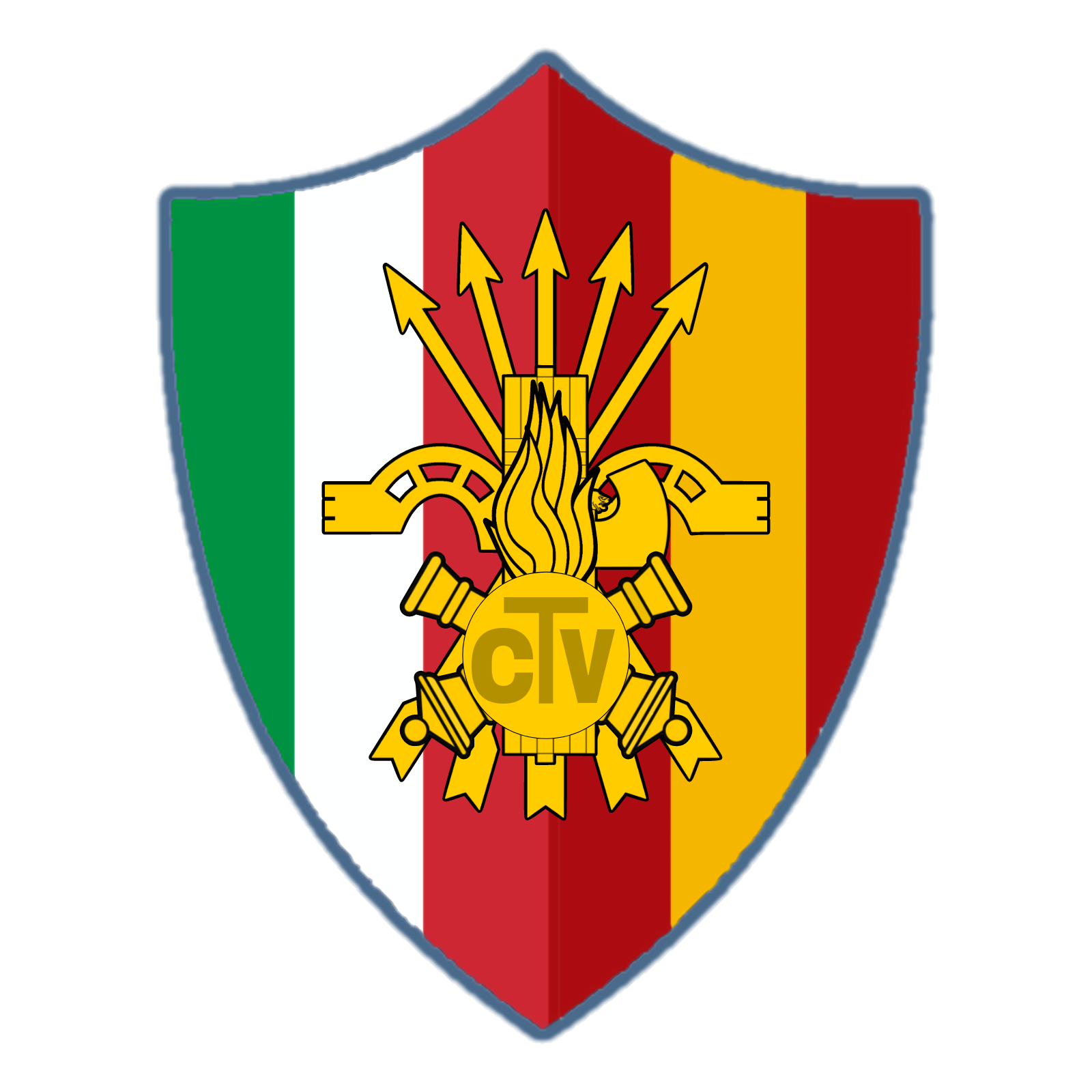
- Symbol of the CTV
- Active: December 1936 – April 1939
- Country: Italy
- Allegiance: (Francoist Spain) Nationalist faction
- Branch: Army
- Type: Infantry
- Role: Motorized infantry
- Size: 70,000–75,000 troops (peak); 758 planes
- Engagements: Spanish Civil War; Battle of Málaga; Battle of Guadalajara; Battle of Bilbao; Battle of Santander; Aragon Offensive; Battle of the Ebro; Catalonia Offensive; Final offensive

Commanders
- Notable commanders: Mario Roatta; Ettore Bastico; Mario Berti; Gastone Gambara

The Corps of Volunteer Troops (Italian: Corpo Truppe Volontarie, CTV) was a Fascist Italian expeditionary force of military volunteers, which was sent to Spain to support the Nationalist forces under General Francisco Franco against the Spanish Republic during the Spanish Civil War, 1936–39.

== Background ==
In July 1936, at the beginning of Spanish Civil War, most of the elite Nationalist forces were isolated in Spanish Morocco or on the Canary Islands. Meanwhile, in Spain, smaller formations of Nationalists and Guardia Civil forces were locked in combat with pro-government militias, Assault Guards and those army units which remained loyal to the leftist Popular Front government. Making the situation more difficult for the Nationalists was that the Spanish Republican Air Force and Navy generally remained loyal to the government.

If the Nationalist forces fighting in Spain did not receive reinforcements, the rebellion could soon fail. General Francisco Franco and the other Nationalist leaders sent emissaries to Berlin and to Rome to ask for help. The German dictator, Adolf Hitler, and the Italian dictator, Benito Mussolini, immediately responded in a positive manner. They sent transport aircraft and crews to Morocco to airlift Nationalist forces from there to Spain. The colonial troops from Morocco allowed the Nationalist forces to take the initiative on mainland Spain.

The Italians also used Nationalist-held and Portuguese harbours as staging points for sending supplies to the Nationalist forces and for landing Spanish troops to support the rebellion. Italian submarines began to sink Spanish, Soviet and other nations' ships that were transporting materials through the Mediterranean to Republican harbours. However, action by the League of Nations resulted in the Nyon Agreement of September 1937, which classed these operations as acts of piracy and was enforced by the French Navy and the British Royal Navy.

== Organization ==
=== The CTV under Roatta (February-April 1937) ===
When founded, the CTV consisted of four all-Italian divisions, under the joint command of General Mario Roatta as CTV commander:

- the 1st CC.NN. Division "Dio lo Vuole" under General Edmondo Rossi
- the 2nd CC.NN. Division "Fiamme Nere" under General Amerigo Coppi
- the 3rd CC.NN. Division "Penne Nere" under General Luigi Nuvolini
- the 4th Infantry Division "Littorio" provided by the army under General Annibale Bergonzoli

=== The CTV under Bastico (April-October 1937) ===
After the defeat of the Italian troops in the Battle of Guadalajara, Roatta was replaced by Ettore Bastico on April 15, 1937. Bastico immediately initiated a reorganization of the CTV: the blackshirt divisions Dio lo Vuole and Penne Nere, which had proven useless in combat, were sent back to Italy. In return, 1,500 new soldiers arrived from Italy in June, after which the CTV was divided into three larger units:

- the Littorio division under General Bergonozoli
- the Fiamme Nere division under General Luigi Frusci
- the Division XXIII di Marzo

In addition, the mixed division Frecce Nere was added.

=== The CTV under Berti (October 1937–October 1938) ===
After the victory at Santander, the CTV was reorganized again in the fall of 1937. The new commander was General Mario Berti, and the divisions under his command were reduced from three to two (Littorio and XXIII Marzo) due to the high losses. In the winter, the mixed Frecce Division was added, which essentially consisted of the Frecce Azurre and Frecce Nere brigades.

=== The CTV under Gambara (October 1938 - April 1939) ===
Badge of the Littorio d'Assalto

For the final phase of the war, command of the CTV was transferred to Gastone Gambara on October 24, 1938. The CTV forces at the Catalonia Offensive now consisted of the new division Littorio d'Assalto as well as the three mixed divisions Frecce Nere, Frecce Azurre and Frecce Verdi.

== Recruitment ==
The casualty registers suggest that the army personnel consisted disproportionately of recruits from the southern regions of Italy and the islands. Northern and central Italy contained about two-thirds of the total Italian population, but only a third of all of the CTV's fallen army soldiers came from these regions. In contrast, southern Italy and the islands, with only a third of the total population, accounted for two thirds of the fallen army soldiers.

== Timeline ==
=== 1936 ===
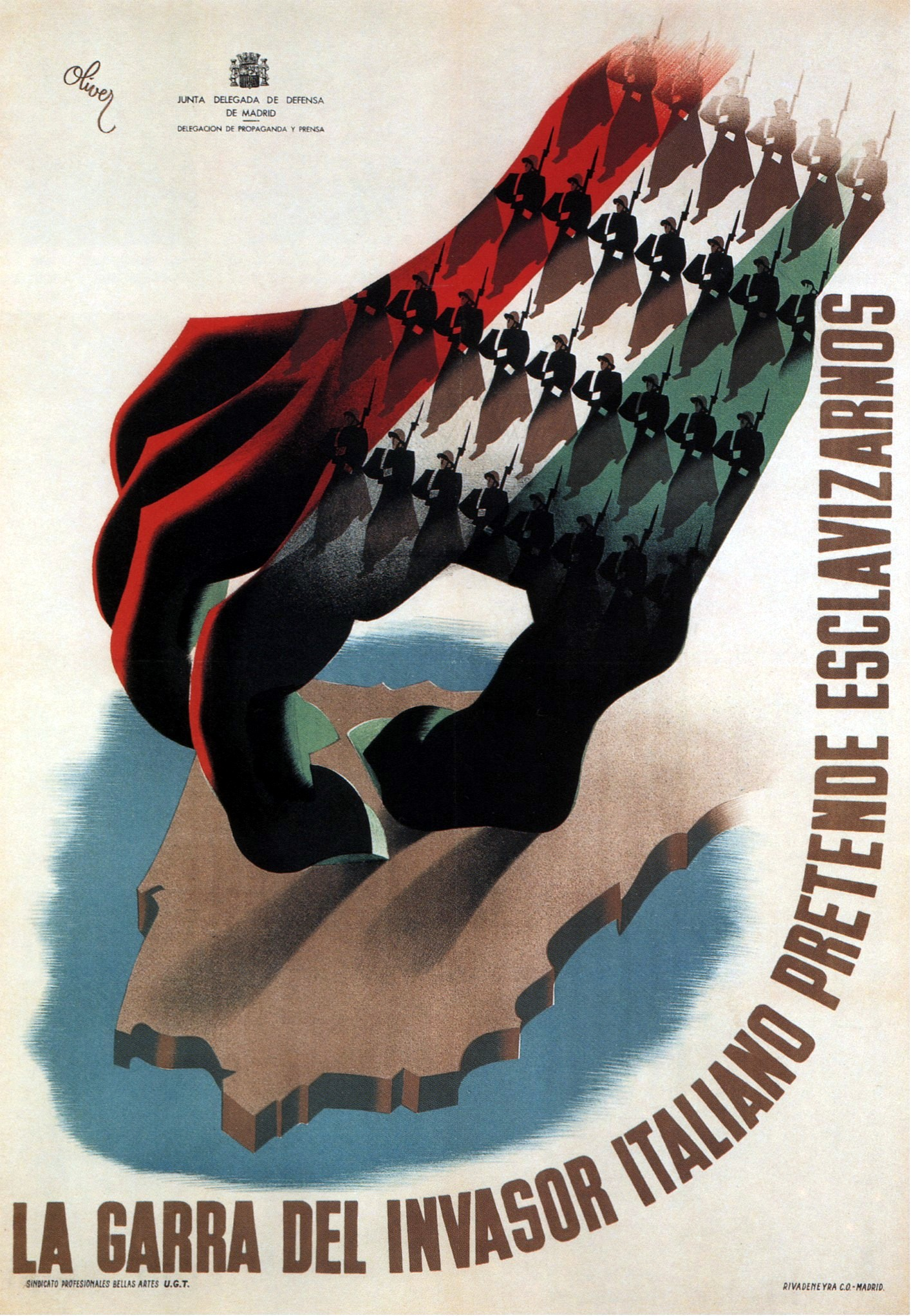
Republican propaganda poster against "the claw of the Italian invader".

3 September: Republican forces from Catalonia, under the command of Captain Alberto Bayo, made a landing on Mallorca. His formations were the target of the Italian Air Force, which attacked on 24 October. On the same date, Italian bombers and fighters launched their first air raid on Madrid. That was intended to demonstrate to the Republican forces the power of Franco's allies. In the following days, they began a series of bombing raids on the Spanish capital.

2 November: Italian and German bombers and their fighter escorts were attacked by Soviet aircraft, nicknamed "Chatos" by the Spanish, which resulted in some losses for the Italians.

12 December: After the failure of Franco's offensive on Madrid, Mussolini decided to send regular army forces to Spain. Mussolini made that decision after he had consulted Italian Minister of Foreign Affairs Galeazzo Ciano and General Mario Roatta, who were then two of the most influential men in Italy. Roatta was made the Commander-in-Chief of the Italian "expeditionary force". General Luigi Frusci became his Deputy Commander.

23 December: The first formation of 3,000 troops landed in Cádiz and was called the "Italian Army Mission".

=== 1937 ===
January: By then, approximately 44,000 regular Italian army soldiers and members of the Fascist paramilitary (Blackshirts) were in Spain. In late February, the "expeditionary force" was renamed the "Corps of Volunteer Troops" (Corpo Truppe Volontarie, or CTV).

The Blackshirt (Camicie Nere, CCNN) Divisions contained regular soldiers and volunteer militia from the National Fascist Party. The CCNN divisions were semi-motorised. There, it also had the independent XXIII de Marzo Group of CCNN infantry.

The Italian CTV also had a Tank and Armoured Cars Group, Corps Artillery of ten regiments (Groups) of field artillery and four batteries of anti-aircraft artillery.

3 to 8 February: The 1st CCNN Division "Dio lo Vuole", in support of the Nationalists, launched an offensive against Málaga. On 8 February, the Italians and Nationalists captured the city. The Battle of Málaga was a decisive victory for the Nationalists. About 74 Italian soldiers were killed, 221 wounded, and two missing in that battle.

March: The Corps of Volunteer Troops now numbered over 50,000 troops.

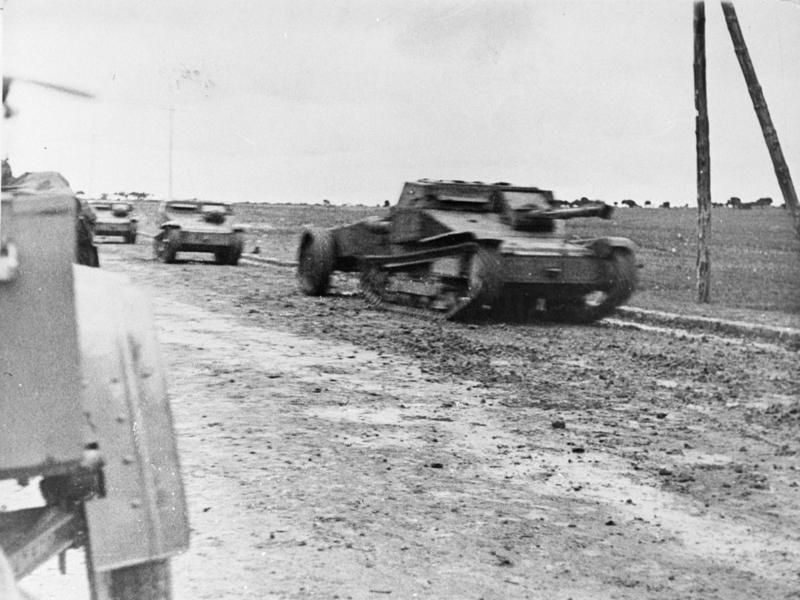
Italian tankettes advancing with a flame thrower tank in the lead at the Battle of Guadalajara.

8 to 23 March: Mussolini decided that Fascist Italian forces should lead a fourth offensive on Madrid. The Italian offensive resulted in the Battle of Guadalajara, which ended as a decisive victory for the Republican forces. In contrast, the Italian forces suffered heavy losses. The Italian armour, consisting for the most part of L3/35 tankettes, proved to be no match for the tanks that were provided to the Republicans by the Soviet Union. The Italian offensive was repulsed by a strong Republican counter-offensive led by the 11th Division. Of the four Italian divisions engaged, only the Littorio Division did not suffer heavy losses. The three CCNN divisions had such heavy losses that they had to be reorganised into two divisions and a special weapons (armour and artillery) group. The 3rd CCNN Division was disbanded and consolidated with the 2nd CCNN Division in April 1937.

April to August: Following the reduction of the CCNN Divisions, Italians began to serve in mixed Italo-Spanish Flechas ("Arrows") units, with the Italians providing the officers and technical personnel and the Spanish served in the rank and file. The first were the Flechas Azules (“Blue Arrows”) Mixed Brigade and the Flechas Negras (“Black Arrows”) Mixed Brigade, which served respectively in Extremadura and Viscaya from April to August 1937. Also in Viscaya were the CTV's XXIII de Marzo Group and 11 Artillery Groups.

August to September: Roatta's replacement, General Ettore Bastico, commanded the CTV forces including the Division XXIII di Marzo, formed from the XXIII de Marzo Group. The CTV broke the Republicans' lines near Soncillo; captured a key pass, the Puerto del Escudo; and penetrated deep into the Republican rear during the Battle of Santander, which resulted in a decisive victory for the Nationalists. They were then transferred to the Aragón front. Some CTV forces may have been involved in the Battle of El Mazuco, but details are unconfirmed.

October: After the northern campaigns, the 1st CCNN Division and 2nd CCNN Division were consolidated with the Division XXIII di Marzo and renamed the XXIII de Marzo - Llamas Negras Division.

=== 1938 ===
March: The Flechas Negras Brigade was expanded into the Flechas Division "Arrows" and served in the Aragon Offensive and the March to the Sea, with the CTV now under Mario Berti.

18 March: Barcelona was the target of 13 Italian large-scale air raids. Mussolini ordered the bombings without consulting Franco. The Italian aircraft were armed with incendiary and gas bombs, which resulted in the death of around 2,500 civilians.

November: The Flechas Division was strengthened and renamed "Flechas Negras", and the Flechas Azules Brigade was expanded into two other Flechas Divisions, which took part in the Catalonia Offensive the final offensive of the war, along with the rest of the CTV under Gastone Gambara:

=== 1939 ===
February: After the victory of Franco and the Nationalists over the Republicans, General Bastico and the Italian volunteers left Spain.

== Aftermath ==
On 1 April 1939, the success of the Nationalists meant that the Italians now had a friendly regime in the western Mediterranean. Of the approximately 78,500 men sent to Spain, 3,819 had been killed and 10,629 wounded. Most of the casualties were caused during the Catalan and the Aragonese Offensives, with about 44% of the deaths and 43% of the wounded, and the rest during the Guadalajara, Santander and Levante offensives. The Italian military left behind roughly 3,400 machine guns, 1,400 mortars, 1,800 artillery pieces, 6,800 vehicles, 160 tankettes and 760 aircraft. However, while the military equipment represented a loss to Italy's war inventory, most of the equipment was obsolete and outdated. The financial cost of the CTV and AL to Italy was higher and amounted to between 6 and 8.5 billion lire. At 14 to 20 percent of annual expenditure, that represented an immense drain on the Italian economy. The high cost of the Spanish expedition further limited Italy's economic output in the period before the Second World War.

== See also ==
- Italian Royal Air Force (Regia Aeronautica) and Aviation Legion (Aviazione Legionaria)
- Italian Royal Navy (Regia Marina) and Submariners Legion (Sottomarini Legionari)
- Luigi Frusci - Deputy Commander-in-Chief of the CTV
- Giorgio Perlasca - served in the CTV with honors. He later used his letter of commendation from Franco to pass for a Spanish diplomat in Budapest, saving thousands of Hungarian Jews from the Nazi extermination camps.
- Santoña Agreement - the surrendering of the Basque Army to the CTV.

== Sources ==
- Hurtado, Víctor; Segura, Antoni; Villarroya, Joan (2012). Atles de la Guerra Civil a Catalunya (book) (in Catalan) (2nd ed.). Barcelona: Edicions DAU and Ajuntament de Barcelona. ISBN 978-84-9850-382-1.
- de Mesa, José Luis, El regreso de las legiones: (la ayuda militar italiana a la España nacional, 1936-1939), García Hispán, Granada:España, 1994 ISBN 84-87690-33-5
- Leon Wyszczelski "Madryt 1936-1937" Historical Battles published by Ministry of National Defence, Warsaw 1988.
- Some details from the Republican perspective on the Italian military in Spain appears in the works of Luigi Longo, a former organizer of the International Brigades.
- Information on Italian army activities appearing in this article was taken from lacucaracha.info "La Cucaracha": Civil War in Spain 1936-1939 Official website.
