= 1st CC.NN. Division "23 Marzo" =

Italian CC.NN. (Blackshirts militia) division

- 1ª Divisione CC.NN. "23 Marzo"
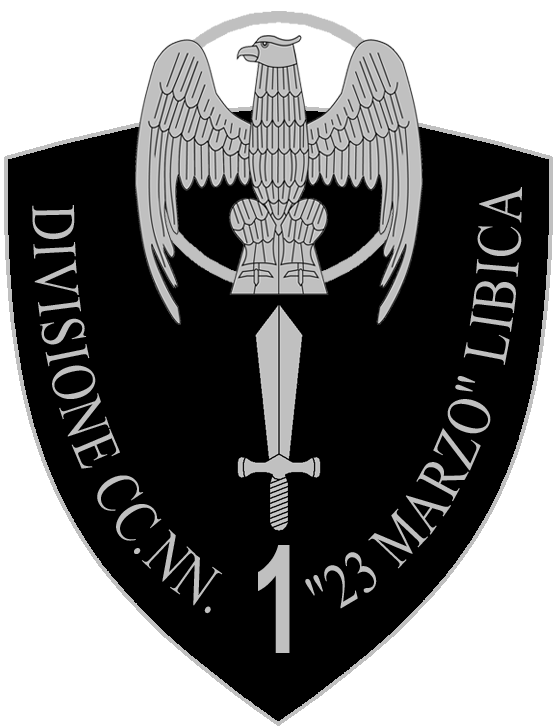
- 1st CC.NN. Division "23 Marzo" insignia
- Active: 23 April 1935 – May 1936; 1939 – 5 January 1941
- Country: Italy
- Branch: MVSN
- Type: Infantry
- Size: Division
- Garrison/HQ: Chieti
- Patron: Founding date of the Fasci Italiani di Combattimento
- Motto: "Implacabile" (English: Relentless)
- Engagements: Second Italo-Ethiopian War: Battle of Amba Aradam; Second battle of Tembien; World War II: Western Desert campaign; Italian invasion of Egypt; Operation Compass; Battle of Bardia

Insignia
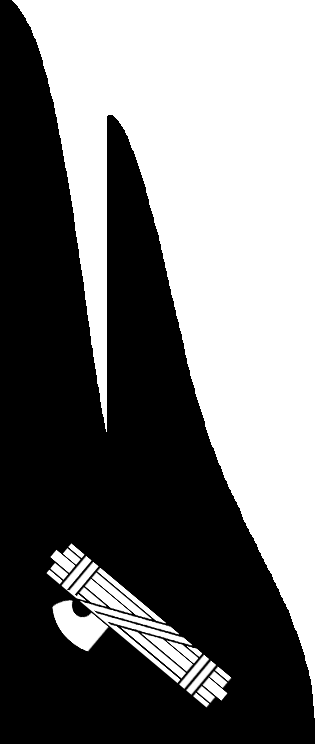
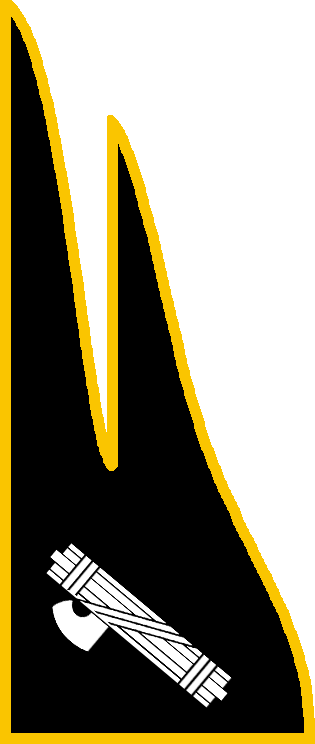
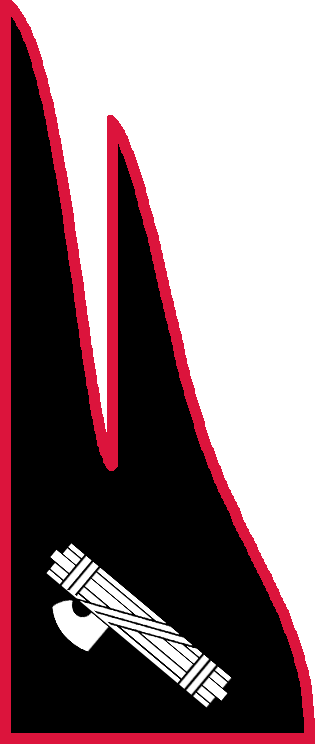
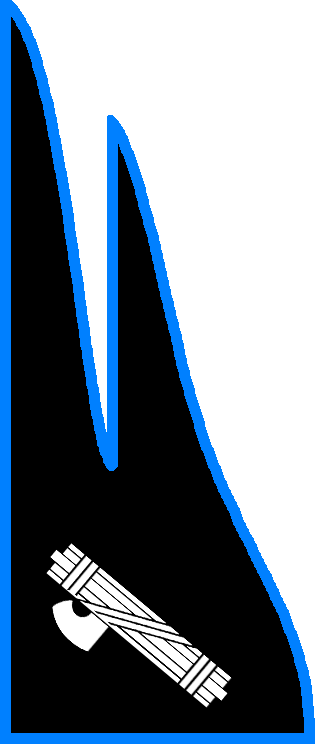
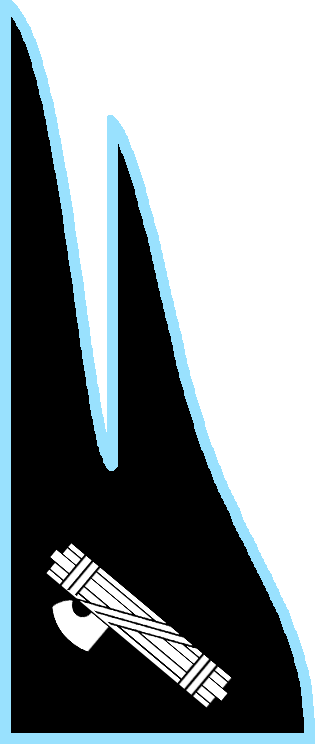
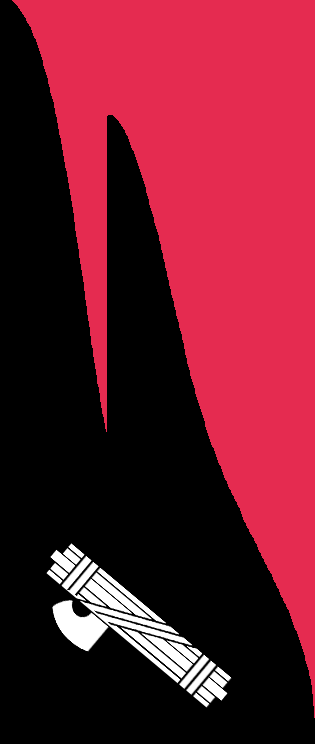
- Identification symbol: 1st CC.NN. Division gorget patches

The 1st CC.NN. Division "23 Marzo" (Italian: 1ª Divisione CC.NN. "23 Marzo") was an Italian CC.NN. (Blackshirts militia) division raised on 23 April 1935 for the Second Italo-Ethiopian War against Ethiopia. The name "23 Marzo" ("March 23rd") was chosen to commemorate the founding date of the Fasci Italiani di Combattimento on 23 March 1919. The division took part in the Italian invasion of Egypt and was destroyed during the Battle of Bardia in January 1941.

== History ==
The division was one of six CC.NN. divisions raised in summer 1935 in preparation for the Second Italo-Ethiopian War. Its members were volunteers from the various armed militias of the National Fascist Party's paramilitary wing and came from two regions: the 135th and 192nd CC.NN. legions, and the I CC.NN. Machine Gun Battalion from Tuscany and the 202nd CC.NN. Legion from Umbria.

=== Second Italo-Ethiopian War ===
The division arrived in Massawa in Italian Eritrea between 28 August and September 1935. On 3 October the division crossed the Balasa river into Ethiopia. The division participated in the Battle of Amba Aradam and then in the Second Battle of Tembien. During the war the division suffered a total of 108 casualties. After the war the division was repatriated and then disbanded.

=== World War II ===
The division was reformed in Chieti in 1939 and sent with three other CC.NN. divisions to Italian Libya. The division took part in the invasion of Egypt in September 1940, reaching Sidi Barrani in Egypt by October. On 1 December 1940 the division was at Bardia, where it was surrounded with other Italian units by British forces during Operation Compass. After a short siege the division was destroyed during the Battle of Bardia on 3-5 January 1941.

== Organization ==
=== Second Italo-Ethiopian War ===
Below follows the division's organization during the Second Italo-Ethiopian War and the cities, in which its CC.NN. battalions and companies/batteries were raised.

- 1st CC.NN. Division "23 Marzo"
  - 135th CC.NN. Legion "Indomita", in La Spezia
    - Command Company
    - CXXXV CC.NN. Battalion, in La Spezia
    - CLXXXVIII CC.NN. Battalion, in Livorno
    - 135th CC.NN. Machine Gun Company, in Volterra
    - 135th CC.NN. Artillery Battery, in Rome (65/17 mod. 13 mountain guns)
  - 192nd CC.NN. Legion "Francesco Ferrucci", in Florence
    - Command Company
    - CXC CC.NN. Battalion, in Pisa
    - CXCV CC.NN. Battalion, in Florence
    - 192nd CC.NN. Machine Gun Company, in Empoli
    - 192nd CC.NN. Artillery Battery, in Florence (65/17 mod. 13 mountain guns)
  - 202nd CC.NN. Legion "Cacciatori del Tevere", in Perugia
    - Command Company
    - CCII CC.NN. Battalion, in Perugia
    - CCIV CC.NN. Battalion, in Terni
    - 202nd CC.NN. Machine Gun Company, in Arezzo
    - 202nd CC.NN. Artillery Battery, in Rome (65/17 mod. 13 mountain guns)
  - I CC.NN. Machine Gun Battalion, in Pisa
  - I Artillery Group (65/17 mod. 13 mountain guns, Royal Italian Army)
  - I Mixed Transport Unit (Royal Italian Army)
  - I Supply Unit (Royal Italian Army)
  - 1st Special Engineer Company (Royal Italian Army)
  - 1st Medical Section (Royal Italian Army)
  - 1st Logistic Section (Royal Italian Army)
  - 1st Carabinieri Section

The supply unit had 1,600 mules and the mixed transport unit 80 light trucks. The division engaged in war crimes in Ethiopia during the Second Italo-Ethiopian War.

=== World War II ===
1st CC.NN. Division "23 Marzo" organization

Below follows the division's organization at the start of the Italian invasion of Egypt and the cities, in which its CC.NN. battalions were raised.

- 1st CC.NN. Division "23 Marzo"
  - Headquarters
    - Command Company
    - 701st Carabinieri Section
    - 702nd Carabinieri Section
    - 301st Field Post Office
  - 219th CC.NN. Legion, in Frosinone
    - Command Company
    - CXIV CC.NN. Battalion "G. Veroli", in Tivoli
    - CXVIII CC.NN. Battalion "Volsca", in Velletri
    - CXIX CC.NN. Battalion "N. Ricciotti", in Frosinone
    - 219th CC.NN. Machine Gun Company
  - 233rd CC.NN. Legion, in Campobasso
    - Command Company
    - CXXIX CC.NN. Battalion "Adriatica", in Pescara
    - CXXXIII CC.NN. Battalion "Lupi del Matese", in Campobasso
    - CXLVIII CC.NN. Battalion "Tavoliere", in Foggia
    - 233rd CC.NN. Machine Gun Company
  - 201st Artillery Regiment "23 Marzo" (formed by the depot of the 9th Army Corps Artillery Regiment in Foggia)
    - Command Unit
    - I Group (75/27 mod. 06 field guns)
    - II Group (75/27 mod. 06 field guns)
    - III Group (100/17 mod. 14 howitzers)
    - 1st Anti-aircraft Battery (20/65 mod. 35 anti-aircraft guns)
    - 201st Anti-aircraft Battery (20/65 mod. 35 anti-aircraft guns)
    - 219th Support Weapons Battery (65/17 mod. 13 mountain guns)
    - 233rd Support Weapons Battery (65/17 mod. 13 mountain guns)
    - Ammunition and Supply Unit
  - CCI Machine Gun Battalion (Royal Italian Army)
  - CCI Mixed Engineer Battalion (Royal Italian Army)
    - Command Platoon
    - 1 × Engineer Company
    - 1 × Telegraph and Radio Operators Company
    - 1 × Searchlight Section
  - 201st CC.NN. Anti-tank Company (47/32 mod. 35 anti-tank guns)
  - 201st CC.NN. Support Weapons Battery (65/17 mod. 13 mountain guns)
  - 201st CC.NN. Mortar Company (81mm mod. 35 mortars)
  - 201st Medical Section (Royal Italian Army)
    - 3 × Field hospitals
    - 1 × Surgical Unit
  - 201st Supply Section (Royal Italian Army)
  - 201st Transport Section (Royal Italian Army)

Attached during the Battle of Bardia:

- LXI Tank Battalion L (L3/33 and L3/35 tankettes, Royal Italian Army)

== CC.NN. Grouping "23 Marzo" ==
For the Italian participation in the Eastern Front the regiment-sized CC.NN. Grouping "23 Marzo" was raised as unit of the Italian Army in Russia:

- CC.NN. Grouping "23 Marzo"
  - CC.NN. Battalions Group "Valle Scrivia"
    - Command Company
    - V CC.NN. Assault Battalion, in Tortona
    - XXXIV CC.NN. Assault Battalion, in Savona
    - XLI CC.NN. Support Weapons Battalion, in Trento
  - CC.NN. Battalions Group "Leonessa"
    - Command Company
    - XIV CC.NN. Assault Battalion, in Bergamo
    - XV CC.NN. Assault Battalion, in Brescia
    - XXXVIII CC.NN. Support Weapons Battalion, in Asti

== Commanding officers ==
During the Second Italo-Ethiopian War:

- Generale di Divisione Ettore Bastico (23 April 1935 - 20 October 1935)
- Generale di Divisione Prince Filiberto, Duke of Genoa (21 October 1935 - 29 February 1936)
- Generale di Divisione Carlo Carini (1 March 1936 - ?)

During the Italian invasion of Egypt:

- Generale di Divisione Francesco Antonelli (1939 - 5 January 1941, POW)

== See also ==
- Division XXIII di Marzo

== Sources ==
- Lucas, Ettore; de Vecchi, Giorgio (1976). Storia delle Unità Combattenti della Milizia Volontaria per la Sicurezza Nazionale 1923–1943. Roma: Giovanni Volpe Editore. pp. 63–116. OCLC 797527296.
- Nafziger, George F. (1996). Black Shirt, Mountain, Assault & Landing Divisions, Corps Troops and the 1944 Liberation Army. The Italian Order of Battle in WWII: an Organizational History of the Divisions and Independent Brigades of the Italian Army. Vol. III. Ohio: West Chester. OCLC 39214181.
