= Blackshirts =

Paramilitary of the Italian National Fascist Party

Voluntary Militia for National Security
- Milizia Volontaria per la Sicurezza Nazionale
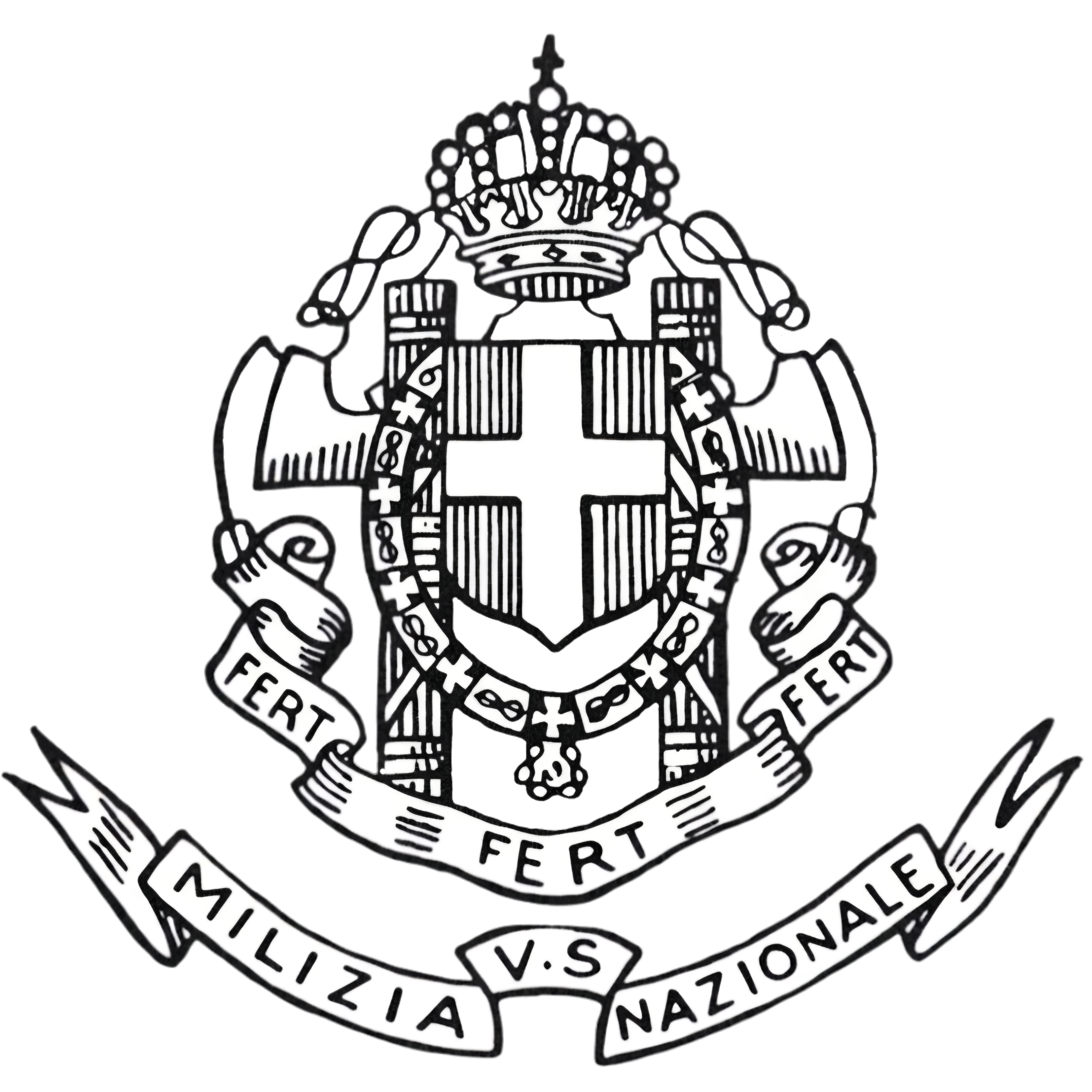
- Institutional emblem (1929–1943)
- Active: 23 March 1923 – 8 December 1943
- Country: Kingdom of Italy
- Allegiance: National Fascist Party
- Type: Paramilitary, militia
- Size: 351,000
- Garrison/HQ: Rome
- Colors: Black
- Engagements: Second Italo-Senussi War; Second Italo-Ethiopian War; Spanish Civil War; Italian invasion of Albania; World War II

Commanders
- Commandant-General: See list
- Chief of Staff: See list

Insignia
- Mod. 41 helmet decal

The Voluntary Militia for National Security (Italian: Milizia Volontaria per la Sicurezza Nazionale, MVSN), commonly called the Blackshirts (Italian: Camicie Nere, CCNN, singular: Camicia Nera) or squadristi (singular: squadrista), was originally the paramilitary wing of the National Fascist Party, known as the Squadrismo, and after 1923 an all-volunteer militia of the Kingdom of Italy under Fascist rule, similar to the SA. Its members were distinguished by their black uniforms (modelled on those of the Arditi, Italy's elite troops of World War I) and their loyalty to Benito Mussolini, the Duce (leader) of Fascism, to whom they swore an oath. The founders of the paramilitary groups were nationalist intellectuals, former army officers and young landowners opposing peasants' and country labourers' unions. Their methods became harsher as Mussolini's power grew, and they used violence and intimidation against Mussolini's opponents. In 1943, following the fall of the Fascist regime, the MVSN was integrated into the Royal Italian Army and disbanded.

== History ==
A typical flag of the squadristi

Blackshirts with Benito Mussolini during the March on Rome, 28 October 1922.

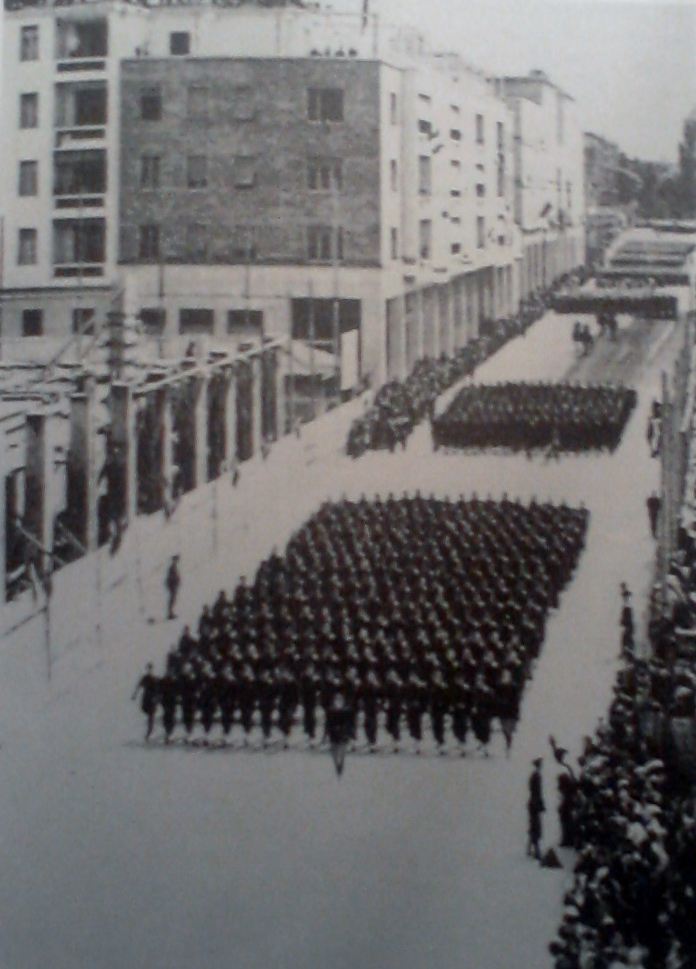
Parade of the Blackshirts on Corso Libertà in Bolzano, c. 1930.

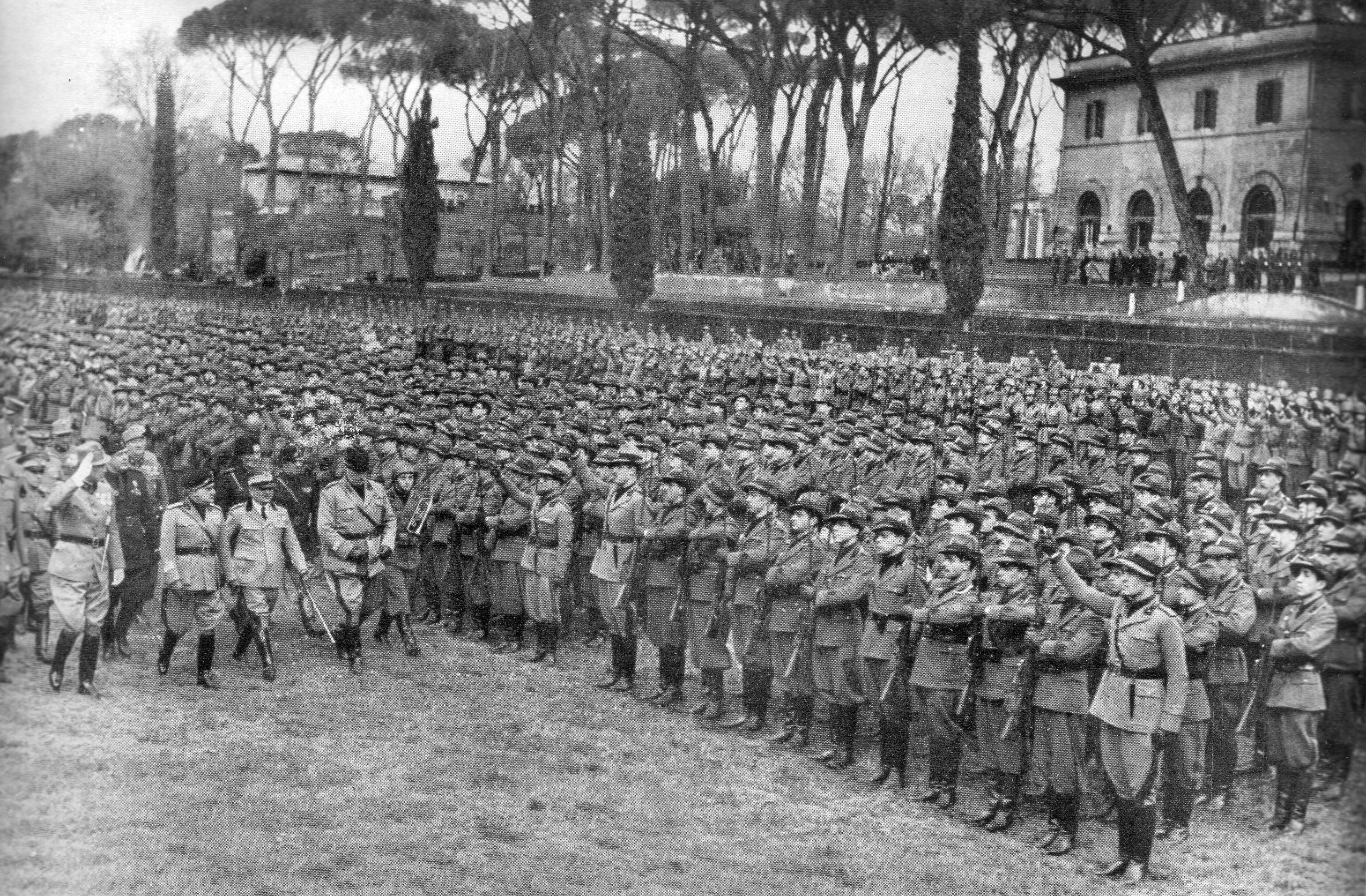
Blackshirts on Piazza di Siena in Rome, 1936.

The Blackshirts, formally established as the Squadrismo in 1919, comprised numerous disgruntled demobilized soldiers. It was given the task of leading fights against their bitter enemies—the Socialists. They may have numbered 200,000 by the time of Mussolini's March on Rome from 28 to 31 October 1922. In 1922 the squadristi were reorganized into the milizia and formed numerous bandiere, and on 1 February 1923, the Blackshirts became the Voluntary Militia for National Security (Milizia Volontaria per la Sicurezza Nazionale, or MVSN), which lasted until 8 September 1943 Armistice of Cassibile. The Italian Social Republic, located in the areas of northern Italy occupied by Germany, reformed the MVSN on 8 December 1943 into the National Republican Guard (Guardia Nazionale Repubblicana, or GNR).

== Organization ==
Benito Mussolini was the leader, or Commandant–General and First Honorary Corporal, of the Blackshirts, but executive functions were carried out by the Chief of Staff, equivalent to an army general. The MVSN was formed in imitation of the ancient Roman army, as follows:

=== Basic organisation ===
The terms after the first are not words common to European armies (e.g., the Italian battaglione has cognates in many languages). Instead, they derive from the structure of the ancient Roman army.

- Zona (zone) = division
- Legione (legion) = regiment, each legion was a militia unit consisting of a small active cadre and a large reserve of civilian volunteers.
- Coorte (cohort) = battalion
- Centuria (centuria) = company
- Manipolo (maniple) = platoon
- Squadra (squad) = squad

These units were also organised on the triangular principle as follows:

- 3 squadre = 1 manipolo (maniple)
- 3 manipoli = 1 centuria (centuria)
- 3 centuriae = 1 coorte (cohort)
- 3 coorti = 1 legione (legion)
- 3 legioni = 1 divisione (field division)
- 3 or more legioni = 1 zona (zone – an administrative division)

=== Territorial organisation ===
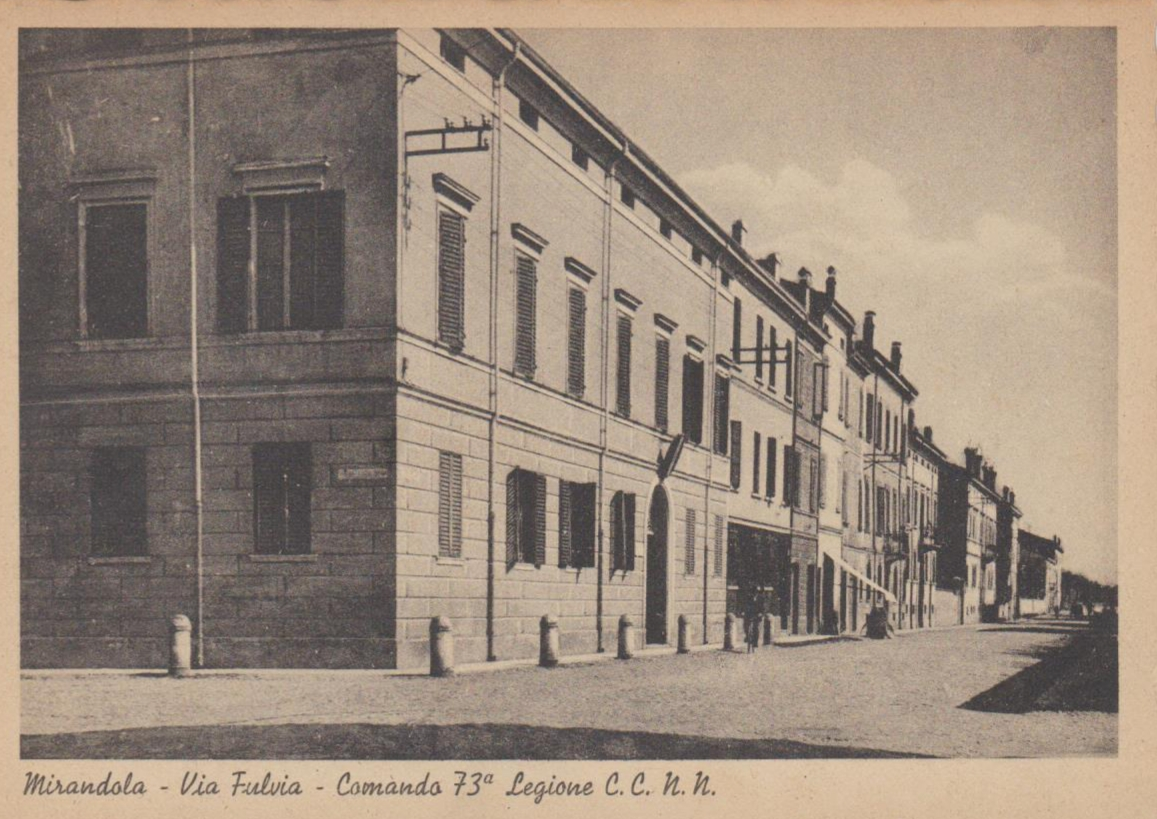
Molinari Palace – Command of the 73rd Blackshirt Legion in Mirandola, Province of Modena, 1941.

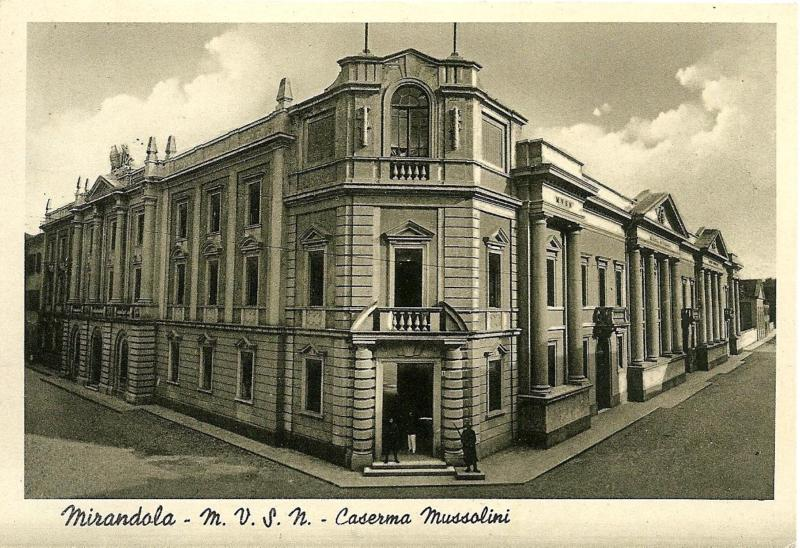
Palace of the Militia in Mirandola, Province of Modena, c. 1930.

The MVSN original organisation consisted of 15 zones controlling 133 legions (one per province) of three cohorts each and one Independent Group controlling 10 legions. In 1929 it was reorganized into four raggruppamenti, but later in October 1936, it was reorganized into 14 zones controlling only 133 legions with two cohorts each one of men 21 to 36 years old and the other of men up to 55 years old. There were also special units in Rome, on Ponza Island and the black-uniformed Moschettieri del Duce ("The Leader's Musketeers", Mussolini's Guard), the Albanian Fascist Militia (four legions) and Milizia Coloniale in Africa (seven legions).

The original organisation by Royal Decrees on 1 February 1923 and 4 August 1924 consisted of fifteen zones, as follows:

- 1st Zone (Piedmont), HQ Turin
  - first Sabauda – Turin
  - second Alpina – Turin
  - third Subalpina – Cuneo
  - fourth Marengo – Alessandria
  - fifth Valle Scrivia – Tortona
  - eleventh Monferrato – Casale
  - twelfth Monte Bianco – Aosta
  - twenty-eighth Randaccio – Vercelli
  - twenty-ninth Alpina – Pallanza
  - thirtieth Oddone – Novara
  - thirty-seventh P. Prestinari – Turin
  - thirty-eighth N. Alfieri – Asti
- Second Zone (Lombardy) HQs Milan
- Third Zone (Liguria) HQ Genoa
- Fourth Zone (Venezia Tridentina) HQ Verona
- Fifth Zone (Veneto) HQ Venice
- Sixth Zone (Venezia Giulia) HQ Trieste
- Seventh Zone (Emilia Romagna) HQ Bologna
- Eighth Zone (Tuscany) HQ Florence
- Ninth Zone (Umbria & Marche) HQ Perugia
- Tenth Zone (Lazio) HQ Rome
- Eleventh Zone (Abruzzo & Molise) HQ Pescara
- Twelfth Zone (Campania) HQ Naples
- Thirteenth Zone (Apulia) HQ Bari
- Fourteenth Zone (Sicily) HQ Palermo
- Fifteenth Zone (Sardinia) HQ Cagliari

=== Security militia ===
Special militias were also organised to provide security police and gendarmerie functions, these included:

- Forestry Militia
- Border Militia
- Highway Militia
- Port Militia
- Posts and Telegraph Militia
- Railway Militia
- University Militia
- Anti-aircraft and Coastal Artillery Militia, a combined command that controlled two militias:
  - Anti-Aircraft Militia
  - Coastal Artillery Militia

=== Standards ===
The standards of each of the units of the Blackshirts, except for the Moschettieri del Duce, which carried a small standard in black similar to those of the regular armed forces, were a modernized form of the standards used by the old Roman army.

=== Ethiopian campaign ===
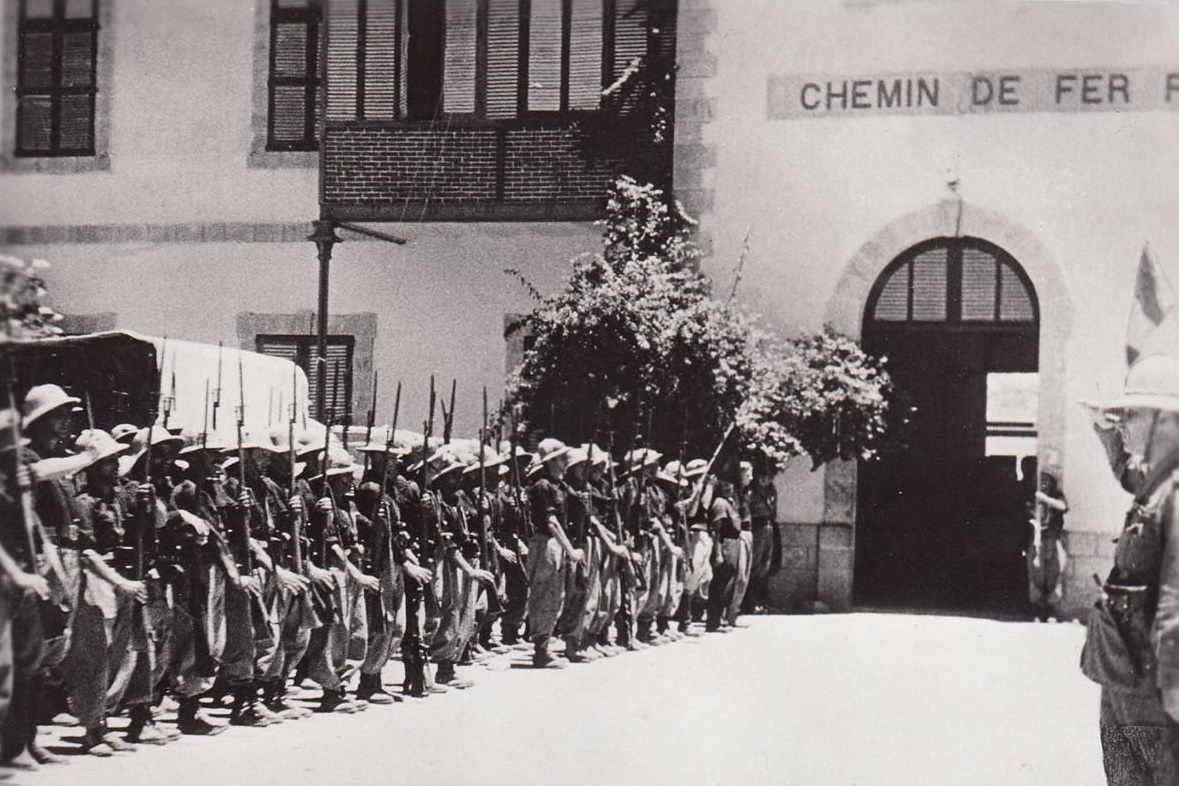
Blackshirts seize a railway station of the Ethio-Djibouti Railways in Dire Dawa, May 1936.

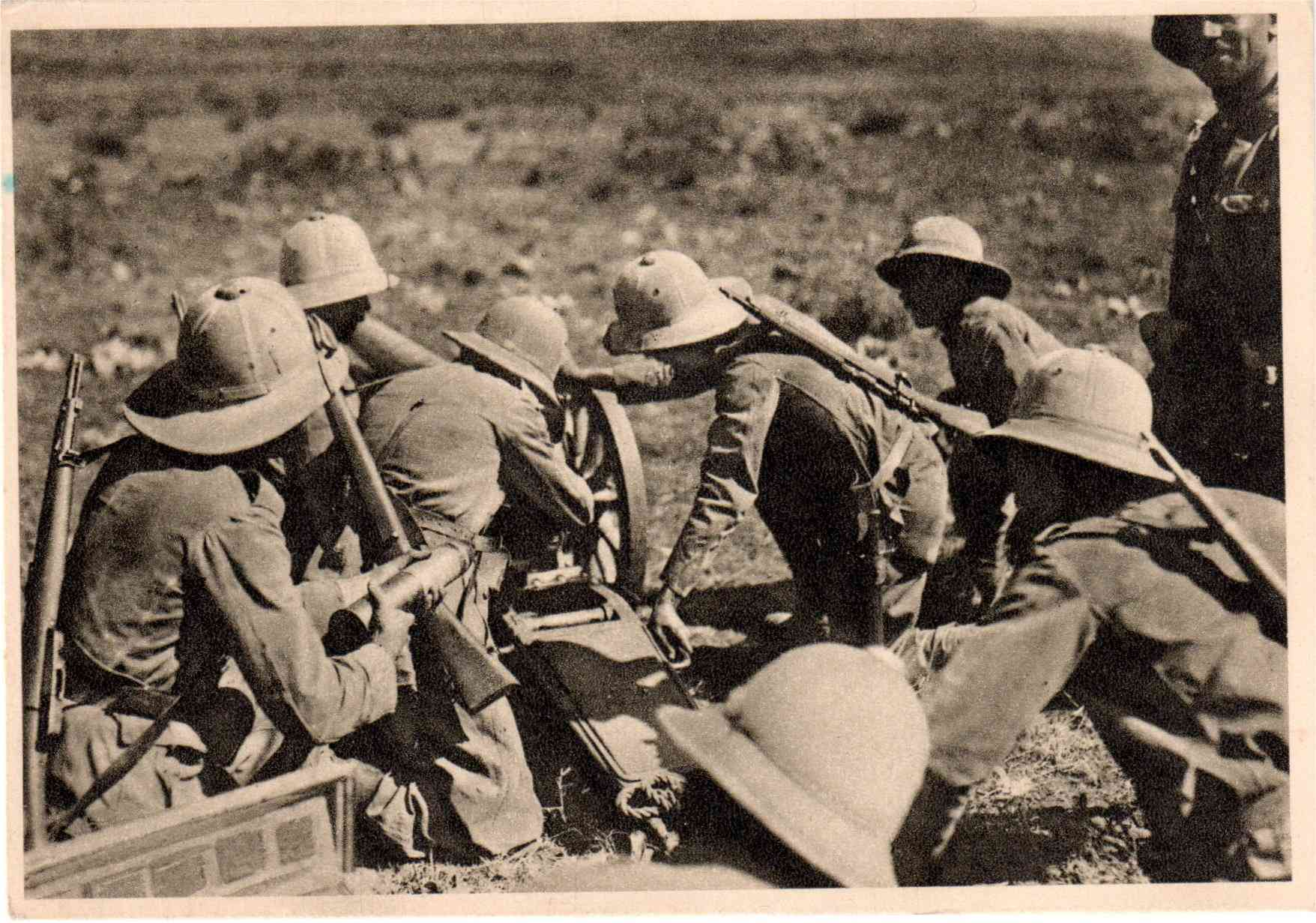
Artillery of the 2nd CC.NN. Division "28 Ottobre" in Ethiopia, 1936.

During the 1935–36 Second Italo-Ethiopian War against the Ethiopian Empire, seven CCNN Divisions were organized:

- 1st CC.NN. Division "23 Marzo" (23rd March)
- 2nd CC.NN. Division "28 Ottobre" (28th October)
- 3rd CC.NN. Division "21 Aprile" (21st April)
- 4th CC.NN. Division "3 Gennaio" (3rd January)
- 5th CC.NN. Division "1 Febbraio" (1st February)
- 6th CC.NN. Division "Tevere" (Tiber)
- 7th CC.NN. Division "Cirene" (Cyrene)

The first six Divisions were sent to Ethiopia, participated in the war and committed war crimes. The seventh was deployed to Italian Libya but not fully equipped or trained before it was disbanded after the war had ended.

== Division organisation ==
=== Organisation on 3 October 1935 ===
- Divisional HQ
- 3 x legions each with:
  - legion HQ
  - 1 legionary machine gun company with 16 machine guns
  - 2 legionary infantry battalions, each with:
    - 1 machine gun company with 8 × 8 mm Breda machine guns and
    - 3 infantry companies each with 9 light machine guns and 3× 45 mm mortars
    - 1 pack-artillery battery with 4 × 65 mm L17 each.
- 1 × artillery battalion (Army) with 3 batteries (65/17)
- 1 × engineers company (mixed Army and Blackshirts)
- 2 × replacements battalions (1 infantry, 1 mixed)
- 1 × medical section
- 1 × logistics section (food)
- 1 × pack-mules unit (1600 mules)
- 1 × mixed trucks unit (80 light trucks)

The Blackshirts Rifle Battalions had three rifle companies but no MMG company. The rifle companies had three platoons (three squads with one LMG each). Each Legion had an MMG company with four platoons of three weapons each (plus two spares). The Blackshirts replacement battalions were organised as the Blackshirts rifle battalions, but its platoons were overstrength (60 men each) and with only 1 × LMG in each platoon.

=== Organisation on 10 June 1940 ===
- Division Command
- 2 Blackshirt legions – each
  - 3 battalions
  - 1 81 mm mortar company
  - 1 accompanying battery 65 mm/17 mtn guns
- 1 machine gun battalion
- 1 artillery regiment:
  - 2 artillery groups
  - 1 artillery group
  - 2 AA batteries 20mm
- 1 mixed engineering battalion
  - 1 ambulance section sanita
  - 3 field hospitals (planned when available)
  - 1 supply section
- 1 section mixed transport

== Spanish Civil War ==
Three CCNN Divisions were sent to participate in the Spanish Civil War as part of the Corpo Truppe Volontarie. The Blackshirt (Camicie Nere, or CCNN) Divisions contained regular soldiers and volunteer militia from the Fascist Party. The CCNN divisions were semi-motorised.

- 1st CC.NN. Division "Dio lo Vuole" ("God Wills it")
- 2nd CC.NN. Division "Fiamme Nere" ("Black Flames")
- 3rd CC.NN. Division "Penne Nere" ("Black Feathers")

The 3rd CCNN Division was disbanded and consolidated with the 2nd CCNN Division in April 1937 after their defeat at Guadalajara. After the campaigns in Northern Spain ended in October 1937, the 2nd CCNN Division was consolidated with the 1st CCNN and renamed the XXIII de Marzo Division "Llamas Negras" ("Black Flames" in Spanish).

== World War II ==
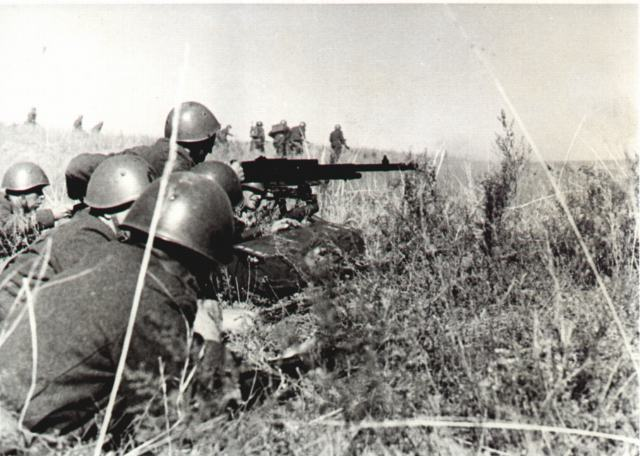
Blackshirts during Operation Barbarossa, 1941.

In 1940 the MVSN was able to muster 340,000 first-line combat troops, providing three divisions (1st, 2nd and 4th – all three of which were lost in the North African campaign) and, later in 1942, a fourth ("M") and fifth division Africa were formed.

Mussolini also pushed through plans to raise 142 MVSN combat battalions of 650 men each to provide a Gruppo di Assalto to each army division. The Gruppi consisted of two cohorts (each of three centuriae of three manipoli of two squadre each) plus Gruppo Supporto company of two heavy machine gun manipoli (with three HMG each) and two 81 mm mortar manipoli (with three mortars each).

Later forty-one mobile groups were raised to become the third regiment in Italian Army divisions as it was determined through operational experience that the Italian Army's binary divisions were too small in both manpower and heavy equipment. These mobile groups suffered heavy casualties due to being undermanned, underequipped and under-trained.

In 1941, Mussolini decided to create twenty-two highly trained combat battalions called "M" Battalions. These battalions were given the designation M alongside their names in the Army OOB to indicate their status; that they had received specialist assault and combat training, or had proven themselves in combat and had received a battlefield promotion to this status. By the end of the Fascist regime, only eleven battalions had been fully formed.

The MVSN fought in every theatre Italy did.

Sixteen MVSN combat battalions served in Yugoslavia. Their numbers were: 3, 4, 8, 16, 29, 33, 54, 58, 61, 71, 81, 85, 115, 144, 162, 215. Six of the battalions which were distinguished in combat were designated M Battalions and those were the 8th, 16th, 29th, 71st, 81st, and 85th.

== Appearance ==
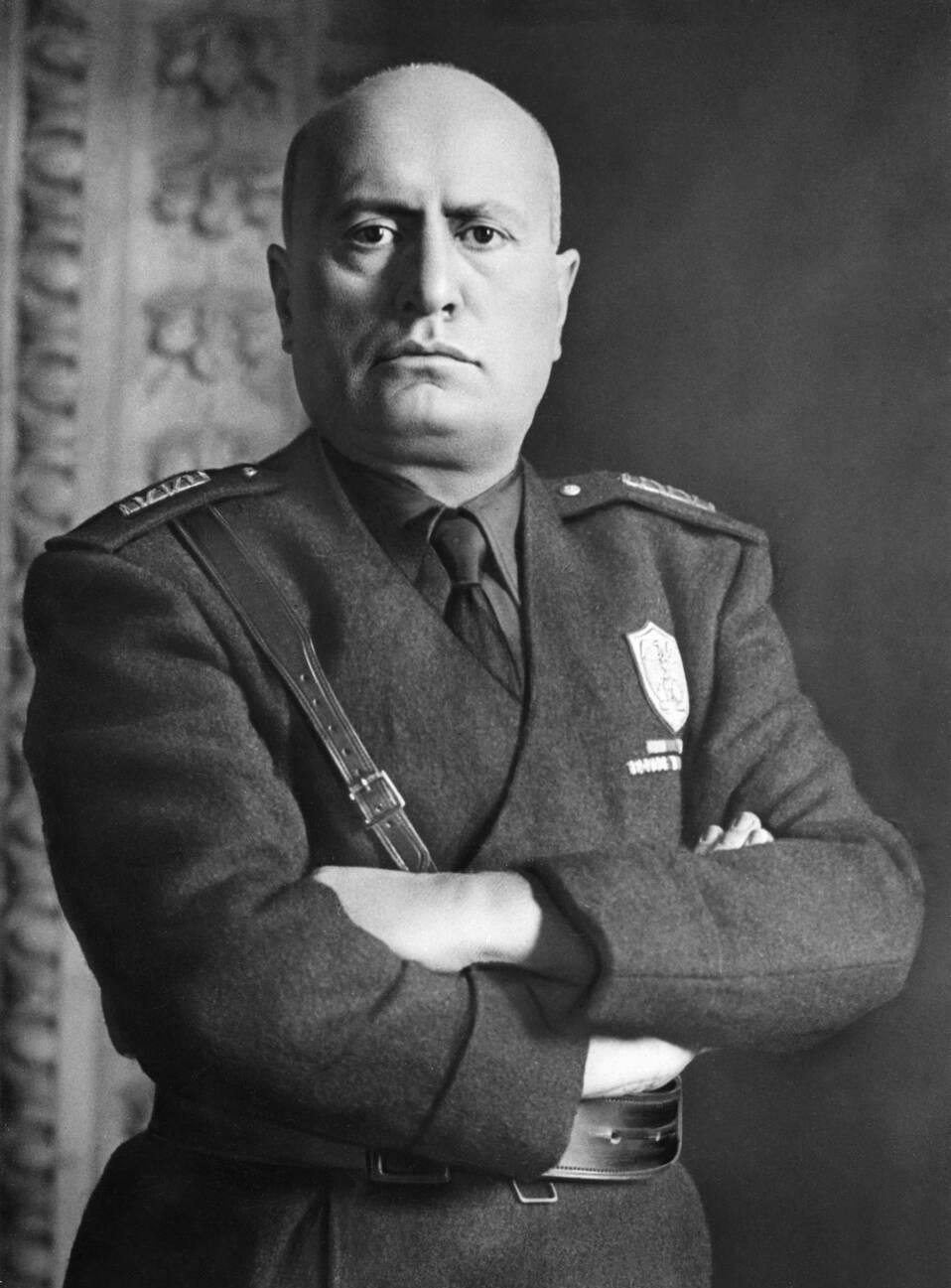
Benito Mussolini as First Honorary Corporal of the MVSN.

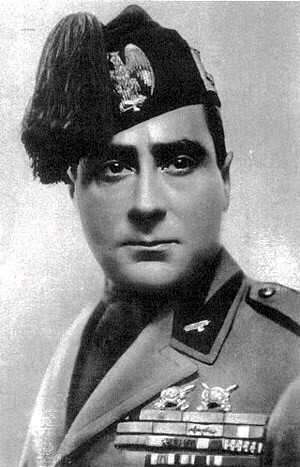
Former MVSN Chief of Staff Achille Starace wearing the black fez, black shirt and tie, and black collar flames on the tunic lapels.

The Blackshirts wore the same uniform as the Italian army with the addition of a black shirt and tie and a black fez. The uniform jacket had black flames with two ends on the collar in place of the insignia and the lictor bundles instead of the army's stars. There was an all-black dress uniform worn by some officers and the Moschettieri del Duce ("The Leader's Musketeers", Mussolini's Guard).

== Ranks ==
Mussolini as Comandante Generale was made Primo caporale onorario (transl. First honorary corporal) in 1935 and Adolf Hitler was made Caporale onorario (transl. Honorary corporal) in 1937. All other ranks closely approximated those of the old Roman army as follows.

== Legacy ==
Their ethos and sometimes their uniform were later copied by others who were influenced by Mussolini's fascism, some of which are listed below:

- Adolf Hitler, in Nazi Germany, issued brown shirts to the Sturmabteilung (Stormtroopers), who became colloquially known as Braunhemden (Brown Shirts).
- Oswald Mosley, in the United Kingdom, issued black shirts to the British Union of Fascists, who also became known as the "Blackshirts")
- Asen Kantardzhiev (Асен Кантарджиев), in Bulgaria, issued red shirts to the Sieiuziet na ratnitsite za napredieka na bielgarshchinata (Union of Soldiers for the Advancement of the Bulgarian Spirit), better known as Ratniks.
- William Dudley Pelley was the leader of the Silver Legion of America in the United States, who were known as Silver Shirts.
- Nicolás Rodríguez Carrasco headed the Spanish: Acción Revolucionaria Mexicanista (Revolutionary Mexicanist Action) in Mexico, which was better known as Camisas Doradas, or Golden Shirts. He previously founded the paramilitary group Green Shirts (Camisas Verdes), which was characterized as ultranationalist and anti-communist, although it disbanded shortly after General Abelardo Rodríguez came to power.
- Plínio Salgado lead the Brazilian Integralism movement, a paramilitary organization that issued green shirts to its members were known as the camisas verdes (Green Shirts).
- Eoin O'Duffy led the Army Comrades Association, known as the Blueshirts, in the Irish Free State.
- The American Blackshirts Movement is a white supremacist group founded in 2023 and active in the southern United States, primarily in Florida and Texas.

"Blueshirts" can also refer to Canadian fascists belonging to the Canadian National Socialist Unity Party, the Chinese Blue Shirts Society and to the members of FET y de las JONS, the only legal party within Franco's dictatorship in Spain. Additionally, both the paramilitary fascist Iron Guard members in Romania, the fascist Yugoslav Radical Union, and the successors to the Irish Blueshirts (the National Corporate Party, also founded by Eoin O'Duffy), wore green shirts.

After the Armistice of Cassibile was signed, the Blackshirts were dissolved; in the pro-fascist Italian Social Republic they were replaced by the National Republican Guard and the Black Brigades in the militia role, alongside the Republican Police Corps.

== See also ==
- Squadrismo
- Italian Social Republic
  - Black Brigades
- Black Front – Netherlands
- Black Legion, often nicknamed as the "Blackshirts" or simply "Blacks" – Croatia
- Black Shorts – parody of the Blackshirts in the writings of P. G. Wodehouse
- Blackshirts – Albania
- Guard of the Blackshirts – Carpatho-Ukraine
- Blackshirts – Finland
- Blackshirts – Iran
- Blackshirts – Netherlands
- Blackshirts – Peru
- Blackshirts – United Kingdom
  - Stewards
  - The Blackshirt
- Fascist Storm Troopers – Netherlands
- National Fascisti – United Kingdom
- Brownshirts – Nazi Germany
  - Schutzstaffel – Nazi Germany
  - Gestapo – Nazi Germany
- Blue Shirts
  - Blue Shirts – China (Kuomintang)
  - Blueshirts – Canada
  - Solidarité Française, Mouvement Franciste – France
  - Blueshirts – Ireland
  - Blueshirts – Italy
  - Blueshirts – Portugal
  - Blueshirts – Spain
  - Blueshirts – Romania
  - Blueshirts – United Kingdom
- Green Shirts
  - Greenshirts – Belgium
  - Greenshirts – Brazil
  - Greenshirts – Egypt
  - Greenshirts – France
  - Greenshirts – Hungary
  - Greenshirts – Ireland
  - Greenshirts – Romania
  - Greenshirts – Spain
  - Greenshirts – United Kingdom
  - Greenshirts – Yugoslavia
- Grey Shirts
  - Greyshirts – Iran
  - Greyshirts – Latvia
  - Greyshirts – Norway
  - Greyshirts – Sweden
  - Greyshirts – ethnically Dutch South Africans
- Red Shirts
  - Redshirts – Bulgaria
  - Redshirts – Italy
  - Redshirts – Mexico
  - Redshirts – United States
- Goldshirts – Mexico
- Ironshirts – Syria
- Silvershirts – United States
- Steelshirts – Syria
- Yellowshirts – Russia
- Whiteshirts – Brazil
- Whiteshirts – Italy
- Portuguese Legion – Portugal
- Yokusan Sonendan – Japan
- Tonton Macoute – Haiti
- Rashtriya Swayamsevak Sangh – India

=== General ===
- Militia
- Paramilitary
- Political color
- Political uniform
- Integralismo
