= 2nd CC.NN. Division "Fiamme Nere" =

- Active: January 1937 – October 1938
- Country: Kingdom of Italy
- Branch: Blackshirts
- Size: Division
- Part of: Corpo Truppe Volontarie
- Nickname: "Fiamme Nere" (Black Flames)
- Engagements: Spanish Civil War: Battle of Guadalajara; War in the North; Aragon Offensive

Commanders
- Notable commanders: Brigadier General Guido Amerigo Coppi

2nd CC.NN. Division "Fiamme Nere" ("Black Flames"), was one of the three Blackshirts Divisions sent to Spain during the Spanish Civil War to make up the "Corpo Truppe Volontarie" (Corps of Volunteer Troops), or CTV. Was strengthened after the end of the War in the North for the Aragon Offensive in 1938 with Division XXIII di Marzo and renamed XXIII Marzo Division "Fiamme Nere".

== Order of battle for the Battle of Guadalajara ==
2nd CC.NN. Division "Fiamme Nere" - Bgd. Gen. Guido Amerigo Coppi

- 6th Group of Banderas - Console Mario Pittau.
  - 651 Bandera "Ardita" - Seniore Spagnolo
  - 630 Bandera "Intrepida" - 1st Seniore Angelucci
  - 638 Bandera "Audace" - Seniore Alberto Zaccherini
  - Support Battery 65/17
  - Engineers Section
- 7th Group of Banderas - Console Marino Marino
  - 724 Bandera "Inflessibile" - Seniore Gamberini
  - 735 Bandera "Implacabile" - Seniore Bruno Calzolari
  - 740 Bandera "Disperata" - Seniore Domenico Paladino
  - Support Battery 65/17
  - Engineers Section
- 8th Grupo de Banderas - Console Fausto Vandelli
  - 530 Bandera "Inesorabile" - Seniore Fausto Vandelli
  - 730 Bandera - 1st Seniore Calzonsori
  - ? Bandera - Seniore Palezzi
  - Support Battery 65/17
  - Engineers Section
- "Carabinieri" Section
- Intendencia Section
- Sanitation Section
- Division Truck Unit
- Division Artillery - Teniente Coronel Pettinare
  - Antiaircraft Battery 20mm
  - XI Group 75/27 (3 batteries of 4 guns)
  - VIII Group 100/17 (2 batteries of 4 guns)
  - IX Group 100/17 (2 batteries of 4 guns)
  - II Group 149/12 (2 batteries of 3 guns)
  - Combat Engineers Platoon
  - Artillery Park Section

The Blackshirt (Camicie Nere, or CC.NN.) Divisions contained regular soldiers and volunteer militia from the National Fascist Party. The CC.NN. divisions were semi-motorised.

== Sources ==
- de Mesa, José Luis, El regreso de las legiones: (la ayuda militar italiana à la España nacional, 1936-1939), García Hispán, Granada:España, 1994 ISBN 84-87690-33-5
