= Emilio Battisti =

Italian general

- Born: 22 December 1889; Milan, Kingdom of Italy
- Died: 23 November 1971 (aged 81); Bologna, Italy
- Military career
- Allegiance: Kingdom of Italy; Italy
- Branch: Royal Italian Army; Italian Army
- Service years: 1910–1953
- Rank: Lieutenant General
- Commands: "Trento" Alpini Battalion; 7th Alpini Regiment "XXIII Marzo Fiamme Nere" Legionary Division; Flechas Verdes Division; 49th Infantry Division Parma; 4th Alpine Division Cuneense; 6th Territorial Military Command
- Conflicts: Italo-Turkish War; World War I; Battles of the Isonzo; White War; Second Italo-Ethiopian War; Battle of Maychew; Spanish Civil War; Aragon Offensive; World War II; Battle of the Western Alps; Greco-Italian War; Axis invasion of Yugoslavia; Italian participation in the Eastern Front; Operation Little Saturn
- Awards: Silver Medal of Military Valor (three times); Bronze Medal of Military Valor (twice); War Cross of Military Valor (twice); Military Order of Savoy; Military Order of Italy; Order of the Crown of Italy; Order of Saints Maurice and Lazarus; Order of Merit of the Italian Republic

Emilio Battisti (22 December 1889 in Milan – 23 November 1971 in Bologna) was an Italian general during World War II.

== Biography ==
He was born in Milan on 22 December 1889, the son of Silvio Battisti and Giuseppina Acconci. After enlisting in the Royal Italian Army he began to attend the Royal Academy of Infantry and Cavalry in Modena as an officer cadet, graduating in 1910 with the rank of second lieutenant in the Alpini corps. He was assigned to the "Vestone" Alpini Battalion of the 8th Alpini Regiment, and a few months later, in 1911, he left to fight in Libya during the Italo-Turkish War, earning two War Crosses for Military Valor. He remained in North Africa until 1913, when he was repatriated. During the First World War, with the rank of captain, he was commander of the 241st Company of the "Val Baltea" Alpini Battalion, under the 4th Alpini Regiment, at the head of which he conquered the Corno di Cavento on 15 June 1917. After promotion to major in October of the same year, until the end of the war he was in the "Exilles" Alpini Battalion of the 3rd Alpini Regiment. He participated in the fighting on the Mrzli, the Vodil, the Adamello, the Crozzon di Lares and the Lobbie, being decorated with a Silver (for the conquest of Corno di Cavento) and a Bronze Medal of Military Valor.

After the war he became one of the founding members of the National Alpini Association, and in 1920 he was the first commander of the newly established "Trento" Alpini Battalion, stationed in Gemona del Friuli. In January 1936, with the rank of colonel and commander of the 7th Alpini Regiment (part of the 5th Alpine Division Pusteria), he left for East Africa, where he participated in the conquest of Ethiopia. He distinguished himself in the course of war operations, being decorated with a second bronze medal for military valor for his role in the battle of Maychew, and returning to Italy in 1937.

In 1938 he volunteered to fight in the Spanish Civil War, where he assumed command, with the rank of colonel brigadier, of the "XXIII Marzo Fiamme Nere" Legionary Division of the Corps of Volunteer Troops, and then of the Flechas Verdes Division. By the end of the war, in 1939, he had been decorated with two more silver medals for military valor, and promoted to brigadier general for war merits.

With the entry of the Kingdom of Italy into World War II, which took place on 10 June 1940, he was appointed Chief of Staff of Army Group West, taking part in operations on the French front. Between 1 December 1940 and 9 March 1941 he was commander of the 49th Infantry Division Parma, fighting in the Greco-Italian War. In March 1941 he was appointed commander of the 4th Alpine Division Cuneense, also fighting on the Albanian front; on the following month the division participated in the Axis invasion of Yugoslavia, after which it was stationed in northern Albania until the spring of 1942, when it was repatriated in preparation for its transfer to the Eastern Front as part of the ARMIR.

Battisti led the "Cuneense" during the fighting on the Don river in the summer and autumn of 1942; when the Axis lines were breached by Operation Little Saturn during winter, and the ARMIR began its harrowing retreat through the steppe, he refused to be evacuated on a plane made available by the German command, choosing to share the fate of his Alpini. In the night between 26 and 27 January 1943 the divisional headquarters were encircled by Soviet troops, and after the failure of every attempt to break through, all its members were taken prisoner. The "Cuneense" was completely annihilated in the retreat, with only 1,600 men out of 17,000 being able to escape the encirclement. Battisti was initially held in a Soviet prison, where he was for some time a cellmate of German Field Marshal Friedrich Paulus, and then in a prisoner-of-war camp, for over seven years; he was only released in 1950, returning to Italy on 15 May that year, along with Generals Umberto Ricagno and Etelvoldo Pascolini and thirty South Tyrolean SS soldiers.

He then returned to service within the postwar Italian Army, with the rank of Lieutenant General; he was made commander of the 6th Territorial Military Command (Comiliter) and in 1952 he was appointed president of the Superior Council of the Armed Forces and commander of the 3rd Army Center in Bologna. He retired on 22 December 1953, becoming Honorary President for life of the Bologna-Romagna section of the ANA. He was heavily involved in ANA activities until his death in Bologna on 23 November 1971. His funeral was celebrated by military chaplain Enelio Franzoni, who had also been a prisoner in Russia and had been awarded the Gold Medal of Military Valor. In 1983 his remains were transferred to the Shrine to the fallen of the Cuneense Division, located on Colle di Nava, as he had requested in his last wish.
