= 49th Infantry Division "Parma" =

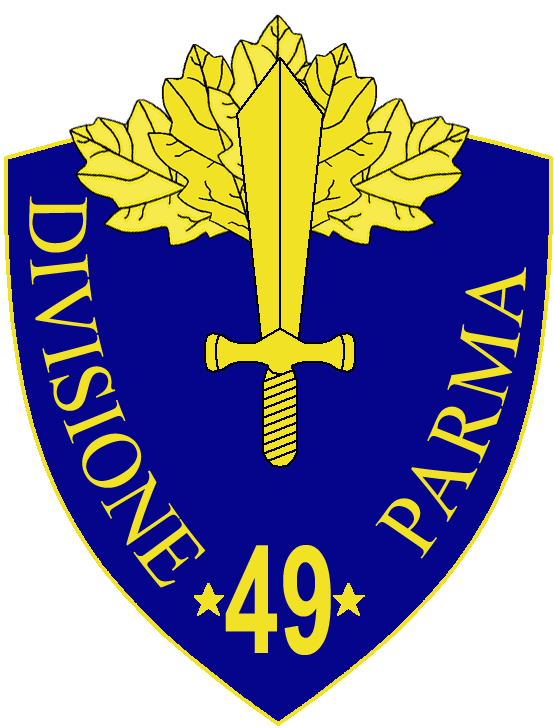
- 49th Infantry Division "Parma" insignia
- Active: 1939–1943
- Country: Kingdom of Italy
- Branch: Royal Italian Army
- Type: Infantry
- Size: Division
- Garrison/HQ: Macerata
- Engagements: World War II

Commanders
- Notable commanders: Gen. B. Emilio Battisti

Insignia
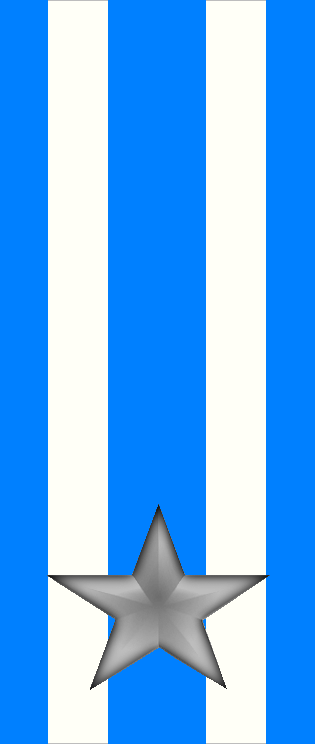
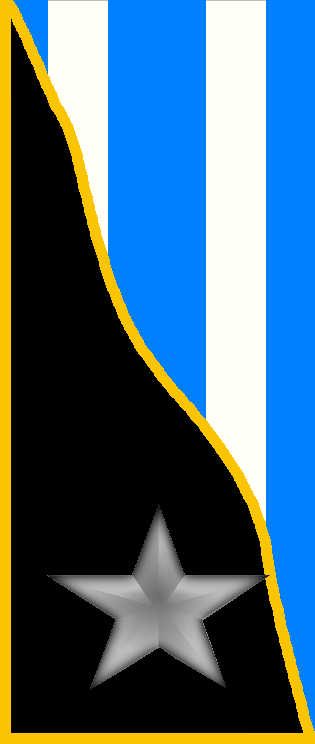
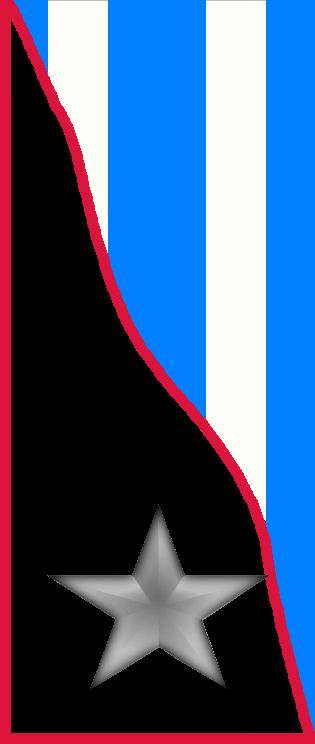
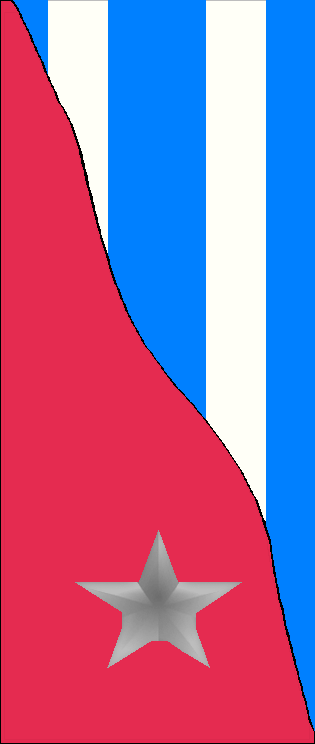
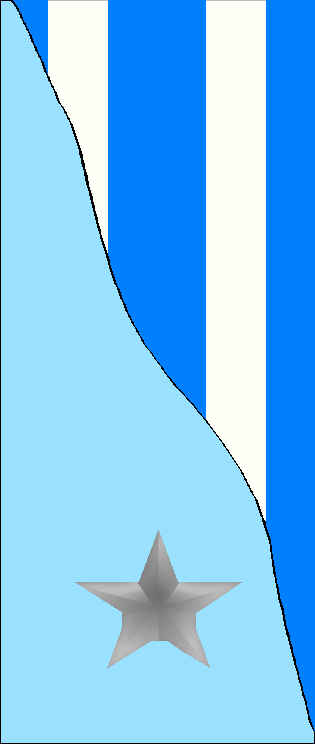
- Identification symbol: Parma Division gorget patches

The 49th Infantry Division "Parma" (Italian: 49ª Divisione di fanteria "Parma") was an infantry division of the Royal Italian Army during World War II. The Parma was activated on 12 September 1939 in Macerata and named for the city of Parma. After the announcement of the Armistice of Cassibile on 8 September 1943 the division was disbanded by German forces in Vlorë in Albania.

== History ==
The division's lineage begins with the Brigade "Parma" established on 17 October 1859 with the 5th and 6th infantry regiments of the Army of the United Provinces of Central Italy. On 25 March 1860 the Brigade "Parma" entered the Royal Sardinian Army three days after the Kingdom of Sardinia had annexed the United Provinces of Central Italy. Already before entering the Royal Sardinian Army the brigade's two infantry regiments had been renumbered on 30 December 1859 as 49th Infantry Regiment and 50th Infantry Regiment.

=== World War I ===
The brigade fought on the Italian front in World War I. On 31 December 1926 the brigade command was disbanded and its two regiments assigned to other brigades: the 49th Infantry Regiment "Parma" was assigned to the IX Infantry Brigade and the 50th Infantry Regiment "Parma" was assigned to the VII Infantry Brigade. On 12 September 1939 the 49th Infantry Division "Parma" was activated Macerata and received its two namesake infantry regiments and the newly raised 49th Artillery Regiment "Parma". The Parma was housed partially in the barracks of the 53rd Infantry Division "Arezzo", which had been transferred to Albania in June 1940.

=== World War II ===
On 10 June 1940 Italy entered World War II by invading France. The Parma remained at Macerata until October 1940 when it was sent to Albania for the upcoming Greco-Italian War. At the outbreak of the war on 28 October 1940 the Parma was deployed on the Greco-Albanian border to the south of Lake Prespa, from Maja e Kallogjerit to Dobranj, being the part of XXVI Army Corps. On 30 October 1940 Greek attacks forced the Parma to retreat from the upper Devoll river valley and on 31 October 1940 the division had to abandon the town of Bitinckë and villages of Tren and Vërnik. On 1 November 1940 the Parma repelled a Greek attack on Ponçarë and on 2 November 1940 an attack on a mountaintop position on the division's southern flank. While Ponçarë was orderly evacuated on 3 November 1940, the Greek breakthrough at Maja e Kallogjerit the same day resulted in the loss of Cerjë town and the crumbling of Italian defences on the Devoll river. From 6 November the Greek forces started to exploit their breakthrough, clashing with Italians at Bilisht first. On 14 November 1940 heavy clashes were recorded at Menkulas and Koshnicë, on 15 November 1940 at Gjyras, on 16 November at Drenovë to the south of Korçë. From 17 to 19 November 1940 fierce fighting raged at the mountain pass leading to Boboshticë. The pass changed hands several times. On 21 November 1940 the Parma was relieved from front line duties and replaced by 2nd Alpine Division "Tridentina".

On 12 December 1940 the Parma returned to the front line in the sector of Mjetë - Mëlovë - Maja e Kulmakës. Immediately the Greek pushed an attack at Mëlovë and then Zaloshnjë. The Parma retreated in good order down the Tomorrica river valley, managing to stop the Greek advance on 15 December 1940. Further strong Greek attacks on 30–31 December 1940 forced the Parma to retreat to the Lemnushë - Mal Tomor line. The initiative then passed to the Parma, which managed to capture and hold Dobrenjë on 24 January 1941. While the Parma secured mountaintop positions, the Italian assault through the valley between Dobrenjë and the Tomorrica river bogged down and stalled. With the start of Battle of Greece and the Greek retreat the Parma advanced to Mali i Kulmakës on 14 April 1941, at which point the contact with the retreating Greek army was lost. To catch up, the Parma moved on 15 April 1941 to the Osum valley near Këlcyrë. By 19 April 1941 the division was in firm control of the Korçë-Ersekë railway. After overcoming some Greek resistance at Ikinas and Borovë, the Parma reached the Greek-Albanian border at Perati on 30 April 1941.

After the war's end the Parma remained in Albania on anti-partisan and coastal defence duties in the Tepelenë-Gjirokastër-Himarë-Vlorë region. While the Parma was on occupation duty in Albania the division's regimental depots in Italy raised in September 1941 the 152nd Infantry Division "Piceno": the depot of the 49th Infantry Regiment "Parma" raised the 235th Infantry Regiment "Piceno", the depot of the 50th Infantry Regiment "Parma" raised the 236th Infantry Regiment "Piceno", and the depot of the 47th Artillery Regiment "Parma" raised the 152nd Artillery Regiment "Piceno". In November 1941 the depot of the 50th Infantry Regiment "Parma" also raised the 313th Infantry Regiment "Pinerolo" for the 24th Infantry Division "Pinerolo".

After the announcement of the Armistice of Cassibile on 8 September 1943 the bulk of the division was disbanded by German forces near Vlorë in Albania, while the command of the 49th Infantry Regiment "Parma" and the regiment's I Battalion were in the process of being shipped to Corfu. There the I Battalion, together with the 18th Infantry Regiment "Acqui" from the 33rd Infantry Division "Acqui" resisted German forces until 25 September 1943. After the Italian surrender on Corfu the Germans executed the officers of the two regiments.

The II Battalion of 49th Infantry Regiment "Parma" refused the German order to surrender and joined the 151st Infantry Division "Perugia" on its march to Sarandë. There the Perugia and the II Battalion resisted German forces until 5 October 1943. After the Italian surrender in Sarandë the Germans executed all captured Italian officers.

== Organization ==
49th Infantry Division "Parma" organization in 1940

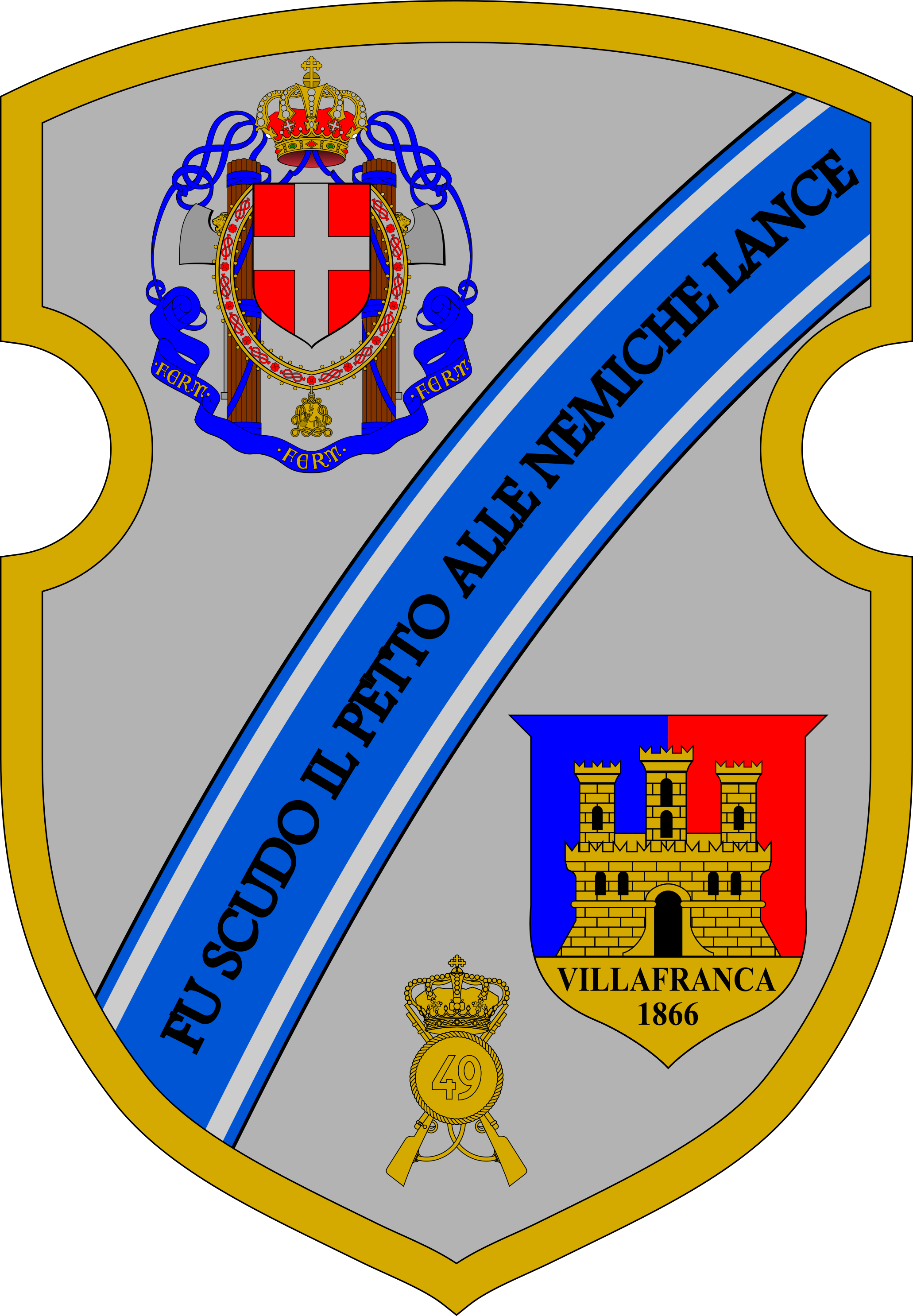
Coat of Arms of the 49th Infantry Regiment "Parma", 1939

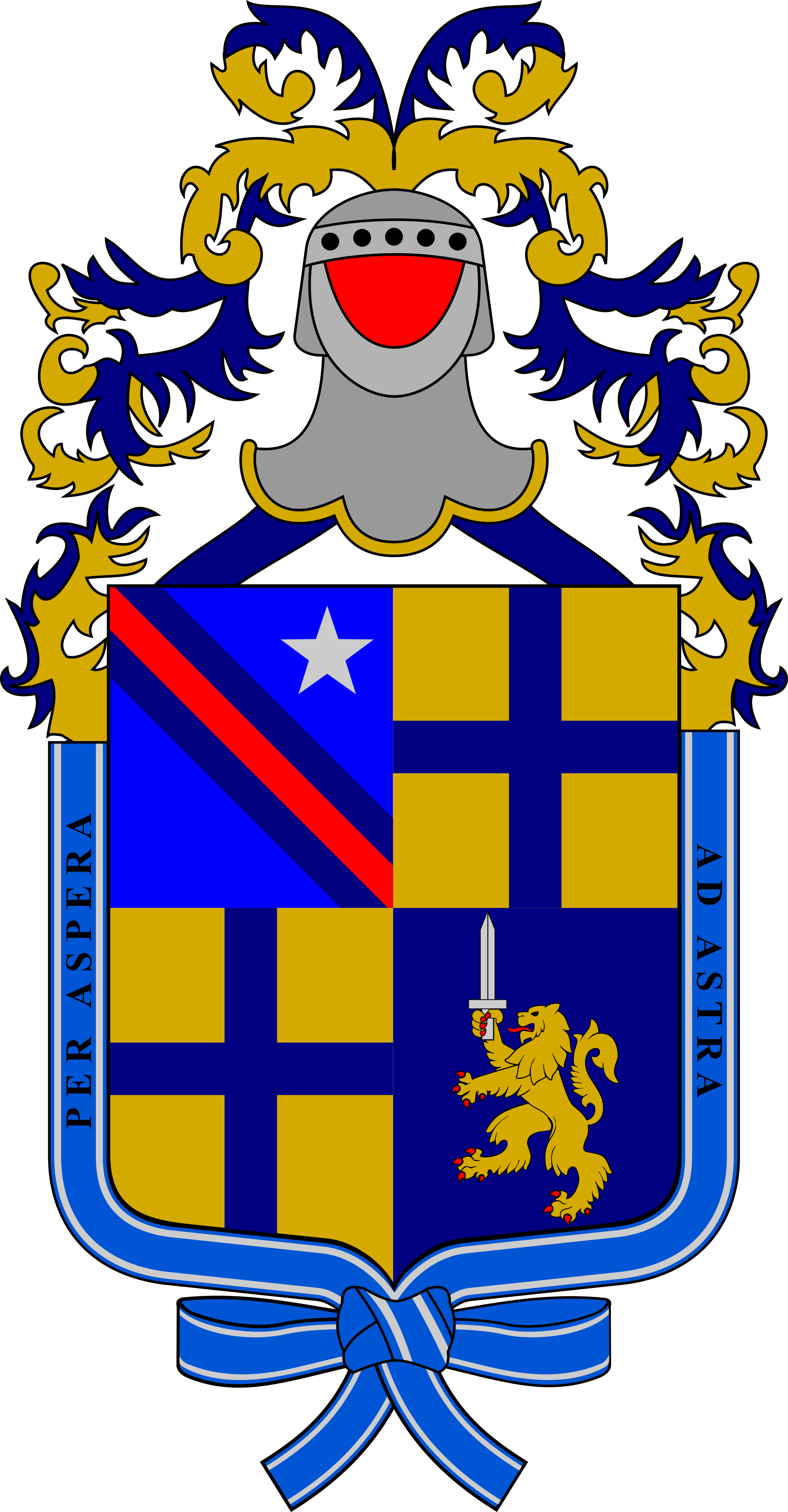
Coat of Arms of the 50th Infantry Regiment "Parma", 1939

- 49th Infantry Division "Parma", in Macerata
  - Headquarters
    - Command Company
    - 88th Carabinieri Section
    - 89th Carabinieri Section
    - 101st Field Post Office
    - 49th Infantry Division Command Transport Squad
  - 49th Infantry Regiment "Parma", in Ascoli Piceno
    - Command Company
    - I Fusilier Battalion (transferred to Corfu in September 1943)
    - II Fusilier Battalion (joined the 151st Infantry Division "Perugia" in September 1943)
    - III Fusilier Battalion
    - Support Weapons Battery (65/17 mod. 13 infantry support guns)
    - Mortar Company (81mm mod. 35 mortars)
  - 50th Infantry Regiment "Parma", in Macerata
    - Command Company
    - 3 × Fusilier battalions
    - Support Weapons Battery (65/17 mod. 13 infantry support guns)
    - Mortar Company (81mm mod. 35 mortars)
  - 49th Artillery Regiment "Parma", in Teramo
    - Command Unit
    - I Group (100/17 mod. 14 howitzers; transferred from the 23rd Artillery Regiment "Re")
    - II Group (75/27 mod. 11 field guns; transferred from the 2nd Artillery Regiment "Messina"; transferred on 7 September 1940 to the 11th Artillery Regiment "Ravenna")
    - II Group (75/13 mod. 15 mountain guns; transferred on 7 September 1940 from the 11th Artillery Regiment "Ravenna")
    - III Group (75/13 mod. 15 mountain guns)
    - 1 × Anti-aircraft battery (20/65 mod. 35 anti-aircraft guns)
    - Ammunition and Supply Unit
  - XLIX Mortar Battalion (81mm mod. 35 mortars)
  - 49th Anti-tank Company (47/32 mod. 35 anti-tank guns)
  - 49th Engineer Company
  - 49th Telegraph and Radio Operators Company
  - 62nd Medical Section
  - 85th Supply Section
  - 49th Autocarrette Section
  - 849th Transport Section

Attached to the division from 1941 to early 1942:

- 109th CC.NN. Legion "Corridoni"
  - CIX CC.NN. Battalion (remained attached to the division until September 1943)
  - CXVI CC.NN. Battalion
  - 109th CC.NN. Machine Gun Company

Attached to the division in 1943:

- 2nd Regiment "Cacciatori d'Albania"
  - Battalion "Tomori"
  - Battalion "Tarabosh"
  - Machine Gun Company
  - Support Weapons Company (47/32 mod. 35 anti-tank guns)

== Commanding officers ==
The division's commanding officers were:

- Generale di Divisione Attilio Grattarola (12 September 1939 - 29 November 1940)
- Generale di Brigata Emilio Battisti (30 November 1940 - 9 March 1941)
- Generale di Brigata Ugo Adami (10 March 1941 - 20 August 1941)
- Generale di Brigata Paolo Micheletti (21 August 1942 - 21 April 1942)
- Colonel Antonio Sugliano (acting, 22 April - 20 May 1942)
- Generale di Brigata Paolo Micheletti (21 May 1942 - 28 February 1943)
- Generale di Brigata Luigi Podio (1 March 1943 - July 1943)
- Generale di Brigata Ezio Vegni (acting, July - 9 August 1943)
- Generale di Brigata Enrico Lugli (acting, 10 August - 10 September 1943)
