= Francesco La Ferla =

Italian general

- Born: 2 April 1886; Monreale, Kingdom of Italy
- Died: 22 March 1962 (aged 75); Palermo, Italy
- Military career
- Allegiance: Kingdom of Italy; Italy
- Branch: Royal Italian Army; Italian Army
- Service years: 1907–1952
- Rank: Lieutenant General
- Commands: 37th Infantry Regiment "Ravenna"; Flechas Azules Division; Bologna Military Zone; Palermo Military Zone; 211th Coastal Division; 101st Motorised Division Trieste
- Conflicts: Italo-Turkish War; World War I; Spanish Civil War; Catalonia Offensive; World War II; Battle of Alam Halfa; Second battle of El Alamein; Tunisian campaign
- Awards: Bronze Medal of Military Valour; Military Order of Italy; Maurician Medal

Francesco La Ferla (2 April 1886 – 22 March 1962) was an Italian general during World War II.

== Biography ==
He enlisted in the Royal Italian Army in 1907, after obtaining a degree in law in Palermo, and attended the Military Academy of Modena, graduating on 17 September 1910 with the rank of second lieutenant, assigned to the 8th Bersaglieri Regiment in Palermo. He participated in the Italo-Turkish War with the rank of lieutenant, being awarded a Bronze Medal of Military Valour, and subsequently in the First World War with the rank of captain and later major, being further decorated.

After serving as a staff officer, he was promoted to colonel on August 17, 1935, first assuming command of the 37th Infantry Regiment "Ravenna" in 1935–1936, and then commanding the Flechas Azules Division during the Spanish Civil War (1937-1938). In 1939 he was assigned to the headquarters of the XII Corps in Palermo, and on 1 July 1940 he was promoted to brigadier general and briefly given command of the Bologna Military Zone (from August to September) and then of the Palermo Military Zone (from September 1940 to August 1941). On 12 August 1941 he was given command of the divisional infantry of the 151st Infantry Division Perugia, stationed in its eponymous city. On 15 November 1941 he assumed command of the newly established 211th Coastal Division with headquarters in Cittanova, where he remained until July 17, 1942.

On 30 July 1942 he replaced General Arnaldo Azzi at the command of the 101st Motorised Division Trieste, deployed in Egypt near El Alamein. Most of the division was destroyed during the second battle of El Alamein in October–November 1942, after which La Ferla withdrew to Tunisia with the remnants of his division. On 26 April 1943 he was promoted to major general, and on 13 May 1943, with the final Axis surrender in Tunisia, he was taken prisoner by the British and sent to Great Britain. Following the Armistice of Cassibile, he was released and allowed to return to Italy in June 1944, where he was placed at the disposal of the Ministry of War in Rome for special assignments.

He remained in the Army after the end of the war and the establishment of the Italian Republic, and in 1952 he was promoted to lieutenant general and awarded the Knight's Cross of the Military Order of Italy and the Maurician Medal for his fifty-year career. After retiring from the Army he became honorary president of the Palermo section of the National Bersaglieri Association. He died in Palermo in 1962.
