= Flechas Negras Mixed Brigade =

In 1937, during the Spanish Civil War, Italians from the Corpo Truppe Volontarie began to serve in mixed Italo-Spanish Flechas (Arrows) units where the Italians provided the officers and technical personnel, while the Spanish served in the rank-and-file. One, the Flechas Negras Mixed Brigade "Black Arrows" first served in Vizcaya from April 1937.

== Order of Battle, April 1937 ==
Flechas Negras Brigade - Col. Sandro Piazzoni

- 3rd Regiment
  - 1st Battalion
  - 2nd Battalion
  - 3rd Battalion
  - Battery 65/17
- 4th Regiment
  - 1st Battalion
  - 2nd Battalion
  - 3rd Battalion
  - Battery 65/17
- Assault Battalion
  - 1st Company
  - 2nd Company
- Artillery Group
  - IVº Grupo de 75/27
  - Grupo de 100/17
  - Grupo de 105/28
  - Battery 20mm AA
- Engineer Company
- Intendencia Section
- Sanitation Section

== Order of Battle, Battle of Santander August 1937 ==
Flechas Negras Brigade - Col. Sandro Piazzoni

- 3rd Regiment
  - 1st Battalion "Monte Jata"
  - 2nd Battalion "Bermeo"
  - 3rd Battalion "Munguia"
  - Battery 65/17
  - Engineer Section
- 4th Regiment
  - 1st Battalion "Peña Amarilla"
  - 2nd Battalion
  - 3rd Battalion "Algorta"
  - Battery 65/17
  - Engineer Section
- Assault Battalion
- Artillery Group
  - Group 75/27
  - Battery 149/12
  - Antitank Battery 37mm
  - Battery 20mm AA
- Engineer Company
- Division Truck Unit

The Flechas Negras Brigade was later expanded to form the Flechas Division.

== See also ==
- Flechas Azules Mixed Brigade

== Sources ==
- de Mesa, José Luis, El regreso de las legiones: (la ayuda militar italiana a la España nacional, 1936–1939), García Hispán, Granada:España, 1994 ISBN 84-87690-33-5
