= Attilio Grattarola =

Italian general

- Born: 26 April 1882; Lu Monferrato, Kingdom of Italy
- Died: 8 October 1966 (aged 84)
- Military career
- Allegiance: Kingdom of Italy
- Branch: Royal Italian Army
- Rank: Major General
- Commands: 43rd Infantry Regiment "Forlì" "Peloritana II" Infantry Brigade; 49th Infantry Division "Parma"; Territorial Defense Command of Turin; Territorial Defense Command of Alessandria
- Conflicts: World War I; Battles of the Isonzo; World War II; Greco-Italian War
- Awards: Silver Medal of Military Valor; Order of the Crown of Italy

Attilio Grattarola (Lu Monferrato, 26 April 1882 – 8 October 1966) was an Italian general during World War II.

== Biography ==
He was born in Lu Monferrato on 26 April 1882, and after enlisting in the Royal Italian Army as a trainee sergeant, in 1904 he was admitted to attend the Royal Military Academy of Infantry and Cavalry in Modena, from which he graduated in 1907 with the rank of infantry second lieutenant. He took part in the Great War as a lieutenant and captain, earning a Silver Medal of Military Valor during the First Battle of the Isonzo, and in 1917 he was transferred to the General Staff, being promoted to major and then lieutenant colonel by 1918.

On 1 July 1931 he was promoted to colonel, he was commander of the 43rd Infantry Regiment "Forlì" between 1932 and 1934, and then in service at the Infantry Inspectorate, Experiments Section, in Rome between 1934 and 1937. In 1936 he commanded the "Peloritana II" Infantry Brigade. On 1 July 1937 he was promoted to brigadier general, becoming deputy commander of the 28th Infantry Division "Aosta" in Palermo and then, from 1 September 1939, at the disposal of the Army Corps of Palermo for special assignments, remaining there until early 1940. On January 1 of that year he was promoted to major general, subsequently assuming command of the 49th Infantry Division "Parma".

When the Kingdom of Italy entered the Second World War on 10 June 1940, he was in command of the Division, stationed in Marzabotto (province of Bologna). In September, the "Parma" Division was transferred to Albania where on October 28, at the beginning of the operations against Greece, it was deployed along the border, south of Lake Prespa, holding the Mount Kallogjerit-Dobran-Nicolika sector. When the Greek Army counterattacked after repelling the initial Italian invasion, on 30 October the "Parma" Division abandoned the border positions of Gijnkove and the upper Devoll valley; more border villages, including Bitinka, Trevi and Vernik, fell into Greek hands on October 31 and November 1 and 2, while a dangerous drive to Poncari and, further south, an attempt to circumvent Mount Eidos was checked. Grattarola was held responsible for these setbacks, relieved of command on November 29 (replaced by General Emilio Battisti) and repatriated.

He never obtained an operational command again, being assigned to the territorial defense, first commanding the I Territorial Defense Command of Turin and then to the II Command of Alessandria. After the armistice of Cassibile he rejected requests by the local anti-fascists to be armed to fight the Germans alongside the Allies, and on 9 September 1943 he was captured by the Germans in Alessandria; he was then interned in Oflag 64/Z in Schokken, in Poland, where he remained until 26 January 1945, when he was freed by the advancing Soviet Army and later repatriated. He died on 8 October 1966.
