= Lugli =

Lugli (pronounced [ˈluʎʎi]) is an Italian surname from Emilia and Mantua, originally referring to someone born in the month of July (Italian: luglio). Notable people with the surname include:

- Albano Lugli (1834–1914), Italian painter and ceramic artist
- Enrico Lugli (1889–1967), Italian general during World War II
- Gino Lugli Munaron (1928–2009), Italian racing driver
- Giuseppe Lugli (1890–1967), Italian Classical archaeologist, Roman topographer and academic
- Nicolás Lugli (born 1996), Argentine footballer

== See also ==
- Luglio
