= 41st Infantry Division "Firenze" =

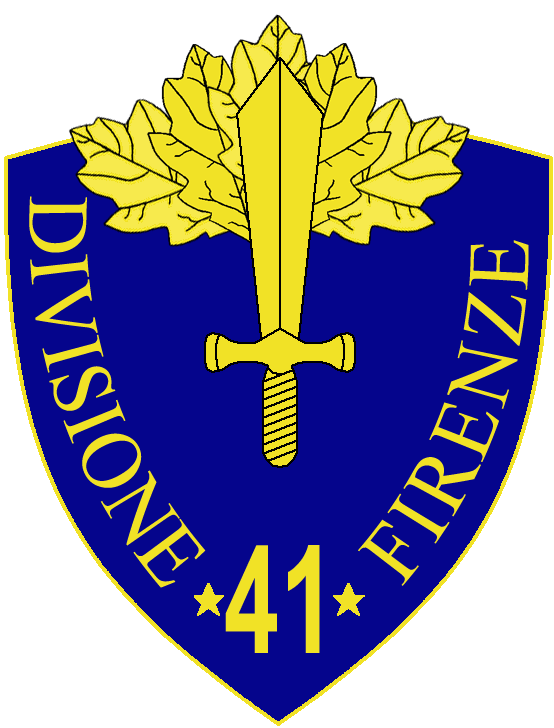
- 41st Infantry Division "Firenze" insignia
- Active: 15 September 1939–28 September 1943
- Country: Kingdom of Italy
- Branch: Royal Italian Army
- Type: Infantry
- Size: Division
- Garrison/HQ: Florence
- Engagements: World War II; Italian invasion of France; Invasion of Yugoslavia

Insignia
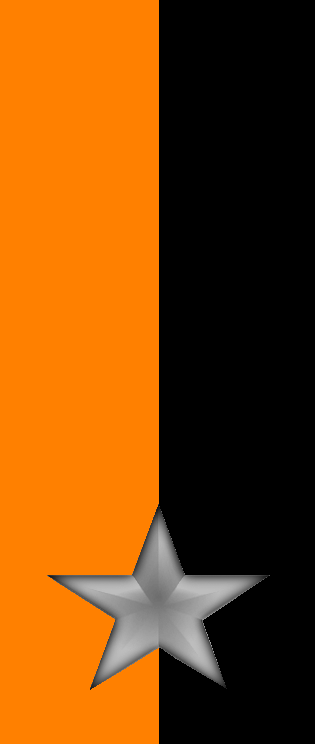
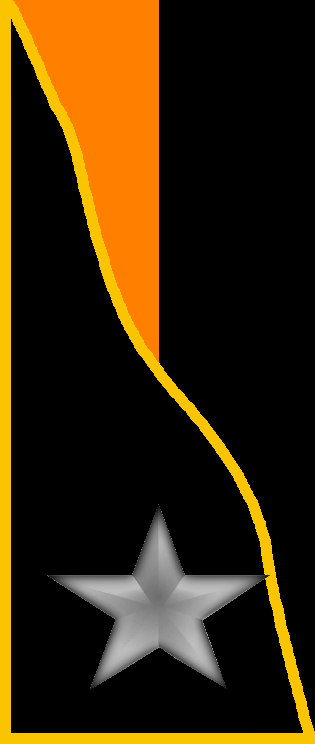
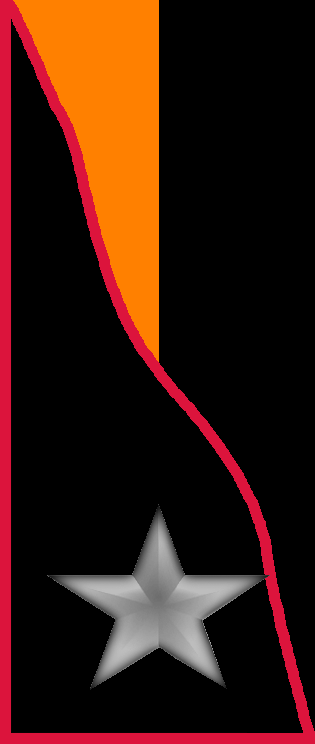
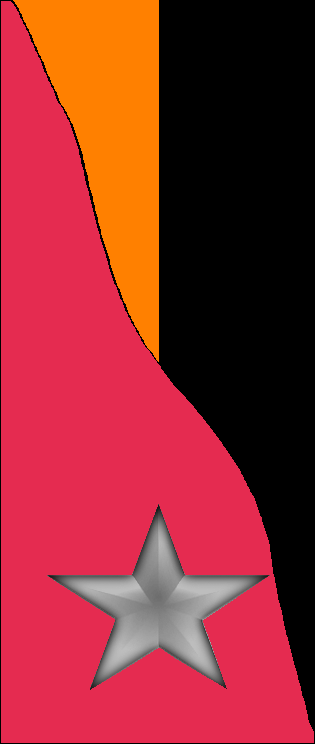
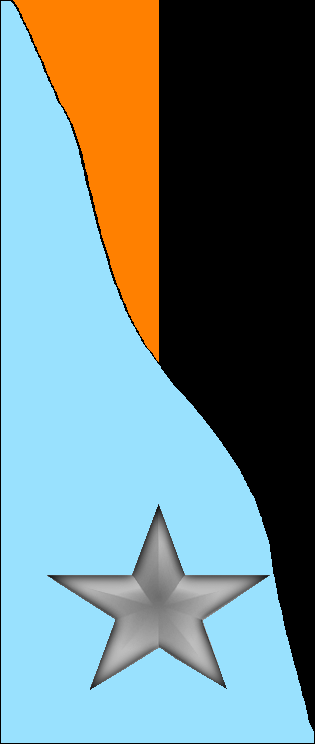
- Identification symbol: Firenze Division gorget patches

The 41st Infantry Division "Firenze" (Italian: 41ª Divisione di fanteria "Firenze") was an infantry division of the Royal Italian Army during World War II. The Firenze was formed on 15 September 1939 in Florence (Italian: Firenze) and named for the city. The division recruited primarily in Tuscany. After the announcement of the Armistice of Cassibile on 8 September 1943 the division resisted German attempts to disbanded it and on 28 September 1943 the division dissolved itself and formed partisan formations, which joined the Albanian National Liberation Army.

== History ==
=== World War I ===
The division's lineage begins with the Brigade "Firenze" established in Florence in March 1915 in preparation for Italy's entry in World War I. The brigade consisted of the 127th and 128th infantry regiments and fought on the Italian front. After the war the brigade was disbanded in February 1920.

On 15 September 1939 the 41st Infantry Division "Firenze" was activated in Florence and received its two reactivated namesake infantry regiments and the newly raised 41st Artillery Regiment "Firenze". The division's units were raised by the regimental depots of the 19th Infantry Division "Venezia", which had been transferred to Albania in spring 1939.

=== World War II ===
On 7 June 1940 the Firenze division moved from Tuscany to Piedmont, as part of the reserve for the planned Italian invasion of France. The division assembled in Carmagnola, Poirino, Villanova d'Asti and was not engaged in the invasion of France.

In preparation for the Invasion of Yugoslavia the division moved in March 1941 to Albania. On 27 March 1941 the Firenze assembled north-west of Lake Ohrid near Librazhd. On 1 April 1941 the division moved to the border with Yugoslavia to the North of Stëblevë. The division was assigned to cover the right flank of the planned advance through the Rapuni river valley and therefore the Firenze prepared defensive positions around the Shkumbin river valley.

On 8 April 1941 Yugoslav forces tried to attack a mountaintop position of the division at Mali i Gjinovecit. On 9 April 1941 the Firenze counter-attacked to the North and South of the Dibër plain and captured the Vogël pass by evening. With the part of the Yugoslav forces surrounded, detachments of the Firenze advanced to the Black Drin river bridge and encountered heavy resistance on the way. By 11 April 1941 the Yugoslav forces in the Dibër plain were eliminated with the fall of Shupenzë. Subsequently, the Firenze advanced South and captured Maqellarë and Debar on 12 April 1941, without encountering much resistance. On 14 April 1941 the division started to prepare defensive positions at Kovashicë, Stushaj, and Bllacë. The same day German forces advancing from Gostivar and Kičevo linked up with the Firenze, ending the fighting.

The Firenze remained in Macedonia and Montenegro as occupation force, establishing initially garrisons at Debar, Struga, Izvor and Volko Legalo. Starting from July 1941, the division was split in numerous detachments for road patrols and small garrisons. By January 1943 the Firenze's units were operating mostly in Gostivar, Peshkopi, Burrel, Debar, Struga, Mogorče, Elbasan, Librazhd and Qukës.

Following the announcement of the Armistice of Cassibile on 8 September 1943 the Firenze attempted to gather its units and retreat from Macedonia to Albania. The re-assembled division under General Arnaldo Azzi moved to Krujë in Albania via the mountain pass of Qafa e Shtamës. In Krujë the Firenze was opposed by German units and skirmished with Albanian partisans. Unable to proceed to the coast the Firenze retreated to Qafa e Shtamës and started negotiations with the Yugoslav partisans. After coming to an agreement with the Yugoslav partisans the division joined the Albanian National Liberation Army. On 28 September 1943 the Firenze was split into four brigade-sized Military Zone Commands, which operated alongside Yugoslav and Albanian partisans in the area from Qafa e Shtamës to Debar.

== Organization ==
41st Infantry Division "Firenze" organization in 1940

- 41st Infantry Division "Firenze", in Florence
  - Headquarters
    - Command Company
    - 132nd Carabinieri Section
    - 133rd Carabinieri Section
    - 68th Field Post Office
    - 41st Infantry Division Command Transport Squad
  - 127th Infantry Regiment "Firenze", in Pistoia
    - Command Company
    - 3 × Fusilier battalions
    - Support Weapons Battery (65/17 mod. 13 infantry support guns)
    - Mortar Company (81mm Mod. 35 mortars)
  - 128th Infantry Regiment "Firenze", in Florence
    - Command Company
    - 3 × Fusilier battalions
    - Support Weapons Battery (65/17 mod. 13 infantry support guns)
    - Mortar Company (81mm Mod. 35 mortars)
  - 41st Artillery Regiment "Firenze", in Florence
    - Command Unit
    - I Group (100/17 mod. 14 howitzers)
    - II Group (75/27 Mod. 11 field guns; transferred on 31 August 1943 to the 53rd Artillery Regiment "Arezzo")
    - II Group (75/13 mod. 15 mountain guns; transferred on 31 August 1943 from the 53rd Artillery Regiment "Arezzo")
    - III Group (75/18 mod. 34 mountain guns; transferred on 1 December 1940 to the 27th Artillery Regiment "Cuneo")
    - III Group (75/27 mod. 11 field guns; transferred on 1 December 1940 from the 27th Artillery Regiment "Cuneo"; transferred in April 1941 to the 35th Artillery Regiment "Friuli")
    - III Group (75/13 mod. 15 mountain guns; transferred in April 1941 from the 35th Artillery Regiment "Friuli")
    - 1 × Anti-aircraft battery (20/65 Mod. 35 anti-aircraft guns)
    - Ammunition and Supply Unit
  - XLI Mortar Battalion (81mm Mod. 35 mortars)
  - XLI Machine Gun Battalion (joined the division in 1943)
  - XLI Mixed Engineer Battalion (formed in 1943)
  - CXXVII Replacements Battalion (joined the division in Yugoslavia)
  - CXXVIII Replacements Battalion (joined the division in Yugoslavia)
  - 41st Anti-tank Company (47/32 mod. 35 anti-tank guns; replaced by the 241st Anti-tank Company in 1943)
  - 41st Telegraph and Radio Operators Company (entered the XLI Mixed Engineer Battalion in 1943)
  - 53rd Engineer Company (entered the XLI Mixed Engineer Battalion in 1943)
  - 37th Medical Section
  - 36th Supply Section
  - 41st Autocarrette Section
  - 194th Transport Section (joined the division in 1943)
  - 841st Transport Section

Attached to the division from 1941:

- 92nd CC.NN. Legion "Ferrucci" (sided with the Germans after the announcement of the Armistice of Cassibile on 8 September 1943)
  - XCII CC.NN. Battalion
  - XCV CC.NN. Battalion
  - 152nd CC.NN. Machine Gun Company

== Commanding officers ==
The division's commanding officers were:

- Generale di Divisione Paride Negri (15 September 1939 - 8 June 1941)
- Generale di Brigata Guido Boselli (9 June 1941 - 30 September 1942)
- Colonel Salvatore D'Agostino (acting, 1-22 October 1942)
- Generale di Brigata Guido Boselli (23-24 October 1942)
- Colonel Salvatore D'Agostino (acting, 25 October - 24 November 1942)
- Colonel Gino Piccini (acting, 25-29 November 1942)
- Generale di Divisione Arnaldo Azzi (30 November 1942 - 28 September 1943)
