= Flechas Negras Division =

Flechas Negras Division was a division of the Nationalist forces during the Spanish Civil War. The name means "Black Arrows" in Spanish.

It was a Blackshirts division created when the Flechas Division was further strengthened with support units and renamed. It served in the Catalonia Offensive, the final offensive of the Spanish Civil War. Italians from the Corpo Truppe Volontarie served in these mixed Italo-Spanish Flechas (Arrows) units where the Italians provided the officers and technical personnel, while the Spanish served in the rank-and-file.

== Order of battle ==
Flechas Negras Division - Col. Valentino Babini

- 1st Regiment
  - 1st Battalion "Monte Jata"
  - 2nd Battalion "Bermeo"
  - 3rd Battalion "Munguia"
  - Battery of 65/17
- 2nd Regiment
  - 1st Battalion "Peña Amarilla"
  - 2nd Battalion "Santoña"
  - 3rd Battalion "Algorta"
  - Battery of 65/17
- Fusilier Battalion "Laredo"
- Independent Fusilier Battalion
- Battalion de maquinas
  - 1st Machinegun Company
  - 2nd Machinegun Company
  - 3rd Machinegun Company
  - 4th Mortar Company
- Auto Company
- Artillery Regiment
  - Group of 65/17
  - Group of 75/27 "Vizcaya"
  - Group of 100/17
  - 20mm Battery
- Engineer Battalion
- Logistics Company

== See also ==
- Flechas Azules Division
- Flechas Verdes Division

== Sources ==
- de Mesa, José Luis, El regreso de las legiones: (la ayuda militar italiana a la España nacional, 1936–1939), García Hispán, Granada:España, 1994 ISBN 84-87690-33-5
