= VI Army Corps (Italy) =

The VI Corps (Italian: VI Corpo d'Armata) was a corps of the Royal Italian Army during World War II that participated in the invasion of Yugoslavia.

After the capitulation of Yugoslavia, the VI Army Corps was relocated to Dalmatia and Croatia. Here they occupied the Governorate of Dalmatia and the Italian influence zone in the Independent State of Croatia. Units of the Corps took part from 9 October to 9 November 1941 in a vast anti-partisan action on the Serbo-Croatian border.

== Commanders ==
- General Luigi Capello (1915-1916)
- General Stefano Lombardi (1917.09.23 - 1919.01.21)
- Army Corps General Ezio Rosi (1940.06.10 - 1940.11.08)
- Army Corps General Renzo Dalmazzo (1940.11.09 – 1942.10.01)
- Army Corps General Ugo Santovito (1942.09.24 – 1943.01.04)
- Army Corps General Paride Negri (1943.01.05 – 1943.02.28)
- Army Corps General Alessandro Piazzoni (1943.03.01 – 1943.09.12)
