= 154th Infantry Division "Murge" =

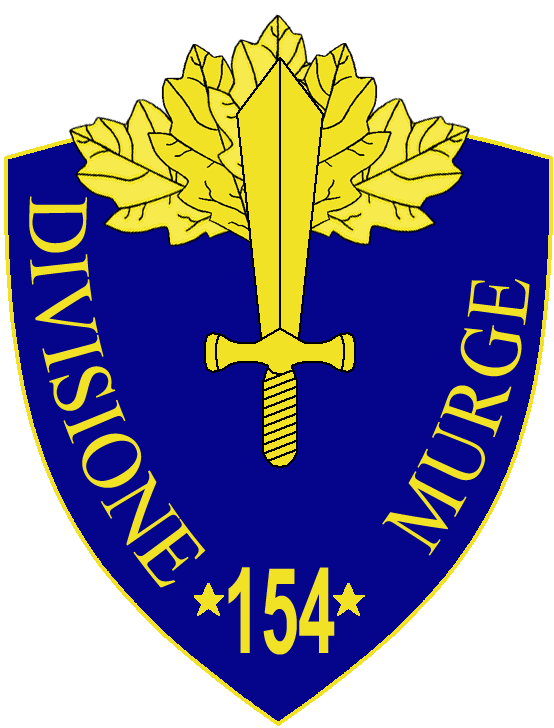
- 154th Infantry Division "Murge" insignia
- Active: 1 December 1941– 14 September 1943
- Country: Kingdom of Italy
- Branch: Royal Italian Army
- Type: Infantry
- Size: Division
- Engagements: World War II

Insignia
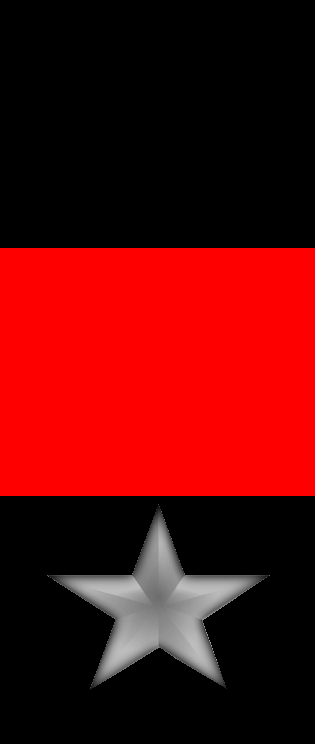
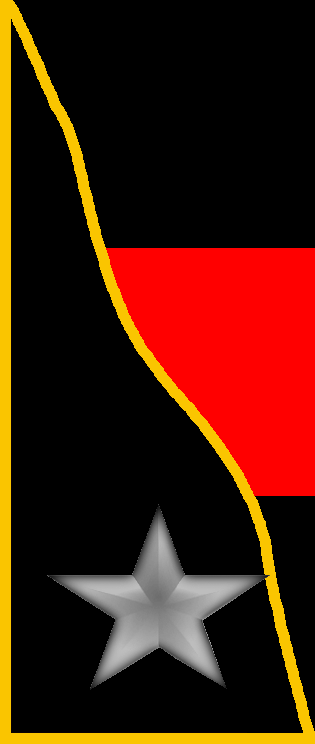
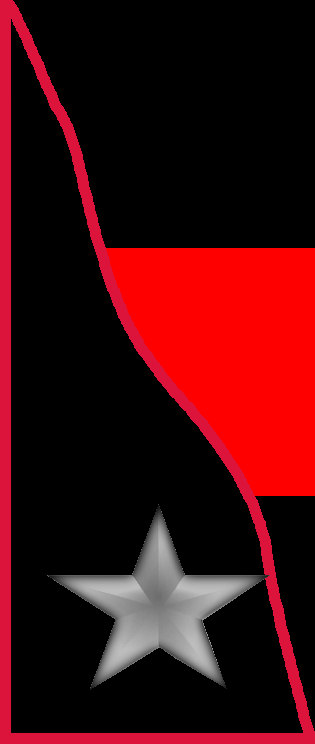
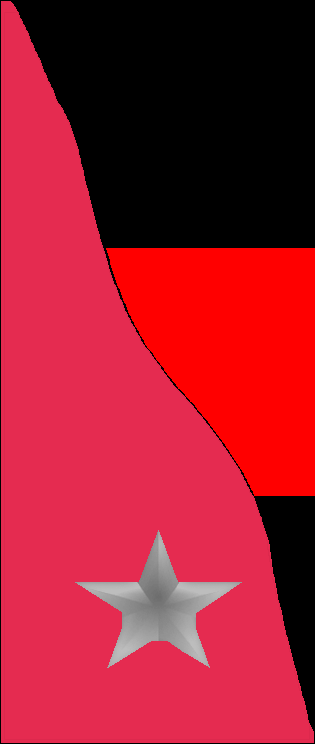
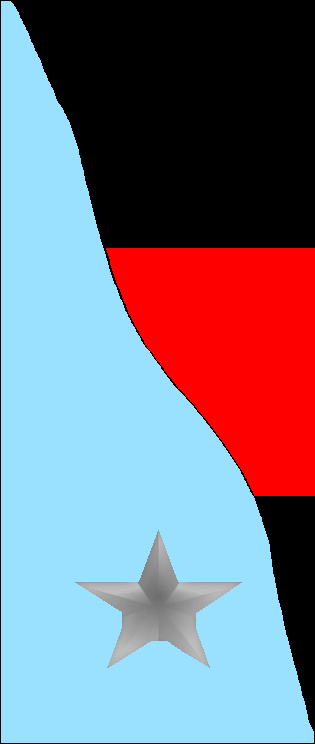
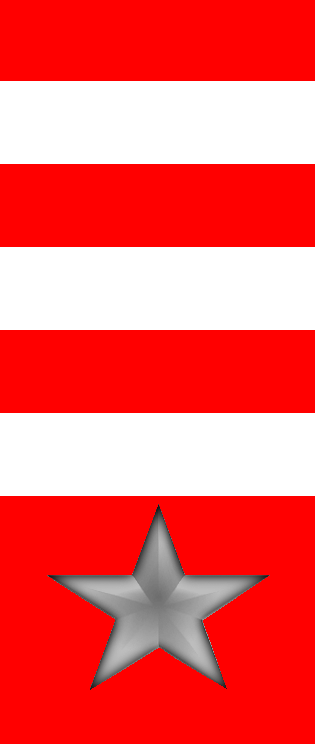
- Identification symbol: Murge Division gorget patches

The 154th Infantry Division "Murge" (Italian: 154ª Divisione di fanteria "Murge") was an infantry division of the Royal Italian Army during World War II. The Murge was formed on 1 December 1942 and named for the Murge plateau in Apulia. The Murge was classified as an occupation infantry division, which meant that the division's artillery regiment consisted of two artillery groups instead of the three artillery groups of line infantry divisions and that the divisional mortar battalion was replaced by a divisional machine gun battalion. The division was sent to Herzegovina as an occupation force, where it took part in anti-partisan operations. It took part in the Battle of the Sutjeska and then had to be withdrawn after suffering heavy losses. It was disbanded in September 1943, following the announcement of the Armistice of Cassibile.

== History ==
=== World War I ===
The division's lineage begins with the Brigade "Murge" raised on 26 February 1917 with the 259th and 260th infantry regiments. The brigade fought on the Italian front in World War I and together with its regiments was disbanded after the war in July 1919.

Between 1934 and 1939 23rd Infantry Division "Murge" was active in Bari, which on 24 May 1939 changed its name to 23rd Infantry Division "Ferrara".

=== World War II ===
The 154th Infantry Division Murge was activated in Saluzzo on 1 December 1941 and consisted of the 259th and 260th infantry regiments, and the 154th Artillery Regiment. As a division raised during the war the "Murge" did not have its own regimental depots and therefore its regiments were raised by the depots of the 36th Infantry Division "Forlì": the 259th Infantry Regiment "Murge" was raised in Alba on 1 September 1941 by the 43rd Infantry Regiment "Forlì" and the 260th Infantry Regiment "Murge" was raised in Saluzzo on 15 October 1941 by the 44th Infantry Regiment "Forlì", while the 154th Artillery Regiment "Murge" was raised by the 27th Artillery Regiment "Cuneo" in Milan.

After the Axis' invasion of Yugoslavia in April 1941 the division was sent to Herzegovina, where it based its headquarter in Mostar and its units in Jablanica, Konjic, Gacko and Nevesinje. Already during its deployment from 15 April to 31 May the division was engaged by Yugoslav partisans, a struggle that continued unabated for all the division's stay in Herzegovina. In February 1943 during the Battle of the Neretva the partisans' 2nd Proletarian Assault Brigade and 5th Proletarian Assault Brigade overran the Murge's positions in Prozor, Jablanica and Gornja Drežnica, annihilating most of the 259th Infantry Regiment and the I Battalion of the 260th Infantry Regiment. The losses were filled by the transfer of men and equipment from the 311th Infantry Regiment "Casale" of the 56th Infantry Division "Casale", which had joined the Murge in the summer of 1942.

In March 1943 the division was transferred to Lika in Croatia, where combat with partisan formations was intense and fierce. In May 1943 the division was moved to Dubrovnik and Trebinje, where it participated in the Battle of Sutjeska. In late August 1943 the division was ordered to return to Italy. On 8 September 1943 when the Armistice of Cassibile was announced the division was located between Senj and Bakar. The division moved to Rijeka, where it was disbanded on 14 September by invading German forces.

== Organization ==
154th Infantry Division "Murge" organization

- 154th Infantry Division "Murge"
  - Headquarters
    - Command Company
    - 118th Carabinieri Section
    - 119th Carabinieri Section
    - 154th Field Post Office
    - 154th Infantry Division Command Transport Squad
  - 259th Infantry Regiment "Murge"
    - Command Company
    - 3 × Fusilier battalions
    - Cannons Company (47/32 mod. 35 anti-tank guns)
    - Mortar Company (81mm Mod. 35 mortars)
  - 260th Infantry Regiment "Murge"
    - Command Company
    - 3 × Fusilier battalions
    - Cannons Company (47/32 mod. 35 anti-tank guns)
    - Mortar Company (81mm Mod. 35 mortars)
  - 311th Infantry Regiment "Casale" (transferred from the 56th Infantry Division "Casale" in summer 1942)
    - Command Company
    - 3 × Fusilier battalions (2 × battalions transferred to the depleted 259th Infantry Regiment "Murge" in March 1943, replaced by the dismounted cavalry squadron groups: XXIX "Genova Cavalleria" and XXXI "Lancieri di Aosta")
    - Anti-tank Company (47/32 mod. 35 anti-tank guns)
    - Mortar Company (81mm Mod. 35 mortars)
  - 154th Artillery Regiment "Murge"
    - Command Unit
    - I Group (100/22 mod. 14/19 howitzers)
    - II Group (75/27 mod. 06 field guns)
    - 1 × Anti-aircraft battery (20/65 Mod. 35 anti-aircraft guns)
    - Ammunition and Supply Unit
  - CLIV Machine Gun Battalion
  - CLIV Mixed Engineer Battalion
    - 154th Engineer Company
    - 254th Telegraph and Radio Operators Company
  - 154th Anti-tank Company (47/32 mod. 35 anti-tank guns; transferred to the 3rd Infantry Division "Ravenna" for the deployment in the Soviet Union)
  - 154th Medical Section
    - 2 × Field hospitals
    - 1 × Surgical unit
  - 154th Supply Section
  - 1119th Transport Section

Attached to the division in 1943:

- XXIX CC.NN. Battalion
- LXVI Coastal Artillery Group (152/13 howitzers)

== Commanding officers ==
The division's commanding officers were:

- Generale di Brigata Paride Negri (1 December 1941 - 28 February 1943)
- Generale di Divisione Bartolomeo Pedrotti (1 March 1943 - 30 April 1943)
- Generale di Divisione Eduardo Quarra Sito (1 May 1943 - 14 September 1943)

== CROWCASS ==
The names of twelve men attached to the division can be found in the Central Registry of War Criminals and Security Suspects (CROWCASS) set up by the Anglo-American Supreme Headquarters Allied Expeditionary Force in 1945. The names can be found at: Central Registry of War Criminals and Security Suspects from the Kingdom of Italy.

== Popular culture ==
Alistair MacLean's novel Partisans, set in the Balkan Theater of World War II, mentions the Murge as being a major force in the Axis offensives against the Yugoslav Partisans. The book begins during the preparation for Case White and ends with the protagonists having accomplished a significant espionage mission that would ensure the mauling of the Murge at the hands of the Yugoslav Resistance.
