= 101st Motorized Division "Trieste" =

Motorized Division of the Royal Italian Army

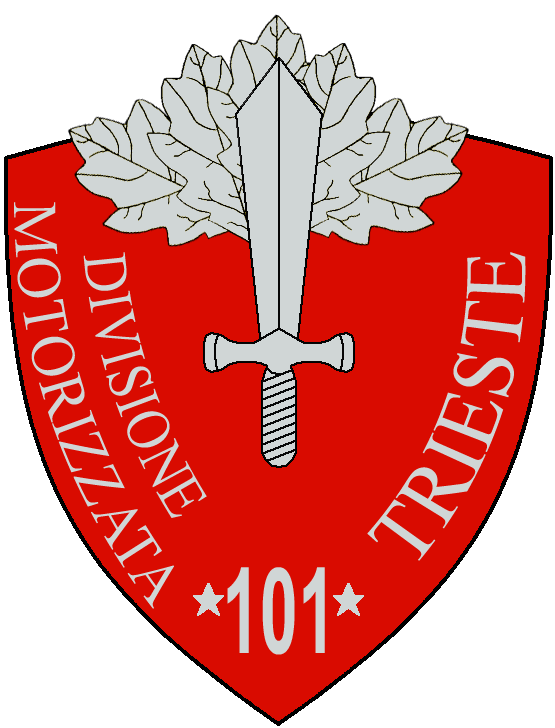
- 101st Motorized Division "Trieste" insignia
- Active: 1939–1943
- Country: Kingdom of Italy
- Branch: Royal Italian Army
- Type: Infantry
- Role: Motorized
- Size: Division
- Part of: XX Army Corps
- Garrison/HQ: Piacenza
- Engagements: World War II; Operation Crusader; Battle of Gazala; Battle of Bir Hakeim; First Battle of El Alamein; Battle of Alam el Halfa; Second Battle of El Alamein; Battle of the Mareth Line; Battle of Wadi Akarit

Insignia
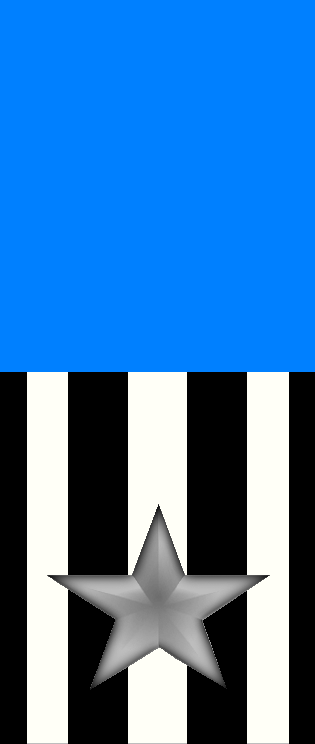
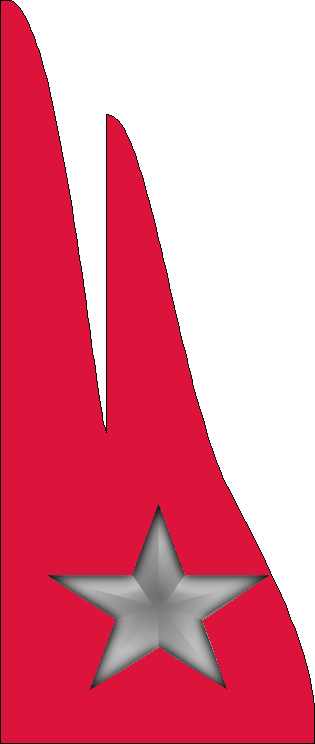
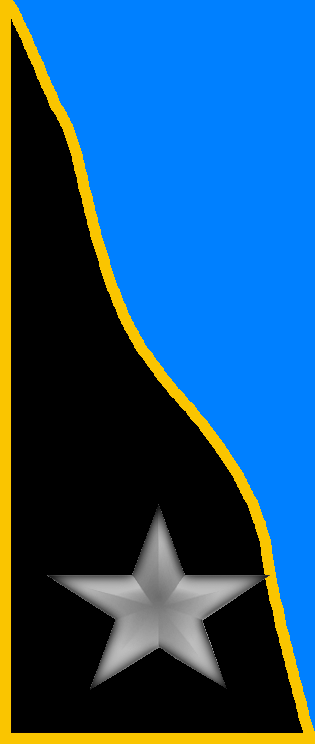
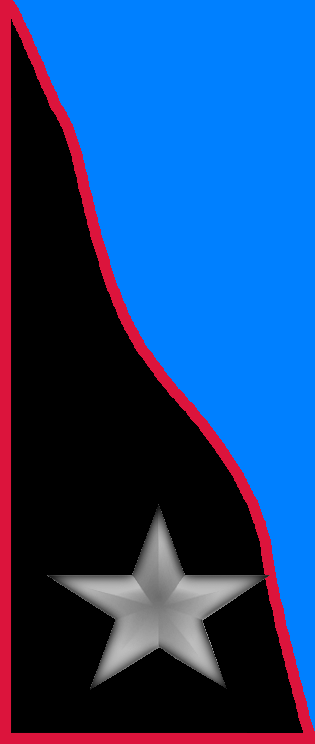
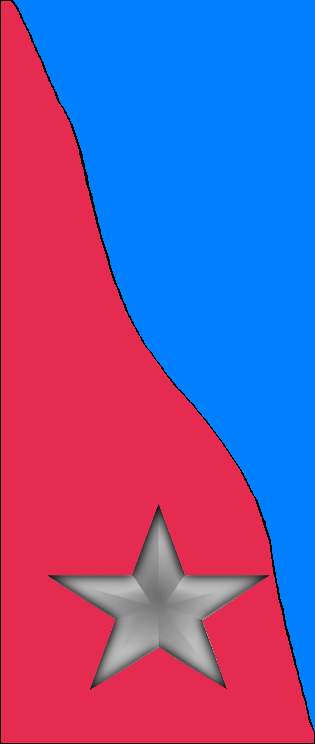
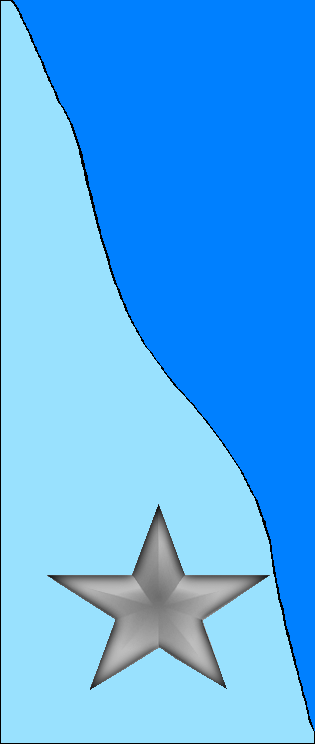
- Identification symbol: Trieste Division gorget patches

101st Motorized Division "Trieste" (Italian: 101ª Divisione motorizzata "Trieste") was a motorized infantry division of the Royal Italian Army during World War II. The Trieste was formed in 1939 and named for the city of Trieste. The division and its infantry and artillery regiments were based in Piacenza, while the 9th Bersaglieri Regiment was based until 1940 in Treviso and then moved to Cremona to be closer to the division. In September 1941 the Trieste was transferred to Libya for the Western Desert Campaign. The division was decimated in the Second Battle of El Alamein, but was rebuilt with the survivors of destroyed divisions. The Trieste then participated in the Tunisian Campaign until Axis forces in Tunisia surrendered to allied forces on 13 May 1943.

== History ==
The division's lineage begins with the Brigade "Valtellina" established in Turin on 1 August 1861 with the 65th and 66th infantry regiments.

=== World War I ===
The brigade fought on the Italian front in World War I. On 15 October 1926 the brigade assumed the name of VIII Infantry Brigade with the 61st Infantry Regiment "Sicilia", 62nd Infantry Regiment "Sicilia", and 65th Infantry Regiment "Valtellina". The brigade was the infantry component of the 8th Territorial Division of Piacenza, which also included the 21st Field Artillery Regiment. In 1934 the division changed its name to 8th Infantry Division "Po".

On 1 November 1936 the division ceded the 62nd Infantry Regiment to the Trento division. On 6 May 1937 the division received the 66th Infantry Regiment "Valtellina" from the 16th Infantry Division "Fossalta". On 15 May 1937 the division ceded the 61st Infantry Regiment to the Trento division. The division was then motorized and changed its name to 8th Motorized Division "Po". In 1938 the division received the 9th Bersaglieri Regiment. On 2 January 1939 the division changed its number to 101st and on 4 April the division received the name "Trieste". On the same date the 65th and 66th infantry regiments, and the 21st artillery regiment changed their names to "Trieste".

=== World War II ===
==== Invasion of France ====
On 10 June 1940 Italy entered World War II and began to invade France. The Trieste and the 133rd Armored Division "Littorio" were sent to the Aosta Valley to exploit a planned breakthrough at the Little St Bernard Pass, which was to be achieved by the 1st Alpine Division "Taurinense" on the left flank and the 2nd Alpine Division "Tridentina" on the right flank, with the Trieste taking the pass itself. After the initial attacks had failed a tank battalion from the Littorio's 33rd Tank Infantry Regiment was sent forward on 24 June 1940, but the Italian tankettes became bogged down in the rugged and snowy terrain. French anti-tank gunners then destroyed a number of Italian tankettes and the battalion withdrew. The same day the Franco-Italian Armistice came into effect and the war ended.

==== Greco-Italian War ====
In November 1940 the bulk of the division moved to Salerno in Campania, while the division's command and artillery regiment were sent to Albania to shore up the crumbling Italian forces during the Greco-Italian War. The division's command formed the Special Alpine Division with a mix of reinforcements from Italy, while the artillery groups reinforced other artillery regiments. On 28 March 1941 the division's units returned to Italy.

==== Western Desert Campaign ====
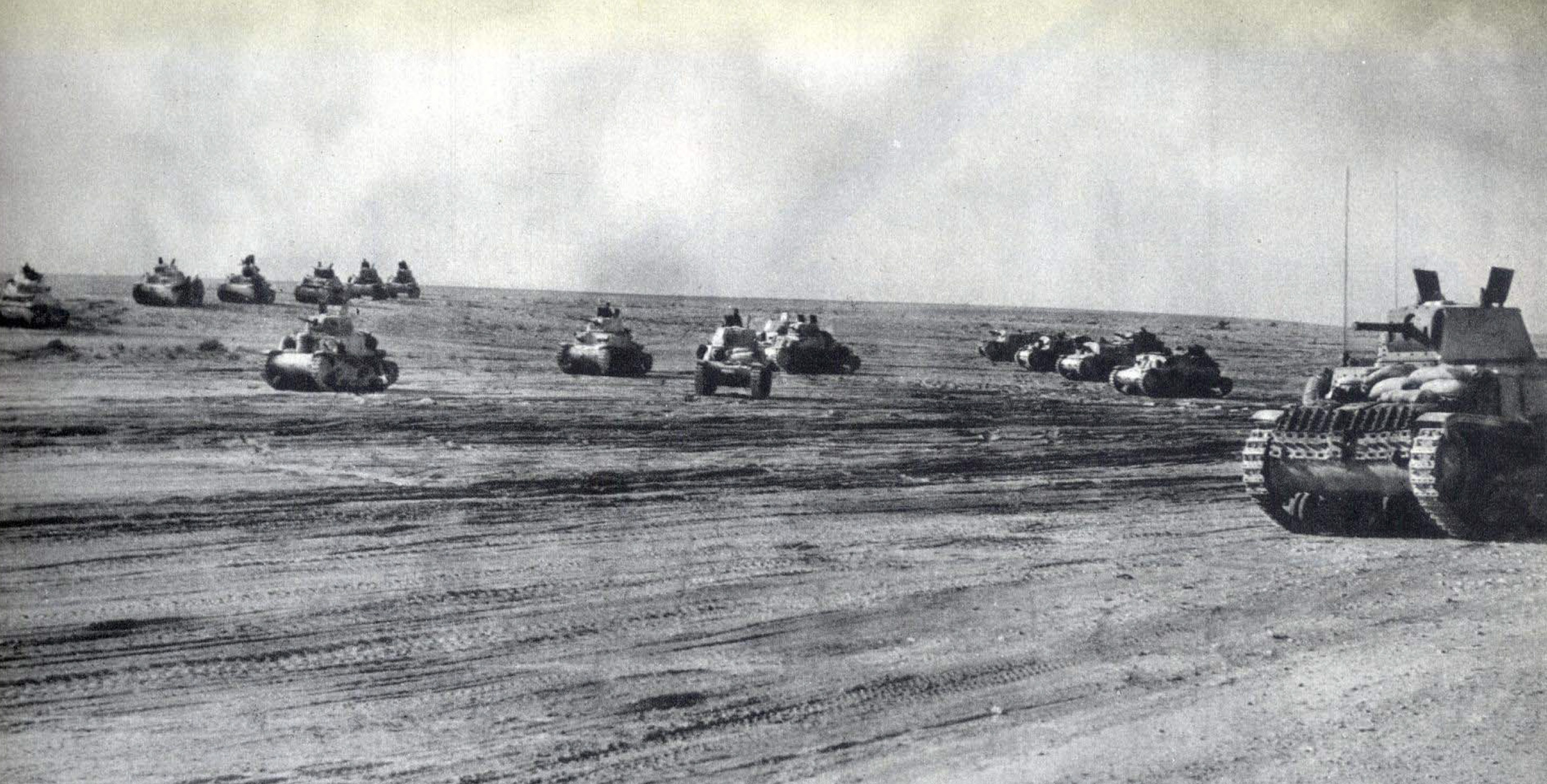
Royal Italian Army tanks during the Western Desert campaign

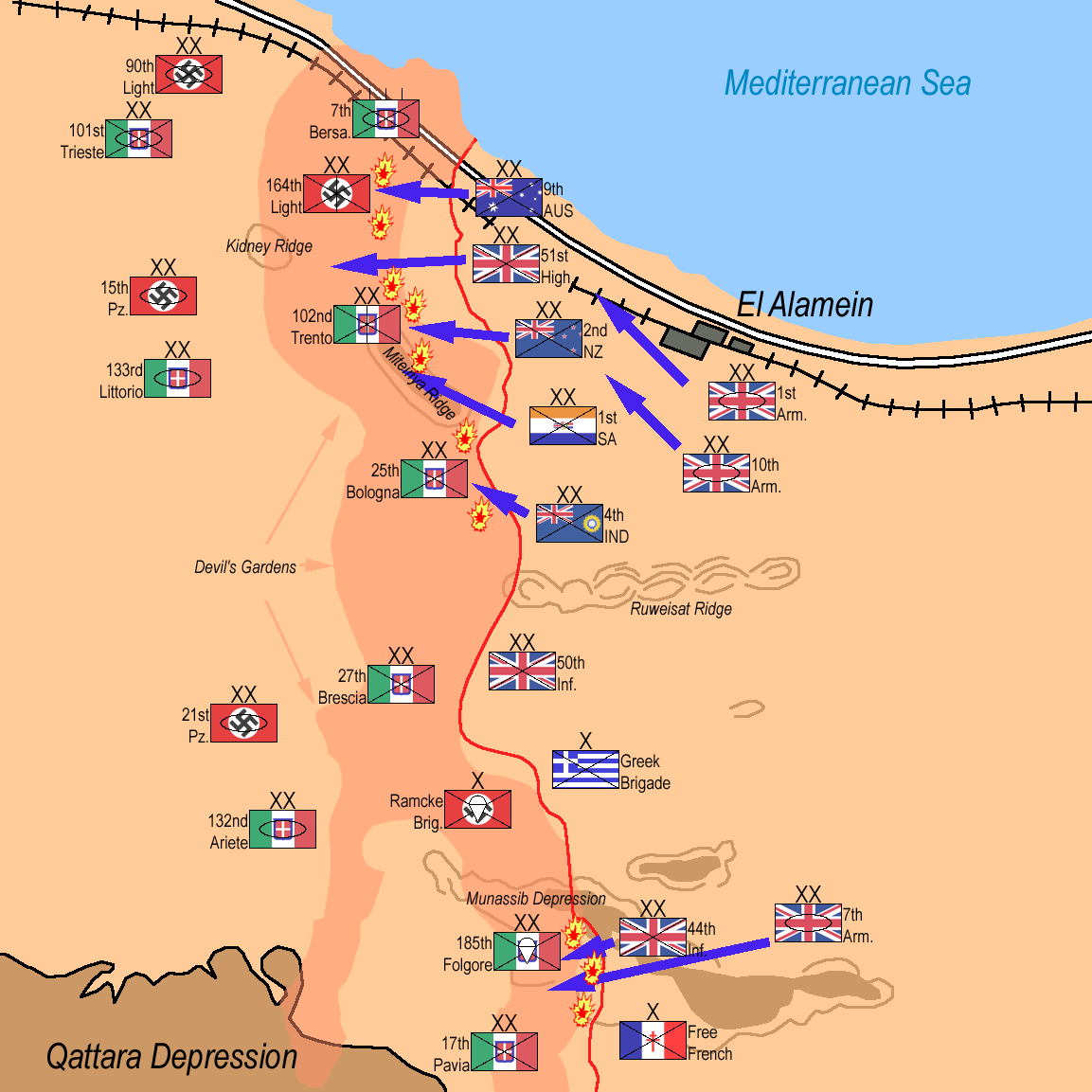
Second Battle of El Alamein: Trieste starting position on 23 October

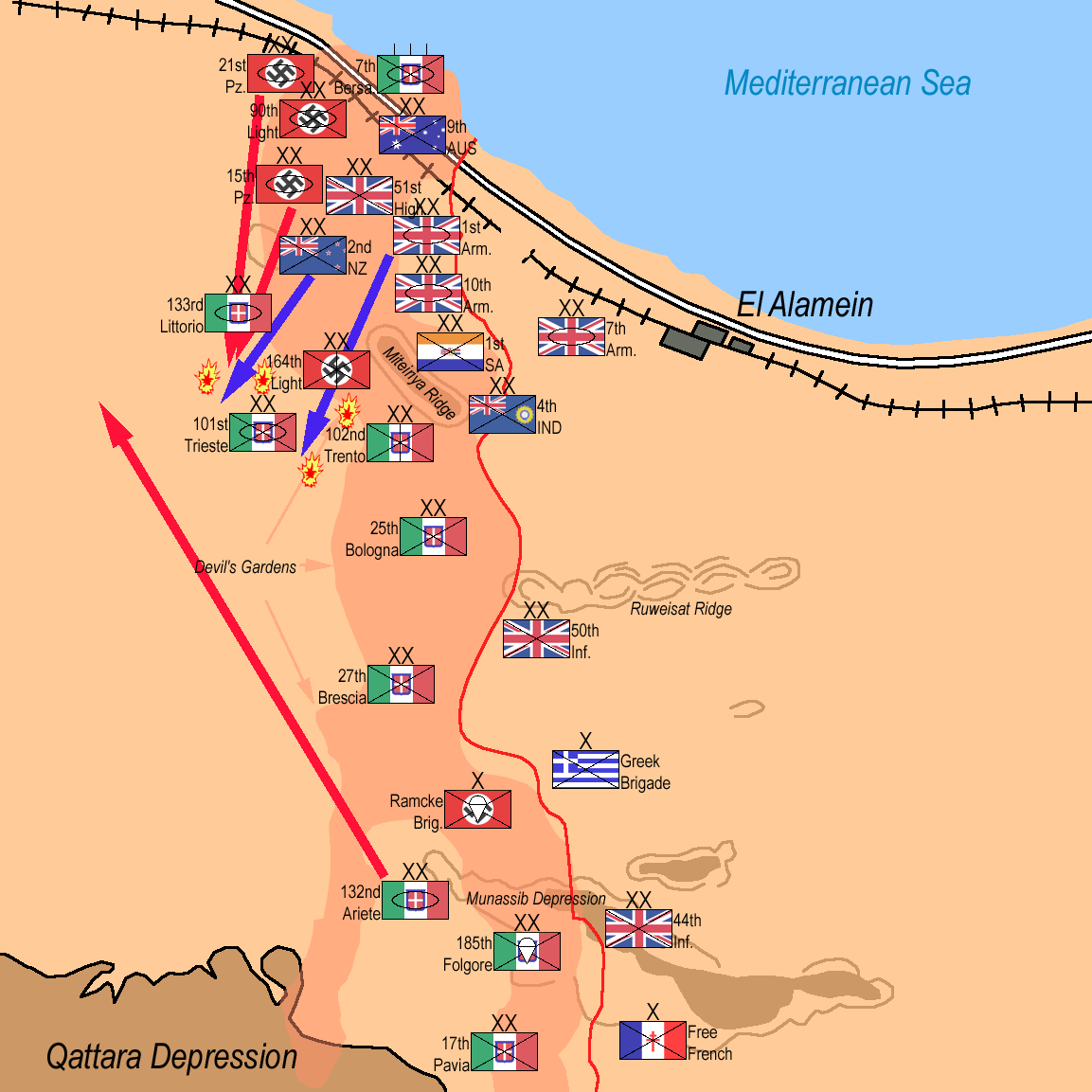
Second Battle of El Alamein: Trieste at 10pm on 2 November almost surrounded

In September 1941 the division disembarked in Libya for the Western Desert Campaign. The Trieste was immediately employed in the Siege of Tobruk covering the besieging forces right flank. The division then moved to Bir Hakeim to block British attacks from the southeastern desert.

On 18 November 1941 the British Eighth Army launched Operation Crusader to relieve the siege of Tobruk. By 23 November the Trieste, together with the 55th Infantry Division "Savona", and 132nd Armored Division "Ariete" had knocked out about 200 British tanks, and a similar number of vehicles were disabled or destroyed. On 24 November, General Erwin Rommel ordered the Afrika Korps and Ariete to push east to relieve the Siege of Bardia and the frontier garrisons. The same day Trieste was sent further South to cover the right flank of Rommel's advance. On 6 December the Axis forces received the order to retreat westwards and the Trieste formed the rearguard and fought delaying battles at Bir Bellafaa, Sidi Breghish, Alem Hamza, and Suluq.

After reorganizing at El Agheila the German-Italian Panzer Group Africa counterattacked on 21 January 1942 and drove British forces back to Ain el Gazala. On 26 May 1942 Axis force commenced the Battle of Gazala. The plan was for the German divisions to outflank the British defenders by marching through the desert to the South of Bir Hakeim, with the two divisions of the Italian XX Army Corps covering the Germans left flank: the Ariete would attack Bir Hakeim, and the Trieste would open a gap in the minefield north of the Bir Hakeim to create a supply route for the German divisions on their drive to the coast. On 29 May the Trieste had broken through British lines and reached Got el Ualeb, while to the division's South the Battle of Bir Hakeim unfolded. On 8-11 June the Trieste participated in the assault on Bir Hakeim, which the French defenders abandoned on 11 June. On 12 June the Trieste took part in the destruction of the British 2nd and 4th Armoured Brigades south of the Knightsbridge position. From 19 June the Trieste participated in the Axis offensive to capture Tobruk, which fell on 21 June. The Trieste then pursued the retreating British forces and clashed with rearguards at Sidi Omar, Mersa Matruh until reaching El Alamein in Egypt.

==== Battles of El Alamein ====
On 1 July 1942 the First Battle of El Alamein began and the Trieste put up a tenacious defence on Ruweisat Ridge on the night of 21-22 July. The division lost two regimental commanders before being partly overcome by British attacks, but the delay of the Allied advance allowed German armored forces to launch a devastating counterattack.

During the Battle of Alam el Halfa the Trieste was in the center of the Axis advance, but stiff British resistance forced General Erwin Rommel to abandon the battle and retreat to the Axis' starting positions. On 23 October 1942 the British commenced the Second Battle of El Alamein and the Trieste initially formed the reserve in the North of the Axis line. On 26 October the Trieste entered the front line. On 2 November British forces broke through the Trieste's line and a 4-5 km gap opened between the battalions of the 65th Infantry Regiment "Trieste". Most of the Trieste was annihilated over the course of the next two days. On 4 November the division's command and most of the 66th Infantry Regiment "Trieste" retreated to Fuka and thus escaped the destruction of Axis forces at El Alamein.

The remnants of the German-Italian Panzer Army retreated to El Agheila, where on 26 November 1942 the Trieste's two infantry regiments were reorganized and brought back up to combat strength by accumulating the survivors of other divisions.

- 65th Infantry Regiment "Trieste"
  - I Battalion "Trieste" (4× companies, survivors of the 65th Motorized Infantry Regiment "Trieste", 17th Infantry Division "Pavia", and 27th Infantry Division "Brescia")
  - II Battalion "Bologna" (5× companies, survivors of the 25th Infantry Division "Bologna")
  - III Battalion "Trento" (3× companies, survivors of the 102nd Motorized Division "Trento")
- 66th Infantry Regiment "Trieste"
  - I Battalion (2× companies, survivors of the 66th Motorized Infantry Regiment "Trieste")
  - II Battalion (2× companies, survivors of the 66th Motorized Infantry Regiment "Trieste")
  - III Battalion "Granatieri di Sardegna" (3× companies, survivors of the IV Anti-tank Battalion "Granatieri di Sardegna")

==== Tunisian Campaign ====
On 11-18 December 1942 the Trieste participated in the Battle of El Agheila, after which Axis forces resumed their retreat towards Tunisia where the Trieste participated in the Tunisian Campaign. In February 1943 the two fusilier battalions of the 66th Motorized Infantry Regiment "Trieste" merged and formed the I Battalion "Trieste", while the "Granatieri di Sardegna" battalion changed its number to II Battalion. The regiment then received the III Battalion "Folgore", which had been formed with the survivors of the 185th Infantry Division "Folgore". The division then fought in the Battle of Medenine, the Battle of the Mareth Line, and the Battle of Wadi Akarit, before retreating to the Enfidaville Line. There the division surrendered on 13 May 1943 to allied forces.

== Organization ==
=== 1940-41 ===
101st Motorized Division "Trieste" organization in 1940

101st Motorized Division "Trieste" organization 1941

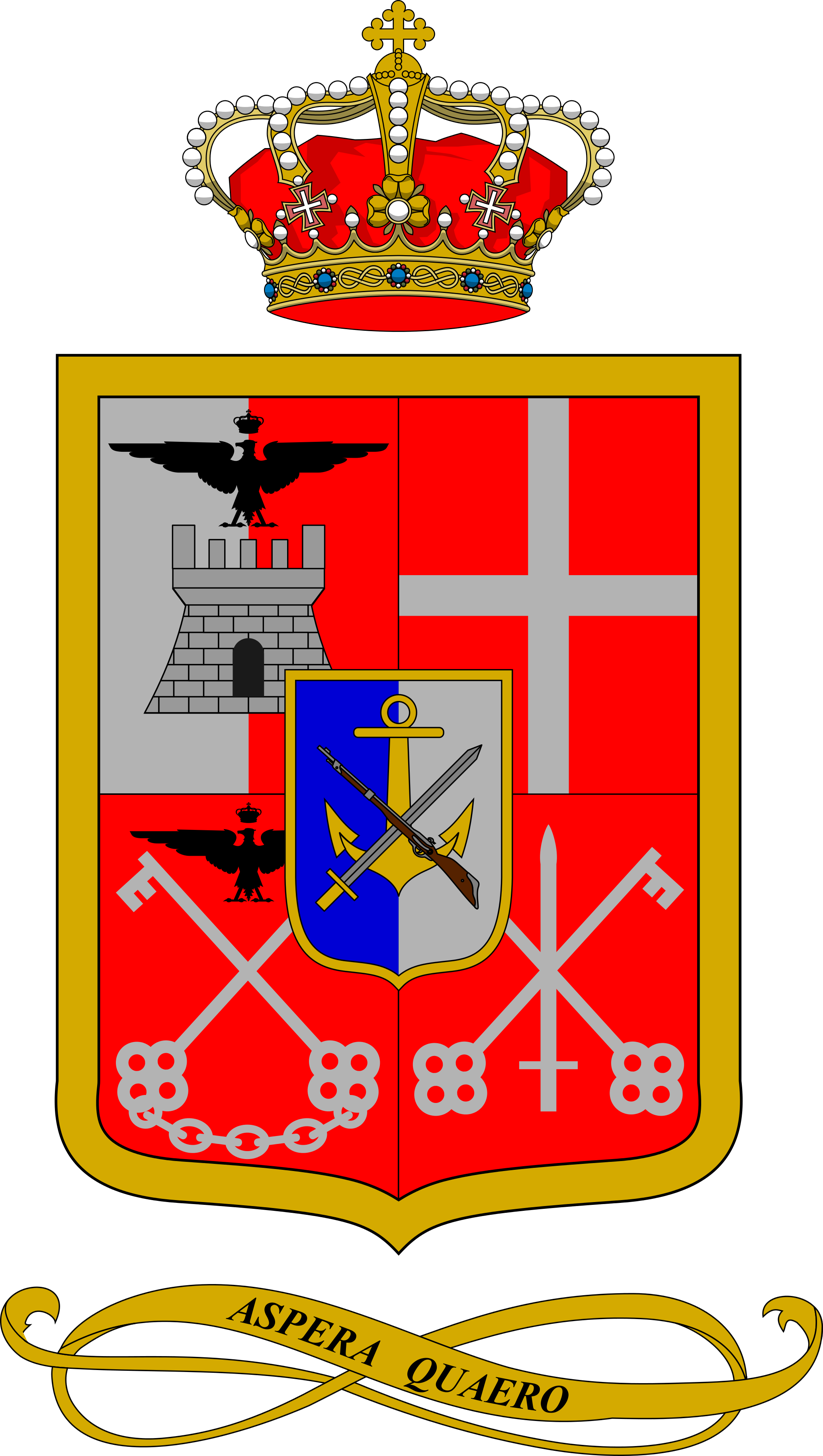
Coat of Arms of the 65th Infantry Regiment "Valtellina", 1939

- 101st Motorized Division "Trieste", in Piacenza
  - Headquarters
    - Command Company
    - 22nd Carabinieri Section
    - 23rd Carabinieri Section
    - 56th Field Post Office
    - 101st Motorized Division Command Transport Squad
  - 65th Motorized Infantry Regiment "Trieste" (Note: Named 65th Infantry Regiment "Valtellina" until 1939 when the army reorganized its divisions as binary divisions and divisional infantry regiments took the name of the division.), in Piacenza
    - Command Company
    - 3 × Fusilier battalions
      - Command Company, 3 × Fusilier companies, 1 × Weapons Company (Breda M37 heavy machine guns and 45mm mod. 35 mortars)
    - Support Weapons Battery (65/17 mod. 13 infantry support guns)
    - Mortar Company (81mm mod. 35 mortars)
  - 66th Motorized Infantry Regiment "Trieste" (Note: Named 66th Infantry Regiment "Valtellina" until 1939 when the army reorganized its divisions as binary divisions and divisional infantry regiments took the name of the division.), in Piacenza
    - Command Company
    - 3 × Fusilier battalions
      - Command Company, 3 × Fusilier companies, 1 × Weapons Company (Breda M37 heavy machine guns and 45mm mod. 35 mortars)
    - Support Weapons Battery (65/17 mod. 13 infantry support guns)
    - Mortar Company (81 mm mod. 35 mortars)
  - 9th Bersaglieri Regiment, in Cremona (joined the division on 1 April 1939, transferred to the X Army Corps on 29 March 1942)
    - Command Company
    - XXVIII Cyclists Battalion (disbanded on 11 July 1939)
    - XXX Auto-transported Battalion
      - Command Company, 2 × Bersaglieri companies, 1 × Anti-tank Company (47/32 mod. 35 anti-tank guns; formed in North Africa)
    - XXXII Motorcyclists Battalion (reorganized as XXXII Support Weapons Battalion in September 1941)
      - Command Company, 3 × Motorcyclists companies
    - XXXII Support Weapons Battalion (formed in September 1941)
      - Command Platoon, 1 × Machine Gun Company (Breda M37 heavy machine guns), 1 × Mortar Company (81mm mod. 35 mortars), 1 × Anti-aircraft Company (20/65 mod. 35 anti-aircraft guns)
    - XL Auto-transported Battalion (formed in April 1940; renamed XXVIII Auto-transported Battalion on 3 November 1940)
      - Command Company, 2 × Bersaglieri companies, 1 × Anti-tank Company (47/32 mod. 35 anti-tank guns; formed in North Africa)
    - 105th Cannons Company (47/32 mod. 35 anti-tank guns; disbanded in September 1941)
    - Transport Unit
  - 21st Artillery Regiment "Trieste", in Piacenza
    - Command Unit
    - I Group (100/17 mod. 16 howitzers)
    - II Group (75/27 mod. 06 field guns)
    - III Group (75/27 mod. 06 field guns)
    - IX Group (105/28 cannons; joined the regiment in June 1941)
    - XXI Mixed Anti-aircraft Group (joined the regiment in June 1941)
      - 2 × Anti-aircraft batteries (75/27 C.K. anti-aircraft guns on Lancia 1Z trucks)
      - 1 × Anti-aircraft battery (20/65 mod. 35 anti-aircraft guns)
    - 3 × Anti-aircraft batteries (20/65 mod. 35 anti-aircraft guns)
    - 301st Anti-tank Battery (47/32 mod. 35 anti-tank guns; joined the regiment in June 1941)
    - Ammunition and Supply Unit
  - DVIII Machine Gun Battalion (reorganized as a DVIII Anti-tank Battalion in September 1941; left the division in December 1941)
  - LII Mixed Engineer Battalion
  - 80th Transport Section
  - 90th Medical Section
    - 16th Field Hospital
    - 65th Field Hospital
    - 214th Field Hospital
    - 242nd Field Hospital
    - 1 × Surgical unit
  - 176th Supply Section

=== 1942 ===
On 2 January 1942, after the Italian divisions had suffered heavy losses of personnel and equipment during the British Operation Crusader, General Ettore Bastico, the commander of Axis forces in North Africa, ordered that frontline infantry divisions in North Africa, with the exception of the 101st Motorized Division "Trieste", should be reorganized according to the new Auto-transportable North-African-type 42 table of organization and equipment. With the same order Bastico decreed that the Trieste division should consists of a command, an armored car battalion, a tank battalion, two motorized infantry regiments, an artillery regiment, a mixed engineer battalion, a medical section, a supply section, and a divisional transport group. Furthermore Bastico ordered that the division's 9th Bersaglieri Regiment would be transferred to the X Army Corps. Per Bastico's order the Trieste's two infantry regiments were cut down to two battalions of four fusilier companies each and the regiment's heavy weapons were distributed equally among the companies. Each fusilier company then consisted of a command, a fusilier platoon, a machine gun platoon with three Breda M37 heavy machine guns, an anti-tank platoon with three S-18/1000 anti-tank rifles, and an anti-tank platoon with three 47/32 mod. 35 anti-tank guns. Bastico also ordered that, if men and materiel should become available, each regiment was to form a third battalion. Additionally it was planned to strengthen the division's artillery regiments by adding a fourth artillery group equipped with 100/17 mod. 16 howitzers and an anti-aircraft/anti-tank group with either German 8.8 cm Flak cannons or Italian 90/53 cannons. On 1 April 1942, the Trieste division's 21st Artillery Regiment "Trieste" was reorganized and afterwards the division consisted of the following units:

101st Motorized Division "Trieste" organization in 1942

- 101st Motorized Division "Trieste"
  - Headquarters
    - Command Company
    - 22nd Carabinieri Section
    - 56th Field Post Office
    - 101st Motorized Division Command Transport Squad
  - 65th Motorized Infantry Regiment "Trieste"
    - Command Company
    - 2 × Fusilier battalions
      - Command Company, 4 × Fusilier companies, each consisting of a command, and 1 × Fusilier Platoon, 1 × Machine Gun Platoon (Breda M37 heavy machine guns), 1 × Anti-tank Platoon (S-18/1000 anti-tank rifles), 1 × Anti-tank Platoon (47/32 mod. 35 anti-tank guns)
    - Mortar Company (81mm mod. 35 mortars)
  - 66th Motorized Infantry Regiment "Trieste"
    - Command Company
    - 2 × Fusilier battalions
      - Command Company, 4 × Fusilier companies, each consisting of a command, and 1 × Fusilier Platoon, 1 × Machine Gun Platoon (Breda M37 heavy machine guns), 1 × Anti-tank Platoon (S-18/1000 anti-tank rifles), 1 × Anti-tank Platoon (47/32 mod. 35 anti-tank guns)
    - Mortar Company (81mm mod. 35 mortars)
  - 21st Artillery Regiment "Trieste"
    - Command Unit
    - I Group (100/17 mod. 16 howitzers)
    - II Group (100/17 mod. 16 howitzers)
    - III Group (75/27 mod. 06 field guns)
    - IV Group (75/27 mod. 06 field guns)
    - V Group (7.5cm PL vz.37 anti-aircraft guns; former LXII Anti-aircraft Group)
    - 411th Anti-aircraft Battery (20/65 mod. 35 anti-aircraft guns)
    - 446th Anti-aircraft Battery (20/65 mod. 35 anti-aircraft guns)
    - Ammunition and Supply Unit
  - VIII Armored Bersaglieri Battalion (AB 41 armored cars; formed by the depot of the 12th Bersaglieri Regiment as CXXXIII Armored Battalion, attached to the division from 11 May 1942)
  - XI Tank Battalion M (M13/40 tanks; transferred from the 133rd Armored Division "Littorio" on 2 April 1942)
  - LII Mixed Engineer Battalion
  - 80th Transport Unit
  - 90th Medical Section
    - 16th Field Hospital
    - 65th Field Hospital
    - 214th Field Hospital
    - 242nd Field Hospital
    - 1 × Surgical unit
  - 176th Supply Section

Attached to the division during the Tunisian Campaign:

- X CC.NN. Battalion
- LXXXII Replacements Battalion
- CII Guardia alla Frontiera Artillery Group

== Military honors ==
For its conduct during the Western Desert campaign the President of Italy awarded on 7 December 1951 to the 66th Infantry Regiment "Trieste" Italy's highest military honor, the Gold Medal of Military Valor. The division's artillery regiment, the 21st Artillery Regiment "Trieste" was awarded the same award on 18 April 1992.

- 66th Infantry Regiment "Trieste" on 7 December 1951
- 21st Artillery Regiment "Trieste" on 18 April 1992

== Commanding officers ==
The division's commanding officers were:

- Generale di Divisione Emilio Garavelli (25 November 1938 – 9 August 1939)
- Generale di Divisione Vito Ferroni (10 August 1939 – 10 September 1940)
- Generale di Divisione Alessandro Piazzoni (11 September 1940 – 10 December 1941)
- Generale di Brigata Arnaldo Azzi (11 December 1941 – 30 July 1942)
- Generale di Brigata Francesco La Ferla (31 July 1942 – 13 May 1943, POW)

== See also ==
- Mechanized Brigade "Trieste"

== Bibliography ==
- Paoletti, Ciro (2008). A Military History of Italy. Greenwood Publishing Group. ISBN 978-0-275-98505-9.
- Mitcham, Samuel W. (2008). The Rise of the Wehrmacht: The German Armed Forces and World War II, 1941–43. Vol. I. Praeger. ISBN 978-0-275-99659-8.
- Toppe, Generalmajor Alfred (1990) [~1947]. German Experiences in Desert Warfare During World War II (PDF). Vol. II (The Black Vault ed.). Washington: Historical Division, European Command: US Marine Corps. FMFRP 12-96-II.
- Loi, Salvatore Aggredisci e Vincerai – Storia della Divisione Motorizzata "Trieste", Mursia, Milano
