= Flechas Division =

Flechas Division (Flechas = Arrows, in Spanish) was created from the Flechas Negras Brigade expanded into a Division sized unit. It served in the Aragon Offensive and the March to the Sea, in 1938, during the Spanish Civil War. Italians from the Corpo Truppe Volontarie served in these mixed Italo-Spanish Flechas (Arrows) units where the Italians provided the officers and technical personnel, while the Spanish served in the rank-and-file. For its final campaign it was further strengthened and renamed Flechas Negras Division.

== Order of battle ==
Division "Flechas" - Mario Roatta

- Brigada Flechas Negras - Col. Sandro Piazzoni
  - 1st Regiment
    - 1st Battalion "Monte Jata"
    - 2nd Battalion "Bermeo"
    - 3rd Battalion "Munguia"
    - Battery of 65/17
  - 2nd Regiment
    - 1st Battalion "Peña Amarilla"
    - 2nd Battalion "Santoña"
    - 3rd Battalion "Algorta"
    - Battery of 65/17
- Assault Battalion "Laredo"
- Artillery Group
  - Group of 75/27 "Vizcaya"
  - Group of 75/27
  - Battery of 20mm "Vizcaya"
  - Battery of 37mm "Somorrostro"
- Engineer Company
- Logistics Section
- Sanitation Section
- Military Police Section
- Division transport
- Arditi Platoon

== See also ==
- Flechas Negras Division

== Sources ==
- de Mesa, José Luis, El regreso de las legiones: (la ayuda militar italiana a la España nacional, 1936-1939), García Hispán, Granada:España, 1994 ISBN 84-87690-33-5
