= Paride Negri =

Italian General (1883-1954)

- Born: 2 September 1883; Perugia, Kingdom of Italy
- Died: 8 April 1954 (aged 70); Rome, Italy
- Military career
- Allegiance: Kingdom of Italy
- Branch: Royal Italian Army
- Rank: Lieutenant General
- Commands: Reserve Officer School; 27th Artillery Regiment; 41st Infantry Division "Firenze"; 154th Infantry Division "Murge"; VI Army Corps
- Conflicts: World War I; Battles of the Isonzo; World War II; Greco-Italian War; Yugoslav Front
- Awards: Bronze Medal of Military Valor (twice); War Cross for Military Valor; War Merit Cross (twice); Order of the Crown of Italy; Order of Saints Maurice and Lazarus

Paride Negri (2 September 1883 – 8 April 1954) was an Italian general during World War II.

== Biography ==
He was born in Perugia on 2 September 1883, the son of Pietro Negri. In 1900, he entered the Royal Academy of Artillery and Engineers in Turin, from which he graduated on 7 September 1903 with the rank of artillery second lieutenant. He participated in the Italo-Turkish War with the rank of captain, and later in the First World War, serving at the observation points operating on aerostatic balloons for the direction of artillery fire on the Isonzo Front; by the end of the war he reached the rank of major, being awarded a Bronze Medal and a War Cross for Military Valor.

After serving as a staff officer, he was promoted to colonel on 28 November 1929, first taking command of the Reserve Officer School of Lucca and then of the 27th Artillery Regiment between 1935 and 1936. On 1 June 1936, he was promoted to the rank of brigadier general. In 1937 he became commander of the artillery of the Army Corps of Udine, then he returned to Rome, where he was promoted to Head of Office of the Command of the Staff Officer Corps, later becoming Chief of Staff of the Army Command of Naples between 1938 and 1939.

From 15 September 1939 to 8 June 1941, after promotion to major general on 17 August 1939, he was commander of the 41st Infantry Division "Firenze", which he commanded during the campaign against Greece in March–April 1941, after which it was stationed in Montenegro as an occupation unit. After a period at the VII Army Corps for special duties from June to December 1941, on 1 December he was appointed commander of the 154th Infantry Division "Murge", stationed in Herzegovina for occupation duties, with garrisons in Mostar and other towns. The Division was engaged in operations against the Yugoslav partisans. In Mostar Negri declared to the German command that the Royal Italian Army would not take action against the Jews, and to a German officer who demanded that he hand over the Jews living in the area under his control he replied harshly: "The deportation of the Jews is contrary to the honor of Italian army".

On 13 May 1942, while crossing the woods of Bisina, six kilometers north of Nevesinje, with a large column of his division, he was ambushed by the partisans, who blocked the road with fallen trees, rocks and telegraph poles and opened fire on the head of the column, killing the commanding officer of the 154th Artillery Regiment and another four officers as well as the two drivers. Under heavy enemy fire, Negri managed to organise an improvised defence that allowed the column to retreat from the ambush site, and after the arrival of a reinforcing blackshirt unit he led the counterattack, in which he was slightly wounded. For this, he was awarded another Bronze Medal of Military Valor. From January to March 1943 he was acting commander of the VI Army Corps (having been promoted to lieutenant general), while also retaining command of the "Murge" Division until 1 March, and later he was placed at the disposal of the High Command of Slovenia and Dalmatia (SUPERSLODA). From March to early September 1943, he was attached to the Armed Forces High Command of Albania for special duties.

On 2 September 1943, he was assigned to the Ministry of War in Rome for special assignments, due to having reached the age limit. He died in Rome in 1954.
