= Flechas Verdes Division =

The Flechas Verdes Division was a division of the Nationalist forces during the Spanish Civil War. The name means "Green Arrows" in Spanish.

It was created when the Flechas Azules Mixed Brigade was expanded into two division-sized units: the Flechas Verdes and Flechas Azules Divisions. The Flechas Verdes Division served in the Catalonia Offensive, the final offensive of the Spanish Civil War. Italians from the Corpo Truppe Volontarie served in these mixed Italo-Spanish Flechas (Arrows) units where the Italians provided the officers and technical personnel, while the Spanish served in the rank-and-file.

== Order of battle ==
Division Flechas Verdes - Col. Emilio Battisti

- 1st Regimiento
  - 1st Battalion "Caceres"
  - 2nd Battalion "Bailen"
  - 3rd Battalion "Balaguer"
  - 4th Battalion "Gerona"
  - Battery of 65/17
- 2nd Regiment
  - 1st Battalion "Vitoria"
  - 2nd Battalion "Medina"
  - 3rd Battalion "Canarias"
  - 4th Battalion "Las Navas"
  - Battery of 65/17
- Battalion de maquinas
  - 1st Machinegun Company
  - 2nd Machinegun Company
  - 3rd Machinegun Company
  - 4th Mortar Company
- Anti Tank Company 47/35
- Artillery Regiment
  - Group of 65/17
  - Group of 75/27
  - Group of 100/17
  - 20mm AA Battery
- Engineer Company
- Radio Company
- Services Unit

== See also ==
- Flechas Azules Division
- Flechas Negras Division

== Sources ==
- de Mesa, José Luis, El regreso de las legiones: (la ayuda militar italiana a la España nacional, 1936–1939), García Hispán, Granada:España, 1994 ISBN 84-87690-33-5
