= Flechas Azules Division =

Flechas Azules Division was a division of the Nationalist forces during the Spanish Civil War. The name means "Blue Arrows" in Spanish.

It was created when the Flechas Azules Mixed Brigade was expanded into two division-sized units; the Flechas Azules and Flechas Verdes Divisions. The Flechas Azules Division served in the Catalonia Offensive, the final offensive of the Spanish Civil War. Italians from the Corpo Truppe Volontarie served in these mixed Italo-Spanish Flechas (Arrows) units where the Italians provided the officers and technical personnel, while the Spanish served in the rank-and-file.

== Order of battle ==
Division Flechas Azules - Col. Francesco La Ferla

- 1st Regiment
  - 1st Battalion "Cerro Toro"
  - 2nd Battalion "Sierra Lazaro"
  - 3rd Battalion "Sierra Alteruela"
  - Battery of 65/17
- 2nd Regiment
  - 1st Battalion "Sierra Avila"
  - 2nd Battalion "Sierra Argallen"
  - 3rd Battalion "Maggiore Roccio"
- Rifle Battalion
- Battalion de maquinas
  - 1st Machinegun Company
  - 2nd Machinegun Company
  - 3rd Machinegun Company
  - 4th Mortar Company
  - Anti Tank Company 47/35
- Artillery Regiment
  - Group of 65/17
  - Group of 75/27
  - Group of 100/17
  - 20mm AA Battery
  - Machinegun Company
- Engineer Company
- Radio Company
- Services Unit

== See also ==
- Flechas Negras Division

== Sources ==
- de Mesa, José Luis, El regreso de las legiones: (la ayuda militar italiana a la España nacional, 1936–1939), García Hispán, Granada:España, 1994 ISBN 84-87690-33-5
