= Alessandro Piazzoni =

Italian general

- Born: 2 May 1885; Rome, Kingdom of Italy
- Died: 14 May 1971 (aged 86); Brescia, Italy
- Military career
- Allegiance: Kingdom of Italy
- Branch: Royal Italian Army
- Rank: Lieutenant General
- Commands: 53rd Infantry Regiment "Umbria"; Flechas Negras Mixed Brigade; 50th Infantry Division "Regina"; 101st Motorized Division "Trieste"; Special Alpine Division; Corpo D'Armata di Manovra; 15th Infantry Division "Bergamo"; VI Army Corps
- Conflicts: Italo-Turkish War; World War I; Battle of Caporetto; Spanish Civil War; Battle of Santander; Battle of Bilbao; Aragon Offensive; World War II; Greco-Italian War; North African campaign; Siege of Tobruk; Operation Crusader; Yugoslav Front
- Awards: Silver Medal of Military Valor (twice); War Merit Cross (twice); Military Order of Savoy; Order of the Crown of Italy; Order of Saints Maurice and Lazarus

Alessandro Piazzoni, also known as Sandro Piazzoni (2 May 1885 – 14 May 1971) was an Italian general during World War II.

== Biography ==
Born into a noble Roman family, the son of Ernesto Piazzoni, he enlisted in the Royal Italian Army and entered the Royal Academy of Infantry and Cavalry in Modena on 14 September 1906, graduating with the rank of infantry second lieutenant. He participated in the Italo-Turkish War with the rank of captain, being decorated for military valor, and then in the First World War, by the end of which he had reached the rank of lieutenant colonel (in command of the 1st Battalion, 88th Infantry Regiment) and had been decorated with a Silver Medal of Military Valor (for his conduct during the withdrawal after the battle of Caporetto).

After attending the Army School of War and serving as a staff officer, he was promoted to colonel on 15 August 1932, first taking up the infantry inspectorate in Rome and then the command of the 53rd Infantry Regiment "Umbria" in 1935. He then participated in the Spanish Civil War in command of the Flechas Negras Mixed Brigade, participating in the battle of Santander, in the battle of Bilbao and in the Aragon Offensive and receiving another Silver Medal and the Knight's Cross of the Military Order of Savoy as well as promotion to brigadier general for war merit on 27 December 1937. After returning to Italy, he was attached to the Ministry of War in Rome in 1938-1939, after which he was given command of the 50th Infantry Division "Regina", stationed in the Dodecanese, with headquarters in Rome.

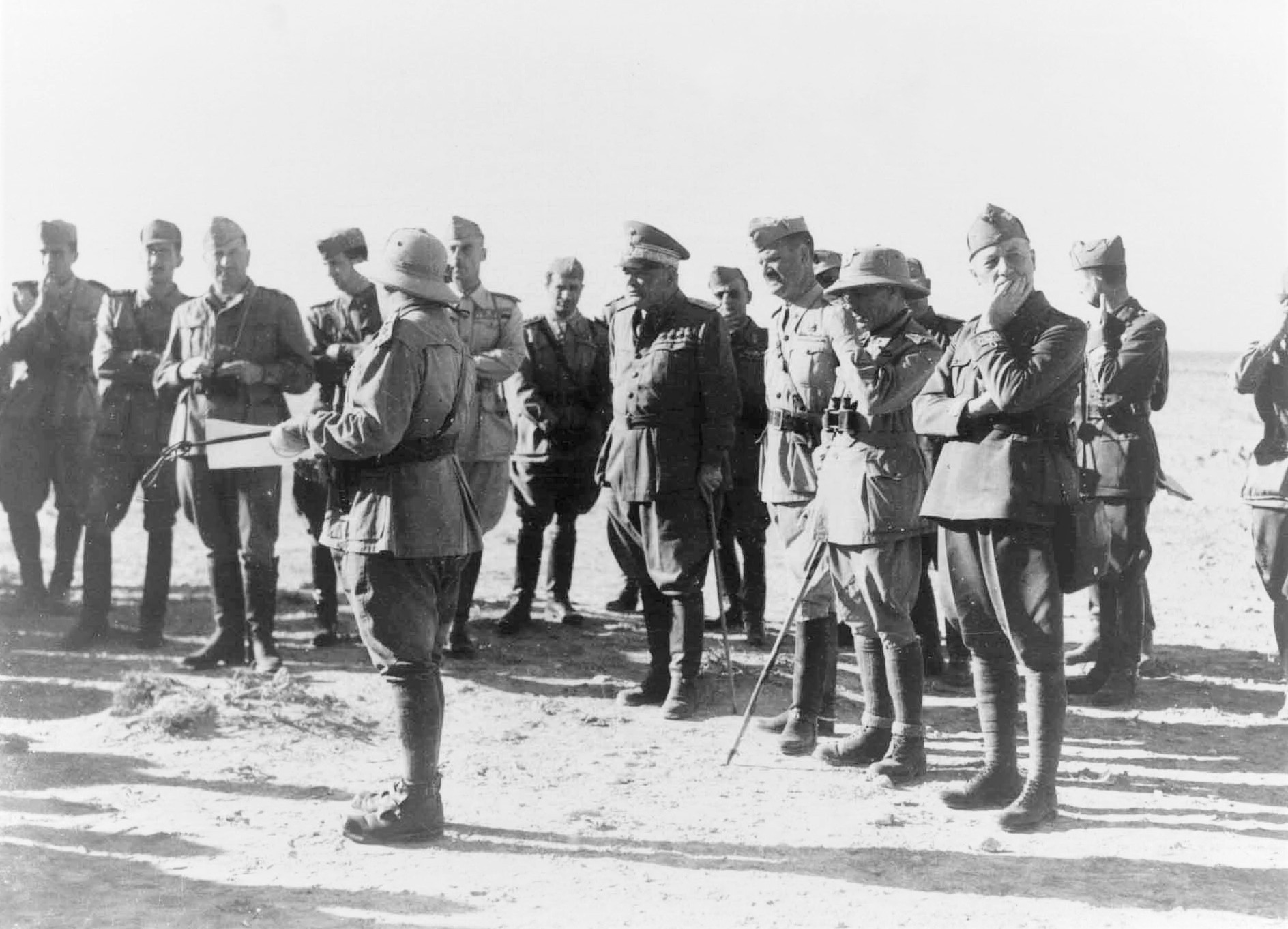
Piazzoni with General Gastone Gambara and other Italian officers in North Africa in the autumn of 1941

At the time of Italy's entry into the Second World War, in June 1940, he was in Rhodes, and shortly thereafter he was replaced by General Michele Scaroina at the command of the Regina Division and given command, on 10 September 1940 of the 101st Motorized Division "Trieste", stationed in the Po Valley. In December 1940 he was promoted to major general and sent to Albania where he commanded an ad-hoc Special Alpine Division which helped halt the Greek offensive towards Vlore, for which he was awarded the Officer's Cross of the Military Order of Savoy. In March he was repatriated and resumed command of the Trieste Division, which was then shipped to North Africa, where Piazzoni later commanded the groupment formed by the Trieste Division and the 132nd Armoured Division "Ariete", called Corpo d'Armata di Manovra, during the siege of Tobruk and the early stages of Operation Crusader.

In December 1941 he was injured in a car crash and repatriated, being replaced by General Arnaldo Azzi, and in early 1942 he was given command of the 15th Infantry Division "Bergamo", stationed in Dalmatia with headquarters in Split. On 4 April 1943 he was promoted to lieutenant general and given command of the VI Army Corps, headquartered in Dubrovnik. After the proclamation of the armistice of Cassibile on 8 September 1943, his troops initially clashed with the Germans, but on 13 September, with no prospects of receiving reinforcements, Piazzoni decided to surrender, a decision for which he was later criticized. He was then sent to Oflag 64/Z in Schokken, Poland, until its liberation by the Red Army on 21 January 1945, having refused collaboration with the Germans and the Italian Social Republic. He then dedicated himself to veteran's associations until his death, which occurred in Brescia in 1971.

Piazzoni was listed as a wanted war criminal by the Yugoslav government.
