= Flechas Azules Mixed Brigade =

In 1937, during the Spanish Civil War, Italians from the Corpo Truppe Volontarie began to serve in mixed Italo-Spanish Flechas (Arrows) units where the Italians provided the officers and technical personnel, while the Spanish served in the rank-and-file. One, the Flechas Azules Mixed Brigade "Blue Arrows" first served in Extremadura from April 1937 to the end of the War in the North.

== Order of Battle, April 1937 ==
Flechas Azules Brigade - Col. Mario Guassardo

- 1st Regimient
  - 1st Battalion
  - 2nd Battalion
  - 3rd Battalion
- 2nd Regimient
  - 1st Battalion
  - 2nd Battalion
  - 3rd Battalion
- Assault Battalion
  - 1st Company
  - 2nd Company
- Artillery Group
  - X Group 75/27
  - Battery 20mm AA

== Order of Battle, Aragon Front 1938 ==
Flechas Azules Brigade - Col. Mario Guassardo

- 3rd Regimient
  - 1st Battalion
  - 2nd Battalion
  - 3rd Battalion
  - Battery 65/17
- 4th Regimient
  - 1st Battalion
  - 2nd Battalion
  - 3rd Battalion
  - Battery 65/17
- Assault Battalion "As"
- Artillery Group
  - Xº Group de 75/27
  - Bía de 20mm
  - Bía de 37mm
- Engineer Company
- Military Police Section
- Intendencia Section
- Sanitation Section
- Division Truck Unit

The Flechas Azules Brigade was later used to form the Flechas Verdes Division and Flechas Azules Division in late 1938.

== See also ==
- Flechas Negras Mixed Brigade

== Sources ==
- de Mesa, José Luis, El regreso de las legiones: (la ayuda militar italiana a la España nacional, 1936-1939), García Hispán, Granada:España, 1994 ISBN 84-87690-33-5
