= Corno di Cavento =

Mountain in Trentino-Alto Adige, Italy

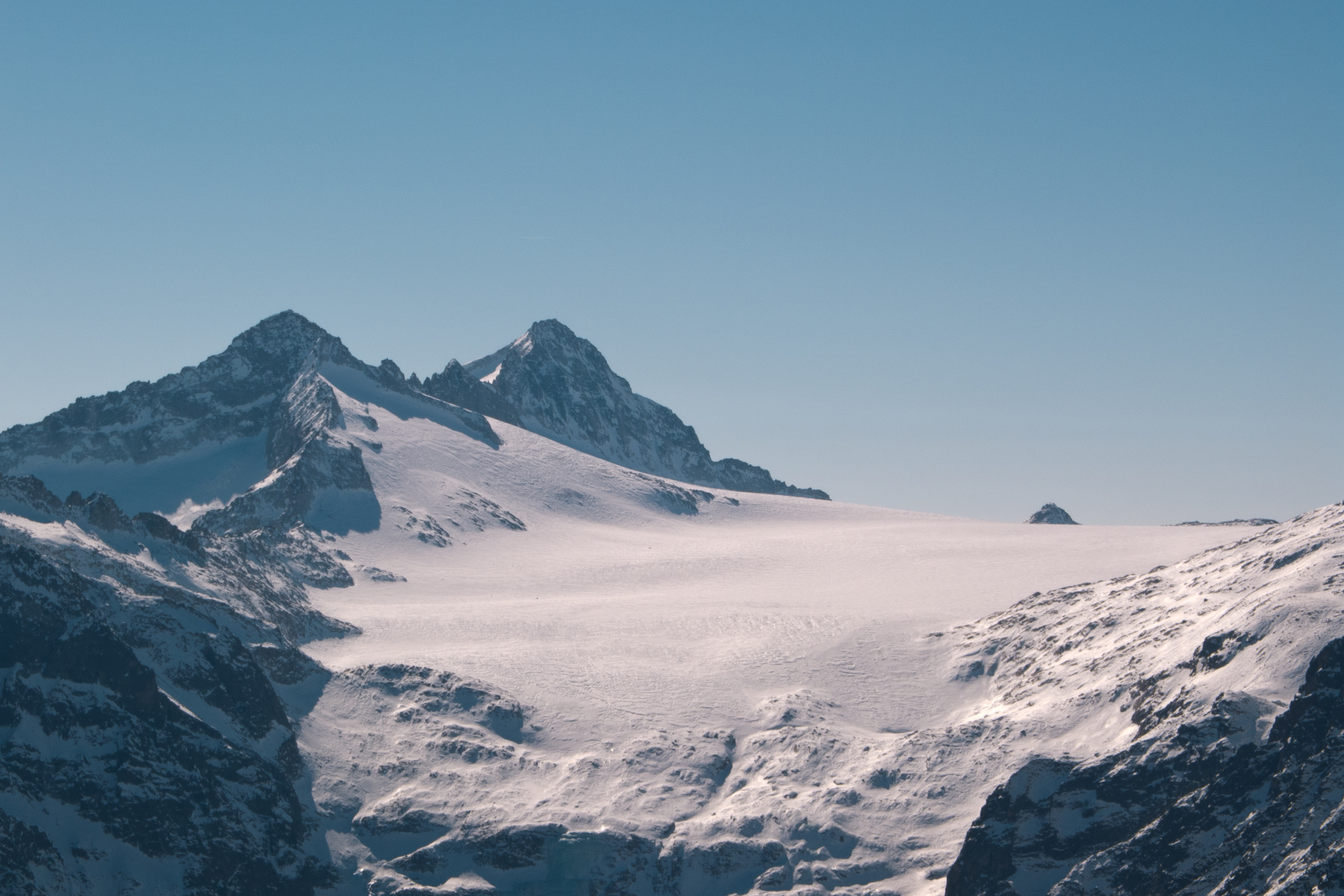
- Crozzon di Lares (left) and Corno di Cavento, seen from Cima Presena

Highest point
- Elevation: 3,402 m (11,161 ft)
- Listing: Alpine mountains above 3000 m
- Coordinates: 46°08′07″N 10°35′09″E

Geography
- Location: Trentino-Alto Adige, Italy
- Parent range: Adamello-Presanella

Climbing
- First ascent: Julius von Payer, Coronna, Griesmayer, Haller, 3 September 1868

The Corno di Cavento is a mountain in Trentino-Alto Adige, Italy. It is located in the Province of Trento, between Val Rendena and Val di Fumo.

Its summit was conquered for the first time by a young Bohemian climber, Julius von Payer, along with Coronna, Gries and Hayer, on 3 September 1868.

It was the theater of bitter fighting during World War I; held by Austro-Hungarian troops, it was captured by the Alpini on 15 June 1917, retaken by the Austro-Hungarians exactly a year later, and conquered once again by the Italians on 19 July 1918.
