= Crozzon di Lares =

Mountain in Italy

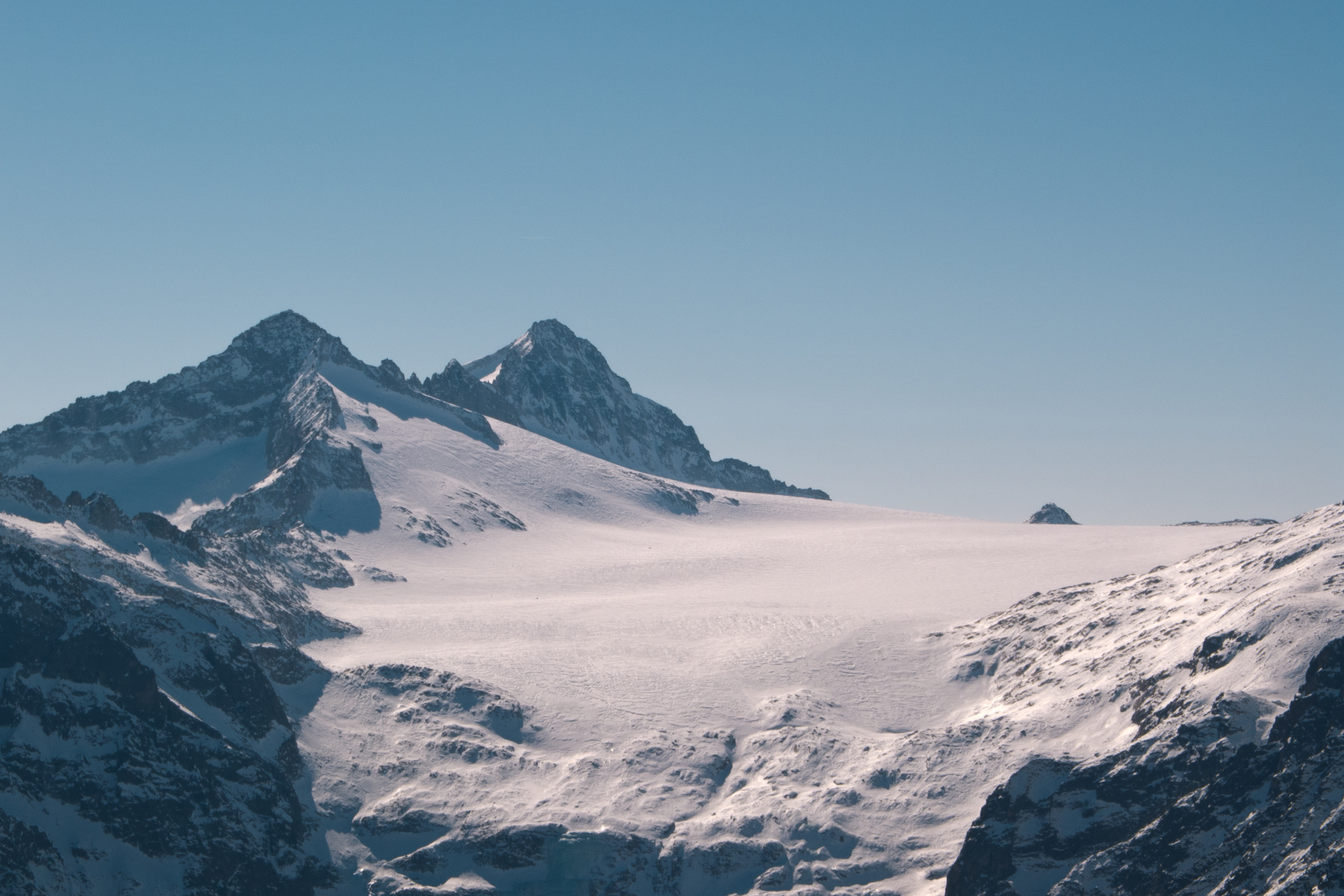
- Crozzon di Lares (left) and Corno di Cavento, seen from Cima Presena

Highest point
- Elevation: 3,354 m (11,004 ft)
- Listing: Alpine mountains above 3000 m
- Coordinates: 46°08′55″N 10°35′32″E

Geography
- Location: Trentino-Alto Adige, Italy
- Parent range: Adamello-Presanella

Climbing
- First ascent: Julius von Payer, Coronna, Griesmayer, Haller, 3 September 1868

The Crozzon di Lares is a mountain in Trentino-Alto Adige, Italy. It is located in Val Rendena, Province of Trento.

Its summit was conquered for the first time by a young Bohemian climber, Julius von Payer, along with Coronna, Gries and Hayer, on 3 September 1868; on the same day they also reached the nearby Corno di Cavento.

It was the theater of bitter fighting during World War I; held by Austro-Hungarian troops, it was captured by the Alpini on 29 April 1916. Remains of soldiers killed in World War I are sometimes found by mountaineers due to the melting of the nearby glacier.
