= Army Group West (Italy) =

Army group of Royal Italian Army in World War II

Army Group West (Italian: Gruppo d'Armate Ovest) was an Army Group of the Royal Italian Army in World War II.

== Formation ==
It was formed in northern Italy in August 1939, with headquarters in Bra; under the command of crown prince Umberto of Savoy, it consisted of the First Army (General Pietro Pintor), deployed along the Alpine border with France between Monte Granero and the Ligurian coast, and of the Fourth Army (General Alfredo Guzzoni), deployed between Monte Granero and the border with Switzerland. The Seventh Army (General Filiberto of Savoy-Genova) was later added as reserve in June 1940.

== Italian invasion of France ==
After Italy's entry into the Second World War, Army Group West carried out the offensive against France in late June 1940, although Prince Umberto's command was little more than nominal, operations being directed by the Army Chief of Staff Rodolfo Graziani, who answered directly to Mussolini.

== Reorganization and disestablishment ==
After the Armistice of Villa Incisa, the headquarters of Army Group West were moved to Turin, and the Army Group itself was renamed Army Group at Disposal (Gruppo d'Armate a disposizione). In July it was re-organized as being composed of the Second, Fourth, Sixth and Eighth armies and of the Alpine Army Corps, amassed in northern Italy for a planned invasion of the Kingdom of Yugoslavia, which was however cancelled in October 1940. The cancellation of this plan resulted in the disestablishment of Army Group at disposal on 31 October 1940, its armies being transferred to other commands and theatres.
