= Enrico Lugli =

Italian general

- Born: 4 February 1889; Rome, Kingdom of Italy
- Died: 30 March 1967 (aged 78); Rome, Italy
- Military career
- Allegiance: Kingdom of Italy; Italy
- Branch: Royal Italian Army; Italian Army
- Rank: Lieutenant General
- Commands: 225th Infantry Regiment "Arezzo"; Frontier Guard of Albania; 49th Infantry Division "Parma"
- Conflicts: Italo-Turkish War; World War I; Battles of the Isonzo; Battle of Asiago; World War II; Greco-Italian War; Operation Achse
- Awards: Silver Medal of Military Valor; Bronze Medal of Military Valor (twice); Colonial Order of the Star of Italy; Order of Merit of the Italian Republic

Enrico Lugli (Rome, 4 February 1889 – 30 March 1967) was an Italian general during World War II.

== Biography ==
He was born in Rome on 4 February 1889, and entered the Royal Military Academy of Infantry and Cavalry in Modena on 17 September 1910. While still a cadet officer he took part as a volunteer in the Italo-Turkish War in the ranks of the 59th Infantry Regiment "Calabria", earning a Bronze Medal of Military Valor during the battle of Sidi Abdallah on 3 March 1912.

After resuming the course at the Military Academy, he graduated with the rank of infantry second lieutenant on 1 April of the same year. He was then assigned to Grenadiers, and initially participated in the Great War as a lieutenant in the 1st Grenadier Regiment fighting on the Karst plateau. After promotion to captain, he commanded the 4th Battalion of the "Granatieri di Sardegna" Brigade in February–March 1916, then participating in the battle of Asiago in May–June. By the end of the war he had been awarded a Silver Medal of Military Valor and another Bronze Medal.

On 16 May 1927 he was promoted to lieutenant colonel, and was later stationed in Cyrenaica with the Royal Corps of Colonial Troops until 1936. On 1 July 1937 he was promoted to colonel and made commander of the 225th Infantry Regiment "Arezzo", part of the 53rd Infantry Division "Arezzo", which was deployed to Albania after the Italian occupation in 1939. After the entry of the Kingdom of Italy in World War II, he participated with his regiment in the Greek campaign, which ended in May 1941, after which the Division remained in Greece as an occupation force.

From 1 March 1942, two months after promotion to brigadier general, he was in command of the Frontier Guard in Albania until 1 August 1943, when he became commander of the 49th Infantry Division "Parma", based in Vlore. He still held this command when the armistice of Cassibile was announced on 8 September, and two days later he was captured by the Germans and subsequently interned in Oflag 64/Z in Schokken, Poland, when he remained till May 1945, when he was freed by the advancing Red Army. He was later promoted to major general and then to lieutenant general, and between 31 April 1959 and 6 January 1962 he was President of the National Grenadiers of Sardinia Association. He died of illness in Rome on 1 January 1966.
