= Arnaldo Azzi =

Italian general and politician

Member of the Chamber of Deputies
- In office 8 May 1948 – 24 June 1953
- Constituency: Rome

Member of the Constituent Assembly
- In office 25 June 1946 – 31 January 1948
- Constituency: Single national constituency

Personal details
- Born: 23 December 1885 Ceneselli, Rovigo, Kingdom of Italy
- Died: 25 November 1957 (aged 71) Cuneo, Italy
- Party: Italian Republican Party (1944–1948); Italian Socialist Party (after 1948)
- Profession: Military, politician

Military service
- Allegiance: Italy
- Branch/service: Royal Italian Army
- Years of service: 1910 – 1944
- Rank: Divisional general
- Unit: Infantry
- Commands: 101st Motorised Division Trieste; 41st Infantry Division Firenze
- Battles/wars: Italo-Turkish War; World War I World War II

Arnaldo Azzi (23 December 1885 – 25 November 1957) was an Italian general and politician.

During World War II, he commanded the 101st Motorised Division Trieste in the North African campaign and the 41st Infantry Division Firenze in Albania. After the armistice of Cassibile the men under his command resisted German attempts at being disarmed and joined the Albanian partisans to fight against the Axis.

After the war he was elected the Italian Constituent Assembly for the centre-left Italian Republican Party and later a member of the Chamber of Deputies for the Italian Socialist Party.

== Biography ==
=== Early military career ===
Arnaldo Azzi was born in Ceneselli, in the province of Rovigo, Veneto region, on 23 December 1885. He enlisted in the Royal Army in 1910. He took part in the Italo-Turkish war and was promoted to the rank of lieutenant on 6 September 1913. He fought in World War I, starting as company commander and finishing the conflict in command of the 1st Battalion of the 218th Regiment of the "Volturno" Infantry Brigade, with the rank of major. Wounded in action, he was decorated with the War Cross of Military Valor.

He took part in the pacification of Libya, leading a company of Eritrean colonial troops (ascari). Between 1929 and 1931 he commanded several battalions. On 17 August 1935 he was promoted to the rank of colonel, becoming commander of the 46th "Reggio" Infantry Regiment, a post that he held until 1937. Promoted to brigadier general, he became commander of the border guard units of the 2nd Army Corps.

During World War II he was deployed in the North African theater, commanding the 101st Motorized Division "Trieste" from 10 December 1941 until 30 July of the following year. During this time he took part in the victorious battle of Tobruk.

Starting on 22 November 1942 he was given command of the 41st Infantry Division "Firenze", part of the 9th Army, Army Group East operating in Albania. On 1 January 1943 he was elevated to the rank of major general.

=== In Albania ===
When the Italian government announced that it had signed an armistice with the Allies, on 8 September 1943, there were six Italian divisions operating in Albania: Firenze, Perugia, Parma, Brennero, Arezzo and Puglie. German troops immediately moved to disarm them and occupy all Italian-held territory, succeeding in most cases due to the overall confusion and lack of orders. On 11 September Germans entered Tirana and arrested the commander of Army Group East, general Ezio Rosi, extorting from him an order for Italian troops to cede heavy weapons to the Wehrmacht in exchange for the promise of safe conduct before replacing him with Renzo Dalmazzo, who was supportive of collaboration with the Axis.

While four of the six divisions were quickly disarmed, Azzi refused to obey Rosi's order. Keeping his troops together he clashed with the Germans in Krujë before undertaking an orderly retreat in the mountains. On 28 September he met with Enver Hoxha, other leaders of the Albanian resistance movement and British liaison officers for the Special Operations Executive, and agreed to form the Italian Command Troops on the Mountain (C.I.T.a.M.), which would have been part of the Albanian National Liberation Army.

The large size of the Italian contingent created many logistical difficulties, forcing it to disperse into small groups and fight a guerrilla campaign.

Eventually Azzi returned to Italy with most of his troops in June 1944. There he was given the military command of the Lazio, Abruzzi and Umbria regions in central Italy. However, in December of the same year, he was dismissed on order from the Lieutenant-General of the King, Prince Umberto di Savoia, after he had published an article calling for the democratization, depoliticization and downsizing of the Armed Forces, as well as expressing pro-republic sentiments. Azzi responded by returning the military awards he had received, at which point he was stripped of his rank.

He would be reinstated to his prior rank after Italy became a republic.

=== Later life ===
In 1946 he was elected to the Constituent Assembly for the Italian Republican Party. Azzi would quit the party in January 1948, in disagreement with the leadership's decision to support Prime Minister Alcide De Gasperi's removal of Communist and Socialist ministers. He founded the short-lived Popular Republican Alliance, which ran as part of the Popular Democratic Front in the 1948 election, when Azzi was reelected. The party would later merge into the Italian Socialist Party.

During the 1948–1953 term he was vice chair of the Defense Committee of the Chamber of Deputies.

He died in Cuneo on 25 November 1957, aged 71.

== Personal life ==
He was a freemason, a member of the Grand Orient of Italy. On 11 March 1945 he received the 31st degree patent of the Ancient and Accepted Scottish Rite of Freemasonry.

== Honours and awards ==
- Kingdom of Italy: Knight of the Military Order of Savoy
- Kingdom of Italy: War Cross of Military Valor
- Kingdom of Italy: Commemorative Medal for the Italo-Austrian War 1915–1918
- Kingdom of Italy: Commemorative Medal of the Unity of Italy
- Kingdom of Italy: Allied Victory Medal
- Kingdom of Italy: Knight of the Order of the Crown of Italy
- Kingdom of Italy: Officer of the Order of the Crown of Italy

== Bibliography ==
- Viscardo Azzi (2010). Ugo Mursia (ed.). I disobbedienti della 9ª Armata. Albania 1943-1945. ISBN 978-88-425-4185-1.
- Alberto Becherelli; Andrea Carteny; Fabrizio Giardini (2013). Edizioni Nuova Cultura (ed.). L'Albania indipendente e le relazioni italo-albanesi (1912-2012). ISBN 978-88-6812-135-8.
- Piero Crociani; Pier Paolo Battistelli (2011). Osprey Publishing Company (ed.). Italian Army Elite Units & Special Forces 1940-43. ISBN 978-1-84908-595-3.
