= List of twin towns and sister cities in Brazil =

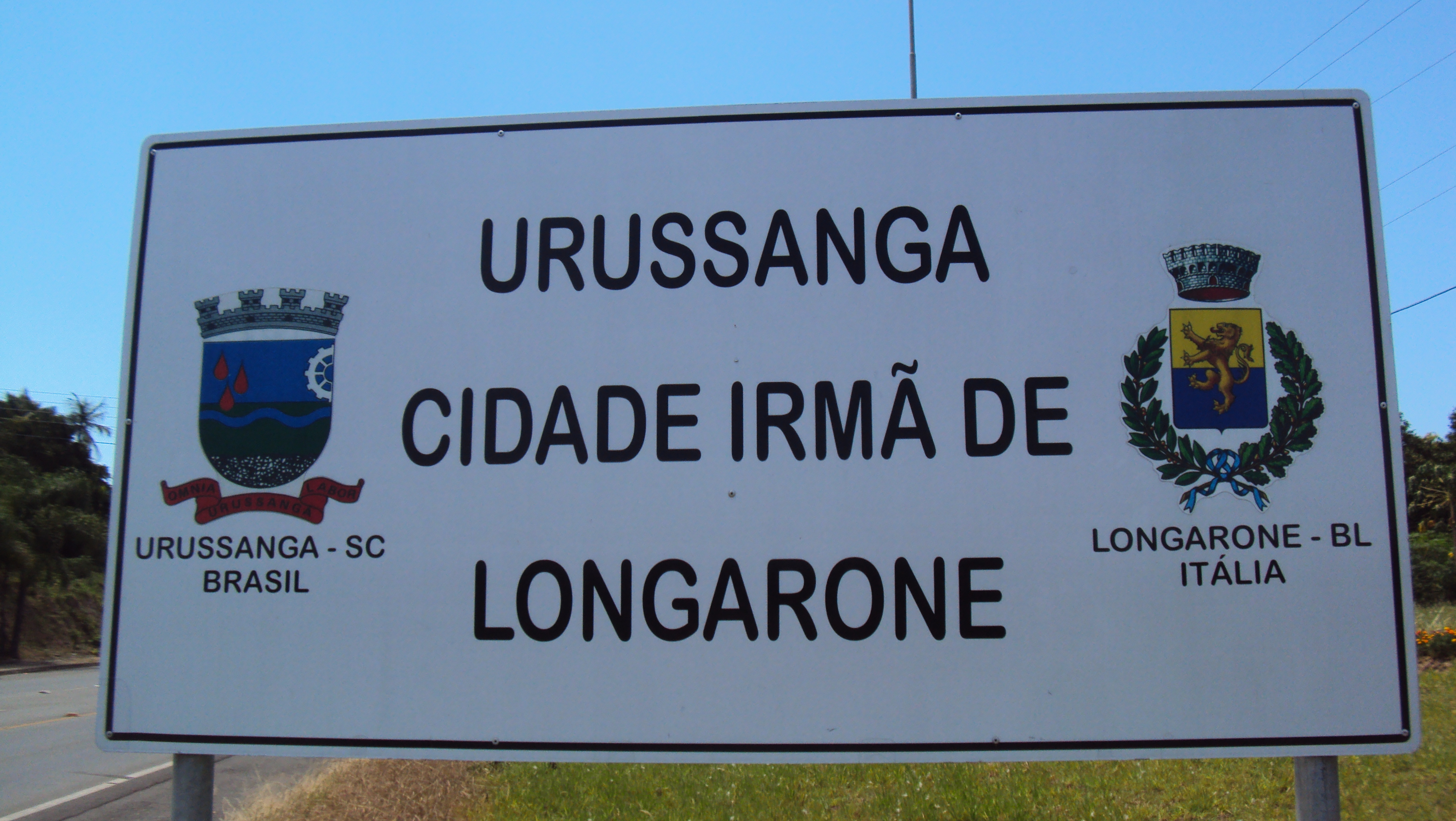
A sign in Urussanga with its twin town, Longarone

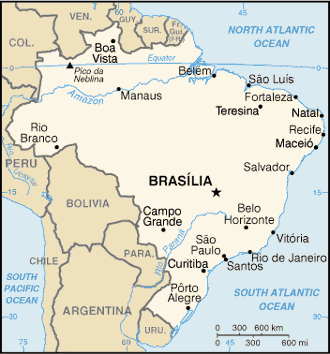
Map of Brazil

This is a list of municipalities in Brazil which have standing links to local communities in other countries. In most cases, the association, especially when formalised by local government, is known as "town twinning" (usually in Europe) or "sister cities" (usually in the rest of the world).

== A ==
Aquiraz

- Frederick, United States
- São Vicente, Cape Verde

Araçariguama

- Binhu (Wuxi), China

Assis Chateaubriand

- Seixal, Portugal

== B ==
Balneário Camboriú

- Pingdingshan, China
- Punta del Este, Uruguay

Barra Mansa

- Bengbu, China

Barueri

- Ourém, Portugal

Belém

- Aveiro, Portugal
- Campinas, Brazil
- Fort-de-France, Martinique, France
- Shaoxing, China

Belmonte

- Belmonte, Portugal

Belo Horizonte

- Cuenca, Ecuador
- Fort Lauderdale, United States
- Granada, Spain
- Havana, Cuba
- Homs, Syria
- Jiangyin, China
- Lagos, Nigeria
- Luanda, Angola
- Masaya, Nicaragua
- Newark, United States
- Tripoli, Libya
- Tegucigalpa, Honduras
- Zahlé, Lebanon

Bento Gonçalves

- Brentonico, Italy
- Cartaxo, Portugal
- Isera, Italy
- Luján de Cuyo, Argentina
- Mori, Italy
- Nogaredo, Italy
- Rovereto, Italy
- Terragnolo, Italy
- Trambileno, Italy
- Villa Lagarina, Italy

Blumenau

- Campinas, Brazil
- Osorno, Chile
- Petrópolis, Brazil

Bragança Paulista

- Bragança, Portugal

Brasília

- Asunción, Paraguay
- Buenos Aires, Argentina
- Gaza City, Palestine
- Havana, Cuba
- Khartoum, Sudan
- Kyiv, Ukraine
- Luxor, Egypt
- Montevideo, Uruguay
- Tehran, Iran
- Xi'an, China

== C ==
Cabedelo

- Viana do Castelo, Portugal

Cabo Frio

- Huzhou, China
- Ílhavo, Portugal

Campinas

- Asunción, Paraguay
- Auroville, India
- Belém, Brazil
- Blumenau, Brazil
- Cabinda, Angola
- Camanducaia, Brazil
- Cascais, Portugal
- Concepción, Chile
- Córdoba, Argentina
- Cotorro (Havana), Cuba
- Daloa, Ivory Coast
- Fuzhou, China
- Gifu, Japan
- Indianapolis, United States
- Jericho, Palestine
- Malito, Italy
- Peruíbe, Brazil
- Salinas, Brazil
- San Diego, United States
- Ubatuba, Brazil
- Viseu, Portugal
- Zaragoza, Spain

Campo Grande

- Puerto Tirol, Argentina

Canoas

- Morón, Argentina
- Quilmes, Argentina

Canoinhas

- Sterling, United States

Cantanhede

- Cantanhede, Portugal

Caruaru

- Vila Nova de Famalicão, Portugal

Caxias do Sul

- Changzhou, China
- Little Rock, United States

Chapecó

- Asunción, Paraguay
- Medellín, Colombia
- Ninghai, China
- Pergamino, Argentina

Colombo

- Heze, China

Congonhas

- Matosinhos, Portugal

Criciúma

- Huaibei, China
- Vittorio Veneto, Italy

Cubatão

- Águas de São Pedro, Brazil
- Aveiro, Portugal
- Conchal, Brazil
- Melipilla, Chile
- Peruíbe, Brazil
- Serra Negra, Brazil
- Taquaritinga, Brazil

Curitiba

- Asunción, Paraguay
- Changzhou, China
- Coimbra, Portugal
- Columbus, United States
- Guadalajara, Mexico
- Hangzhou, China
- Himeji, Japan
- Jacksonville, United States
- Kraków, Poland
- Miami-Dade County, United States
- Montevideo, Uruguay
- Orlando, United States
- Santa Cruz de la Sierra, Bolivia
- Suwon, South Korea
- Treviso Province, Italy

== D ==
Diamantina

- Daytona Beach, United States

Dourados

- Iquique, Chile
- Kearney, United States

== E ==
Embu das Artes

- Hino, Japan

== F ==
Farroupilha

- Cadaval, Portugal
- Latina, Italy

Florianópolis

- Angra do Heroísmo, Portugal
- Asunción, Paraguay
- Córdoba, Argentina
- Fernando de la Mora, Paraguay
- Havana, Cuba
- Luján, Argentina
- Ponta Delgada, Portugal
- Praia da Vitória, Portugal
- Presidente Franco, Paraguay
- Roanoke, United States

Fortaleza

- Ferreira do Alentejo, Portugal
- Lisbon, Portugal
- Miami Beach, United States
- Montese, Italy
- Natal, Brazil
- Praia, Cape Verde
- Sal, Cape Verde
- Sines, Portugal

Foz do Iguaçu

- Hernandarias, Paraguay
- Jerez de la Frontera, Spain
- Jericho, Palestine
- Yichang, China

Franco da Rocha

- Stepanakert, Azerbaijan

== G ==
Goiânia

- Chittagong, Bangladesh
- Uberaba, Brazil
- Xinzhou, China

Gramado

- Angra do Heroísmo, Portugal
- Levico Terme, Italy
- Maldonado, Uruguay
- Óbidos, Portugal
- Puerto Varas, Chile

Guarapuava

- Rastatt, Germany

Guararapes

- Natori, Japan

Guarujá

- Cascais, Portugal

Guarulhos

- Avellaneda, Argentina
- Boyeros (Havana), Cuba
- Cuenca, Ecuador
- Ecatepec, Mexico
- Maputo, Mozambique
- Mejicanos, El Salvador
- Quito, Ecuador

== I ==
Igarassu

- Viana do Alentejo, Portugal
- Viana do Castelo, Portugal

Ilhéus

- Davenport, United States

Itajaí

- Melipilla, Chile
- Pompano Beach, United States
- Sodegaura, Japan
- Viana do Castelo, Portugal
- Xinxiang, China

Itanhaém

- Marbella, Spain

Iúna

- Castelluccio Superiore, Italy

== J ==
Jandira

- Kameoka, Japan

Joinville

- Chesapeake, United States
- Joinville-le-Pont, France
- Schaffhausen, Switzerland
- Spišská Nová Ves, Slovakia
- Zhengzhou, China

Jundiaí

- Havana, Cuba
- Iwakuni, Japan
- Rugao, China
- Tai'an, China
- Trenton, United States

== L ==
Londrina

- Guimarães, Portugal
- Modena, Italy
- León, Nicaragua
- Nago, Japan
- Toledo, United States
- Zhenjiang, China

== M ==
Macapá

- Kourou, French Guiana, France
- Ouidah, Benin

Mairiporã

- Stepanakert, Azerbaijan

Manaus

- Braga, Portugal

Marília

- Higashihiroshima, Japan

Maringá

- Caserta, Italy
- General San Martín, Argentina
- Kakogawa, Japan
- Leiria, Portugal

Mogi das Cruzes

- Seki, Japan
- Tournai, Belgium
- Toyama, Japan

Mostardas

- Aprilia, Italy

== N ==
Natal

- Bethlehem, Palestine
- Córdoba, Argentina
- Fortaleza, Brazil
- Guadalajara, Mexico
- Porto Alegre, Brazil

Niterói

- Jerusalem, Israel
- São Gonçalo, Brazil

Nova Friburgo

- Santo Tirso, Portugal

Nova Odessa

- Agugliaro, Italy
- Jelgava, Latvia
- Odesa, Ukraine
- Santa Rita do Passa Quatro, Brazil

Nova Petrópolis

- Sunchales, Argentina

Nova Prata

- Cittadella, Italy
- Noblesville, United States

Novo Hamburgo

- Atlántida, Uruguay
- Canelones, Uruguay
- Elda, Spain
- León, Mexico
- São João da Madeira, Portugal

== O ==
Oeiras

- Oeiras, Portugal

Olímpia

- Belmonte, Portugal

Olinda

- Colonia del Sacramento, Uruguay
- Vila do Conde, Portugal

Osasco

- Gyumri, Armenia
- Jining, China
- Osasco, Italy
- Tsu, Japan
- Viana, Angola
- Xuzhou, China

Ouro Preto

- Belmonte, Portugal
- Ourém, Portugal

== P ==
Paraíso do Tocantins

- Tarouca, Portugal

Paraty

- Capri, Italy
- Cunha, Brazil
- Ílhavo, Portugal

Pelotas

- Aracati, Brazil
- Aveiro, Portugal
- Colonia del Sacramento, Uruguay
- Suzu, Japan

Petrolina

- Castelo Branco, Portugal

Petrópolis

- Areal, Brazil
- Blumenau, Brazil
- Orleans, Brazil
- Sintra, Portugal

Piracicaba

- Amadora, Portugal
- Seongnam, South Korea

Poços de Caldas

- Caldas da Rainha, Portugal

Pomerode

- Torgelow, Germany

Porto Alegre

- Horta, Portugal
- Kanazawa, Japan
- Morano Calabro, Italy
- Natal, Brazil
- Newark, United States
- La Plata, Argentina
- Punta del Este, Uruguay
- Portalegre, Portugal
- Ribeira Grande, Portugal
- Rosario, Argentina
- Suzhou, China
- Tampa, United States

Porto Seguro

- Belmonte, Portugal
- Fafe, Portugal
- Setúbal, Portugal
- Trancoso, Portugal
- Viana do Alentejo, Portugal
- Viana do Castelo, Portugal

Porto Velho

- Jinan, China

Promissão

- Silistra, Bulgaria

Prudentópolis

- Ternopil, Ukraine

== Q ==
Queimados

- Jiujiang, China

== R ==
Recife

- Chengdu, China
- Guangzhou, China
- Porto, Portugal

Registro

- Nakatsugawa, Japan

Ribeirão Preto

- Bucaramanga, Colombia
- San Leandro, United States
- Teramo, Italy

Rio de Janeiro

- Arganil, Portugal
- Athens, Greece
- Atlanta, United States
- Baku, Azerbaijan
- Barcelona, Spain
- Barranquilla, Colombia
- Beijing, China
- Beirut, Lebanon
- Braga, Portugal
- Buenos Aires, Argentina
- Busan, South Korea
- Cape Town, South Africa
- Caracas, Venezuela
- Cologne, Germany
- Cusco, Peru
- Espinho, Portugal
- Guimarães, Portugal
- Guiyang, China
- Havana, Cuba
- Hebron, Palestine
- Istanbul, Turkey
- Jerusalem, Israel
- Kyiv, Ukraine
- Kobe, Japan
- Lahore, Pakistan
- Lisbon, Portugal
- Liverpool, England, United Kingdom
- Madrid, Spain
- Managua, Nicaragua
- Maputo, Mozambique
- Mar del Plata, Argentina
- Montevideo, Uruguay
- Montpellier, France
- Montreal, Canada
- Newark, United States
- Nice, France
- Oklahoma City, United States
- Olhão, Portugal
- Parelhas, Brazil
- La Paz, Bolivia
- Praia, Cape Verde
- Ra'anana, Israel
- Ramat Gan, Israel
- Rufisque, Senegal
- Saint Petersburg, Russia
- Samarkand, Uzbekistan
- San José, Costa Rica
- Santa Comba, Spain
- Santa Cruz de Tenerife, Spain
- Santo Domingo, Dominican Republic
- São Borja, Brazil
- Tianjin, China
- Tunis, Tunisia
- Viana do Castelo, Portugal
- Vila Nova de Gaia, Portugal
- Viseu, Portugal
- Warsaw, Poland

== S ==
Salvador

- Angra do Heroísmo, Portugal
- Campobasso, Italy
- Florence, Italy
- Harbin, China
- Havana, Cuba
- Ifẹ, Nigeria
- Jerusalem, Israel
- Kingston, Jamaica
- Lisbon, Portugal
- Los Angeles, United States
- Luanda, Angola
- Pontevedra, Spain
- Sciacca, Italy
- Valparaíso, Chile

Santa Bárbara

- Jericho, Palestine

Santa Cruz Cabrália

- Belmonte, Portugal
- Felgueiras, Portugal
- Manteigas, Portugal

Santa Gertrudes

- Novellara, Italy

Santarém

- Santarém, Portugal

Santo André

- Ribeira Brava, Cape Verde
- Takasaki, Japan

Santos

- Alajuela, Costa Rica
- Ansião, Portugal
- Arouca, Portugal
- Cádiz, Spain
- Callao, Peru
- Coimbra, Portugal
- Colón, Panama
- Constanța, Romania
- Fernando de la Mora, Paraguay
- Funchal, Portugal
- Havana, Cuba
- Kenitra, Morocco
- Nagasaki, Japan
- Ningbo, China
- Porto, Portugal
- Rizhao, China
- Shimonoseki, Japan
- Trieste, Italy
- Ulsan, South Korea
- Ushuaia, Argentina
- Veracruz, Mexico

São Bernardo do Campo

- General San Martín, Argentina
- Havana, Cuba
- Managua, Nicaragua
- Marostica, Italy
- Shūnan, Japan
- Vittorio Veneto, Italy

São João Nepomuceno

- Nepomuk, Czech Republic

São José do Belmonte

- Belmonte, Portugal

São José dos Campos

- Kadoma, Japan

São José dos Pinhais

- Montemor-o-Velho, Portugal
- Zibo, China

São Luís

- Huế, Vietnam
- Nairobi, Kenya
- Tramonti, Italy

São Mateus

- Sondrio, Italy

São Paulo

- Abidjan, Ivory Coast
- Asunción, Paraguay
- Barcelona, Spain
- Belmonte, Portugal
- Cluj-Napoca, Romania
- Havana, Cuba
- Lima, Peru
- Macau, China
- Miami-Dade County, United States
- Milan, Italy
- Osaka, Japan
- La Paz, Bolivia
- San Cristóbal de La Laguna, Spain
- Santiago, Chile
- Santiago de Compostela, Spain
- Seoul, South Korea
- Shanghai, China
- Yerevan, Armenia

São Sebastião

- Fort Lauderdale, United States

São Vicente

- Ansião, Portugal
- Asunción, Paraguay
- Belmonte, Portugal
- Corrientes, Argentina
- Havana, Cuba
- Holguín, Cuba
- Naha, Japan
- Resistencia, Argentina
- Santarém, Portugal
- Vila Viçosa, Portugal

Sorocaba

- Anyang, South Korea
- Nanchang, China
- Wuxi, China

Suzano

- Komatsu, Japan

== U ==
Uberaba

- Goiânia, Brazil
- Hyderabad, India
- Ongole, India
- Reynosa, Mexico

Umuarama

- Castelo Branco, Portugal

Urussanga

- Longarone, Italy

== V ==
Viana

- Viana do Alentejo, Portugal
- Viana do Castelo, Portugal

Vila Velha

- Qingdao, China

Vinhedo

- Bozhou, China

Vitória

- Cascais, Portugal
- Iquique, Chile
- Zhuhai, China
