= 158th Infantry Division "Zara" =

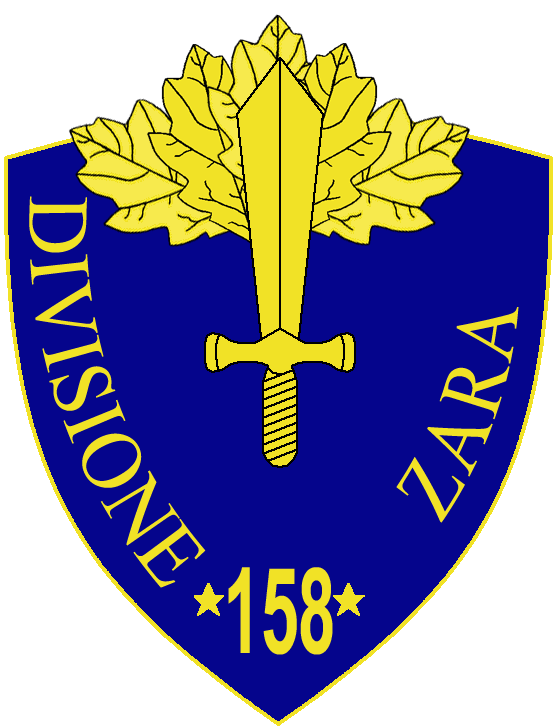
- 158th Infantry Division "Zara" insignia
- Active: 1 September 1942– 9 September 1943
- Country: Kingdom of Italy
- Branch: Royal Italian Army
- Type: Infantry
- Size: Division
- Garrison/HQ: Zadar
- Engagements: World War II

Insignia
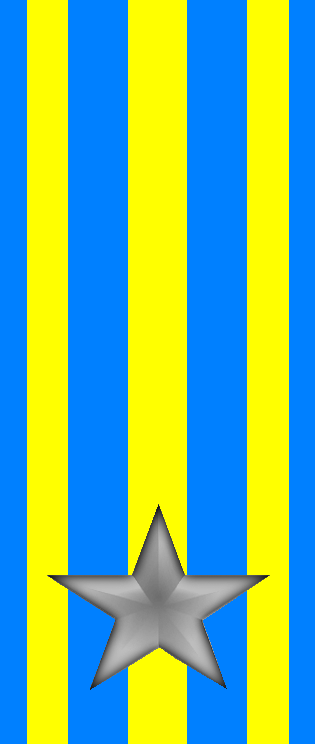
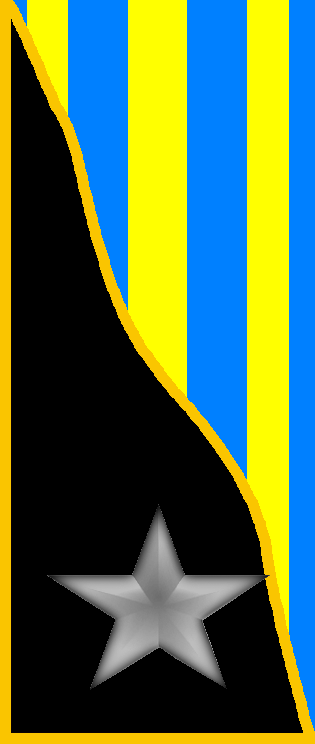
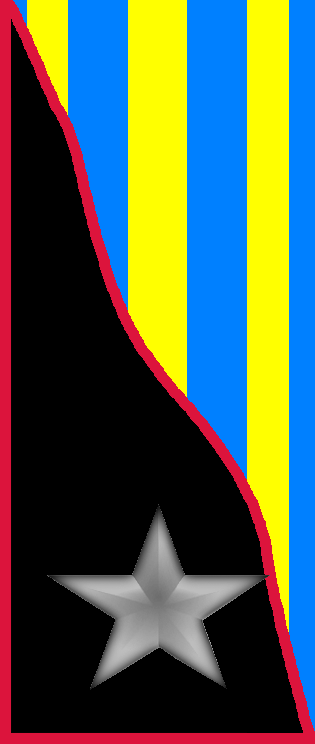
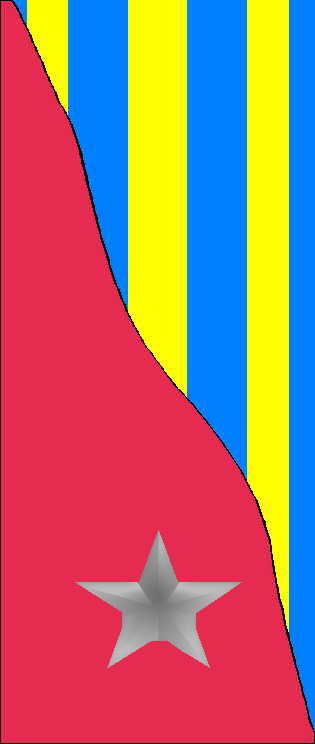
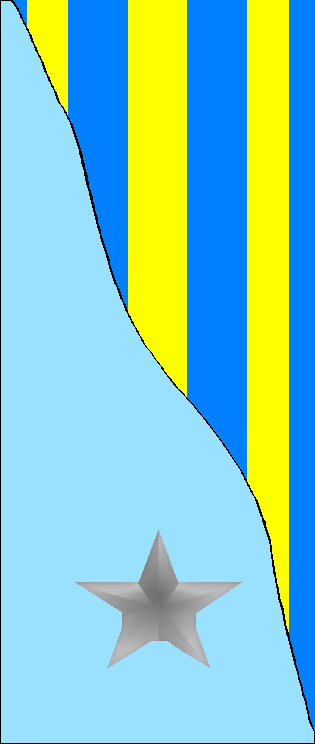
- Identification symbol: Zara Division gorget patches

The 158th Infantry Division "Zara" (Italian: 158ª Divisione di fanteria "Zara") was an infantry division of the Royal Italian Army during World War II. The Zara was formed on 1 September 1942 and named for the city of Zadar (Italian: Zara). The Zara was classified as an occupation infantry division. The division remained on the Dalmatian coast until it was disbanded on 9 September 1943 in the wake of the announcement of the Armistice of Cassibile.

== History ==
On 1 January 1936 the Zara Garrison Troops Command was raised in the Italian exclave of Zara. The Troops Command consisted of the Ground Command with two machine gun battalions and one Bersaglieri battalion, the Artillery Command with three artillery groups, and the Coastal Command with minor coastal defense units.

=== World War II ===
During the initial phase of the Axis' Invasion of Yugoslavia the Troops Command remained passive until 12 April 1941, when its units entered Yugoslavia and occupied Biograd na Moru, Nin, Obrovac, Benkovac, Skradin and Knin, where the Zara units met the vanguard of the 133rd Armored Division "Littorio".

On 1 September 1942 the Troops Command was reformed as 158th Infantry Division "Zara" and activated the 291st and 292th infantry regiments, and the 158th Artillery Regiment. The division was responsible for the Dalmatian coast south of Zadar, with units based in Knin, Split, Kaštela, Šibenik, Trogir and on the major islands along the coast. During its existence the division was engaged in anti-partisan activities, with heavy fighting occurring in Benkovac. After the announcement of the Armistice of Cassibile on 8 September 1943 the division was disbanded by invading German forces.

== Organization ==
158th Infantry Division "Zara" organization

- 158th Infantry Division "Zara", in Zadar
  - Headquarters
    - Command Company
    - 113th Carabinieri Section
    - 141st Field Post Office
    - 158th Infantry Division Command Transport Squad
  - 291st Infantry Regiment "Zara" (former Ground Command, Zara Garrison Troops Command)
    - Command Company
    - Fusilier Battalion "Diaz"
    - Bersaglieri Cyclists Battalion "Zara" (replaced by the Fusilier Battalion "Traù" on 18 May 1943)
    - Machine Gun Battalion "Spalato"
    - Cannons Company (47/32 mod. 35 anti-tank guns)
  - 292nd Infantry Regiment "Zara" (former Coastal Command, Zara Garrison Troops Command)
    - Command Company
    - Fusilier Battalion "Cadorna"
    - Fusilier Battalion "Rismondo"
    - Machine Gun Battalion "Dalmazia" (replaced by the III Fusilier Battalion on 24 May 1943)
    - Cannons Company (47/32 mod. 35 anti-tank guns)
  - 158th Artillery Regiment "Zara" (former Artillery Command, Zara Garrison Troops Command)
    - Command Unit
    - I Group "Ederle" (100/17 mod. 14 howitzers)
    - II Group "Chiarle" (75/27 mod. 06 field guns)
    - III Group "Fadini" (65/17 mod. 13 mountain guns; replaced in January 1943 with 75/13 mod. 15 mountain guns)
    - 185th Anti-aircraft battery (20/65 mod. 35 anti-aircraft guns)
    - Ammunition and Supply Unit
  - CCCXX Mixed Engineer Battalion
    - 158th Engineer Company
    - 258th Telegraph and Radio Operators Company
  - 158th Medical Section
    - 2 × Field hospitals
    - 1 × Surgical unit
  - 158th Supply Section

In 1943 the following units were attached to the division:

- 11th Bersaglieri Regiment
  - Command Company
  - XV Battalion
  - XXVII Battalion
  - XXXIII Battalion
  - 11th Motorcyclists Company
  - 11th Anti-tank Company (47/32 mod. 35 anti-tank guns)
- 107th CC.NN. Legion "Rismondo"
  - CVII CC.NN. Battalion
  - 107th CC.NN. Machine Gun Company
- 60th Guardia alla Frontiera Artillery Grouping

== CROWCASS ==
The names of five men attached to the division can be found in the Central Registry of War Criminals and Security Suspects (CROWCASS) set up by the Anglo-American Supreme Headquarters Allied Expeditionary Force in 1945. The names can be found at: Central Registry of War Criminals and Security Suspects from the Kingdom of Italy.

== Commanding officers ==
The division's commanding officers were:

- Generale di Brigata Carlo Viale (1 September 1942 – 9 September 1943)
