= Forra del Lupo =

WWI military walkway in Trentino, Italy

The Forra del Lupo (English: The Wolf's Gorge, German: Wolfsschlucht ) is a military walkway consisting of an Austro-Hungarian trench, starting from Serrada and stretching to the 1,670 meters Dosso del Sommo fort (Werk Serrada), and was part of one of the most important Austrian "works" of the entire "southern" front of the World War I, within the municipal territory of Folgaria and Terragnolo in Trentino.

== Description ==
Its length is 4.8 kilometers with a difference in altitude of over 400 metres. It follows the entire orographic profile towards the Terragnolo valley. In essence, it is a trench carved into the rock, with loopholes and artillery emplacements as well as some cave shelters. In the Cimbrian language the route is called Klebostuo, the fissured rock, as halfway through the itinerary there is a narrow passage between high rock walls. The reference to the wolf could have derived from the fact that the wind channeling into the narrow throat produces sounds similar to a howl or hiss. In fact the Austrians also called the place the Dragon Gorge, Drachenschlucht.

It was part of the so-called Tiroler Widerstandslinie, i.e. the line of maximum resistance that the Austro-Hungarians built between 1914 and May 1915 after the decision to withdraw from the political border onto more easily defensible lines. In fact, the line continued from the gorge to the west towards Monte Finonchio and then descended to Monte Ghello and Rovereto, and to the east it connected to the fortified line of Forte Dosso del Sommo.

The Lupo gorge was intended to block the Italian advance towards the Folgaria plateau, and required the overcoming of numerous engineering and logistical difficulties with the construction of tunnels, caves, stairs dug into the rock and sheer passages. It was initially occupied by Standschützen units who repelled various Italian attacks between the summer of 1915 and the start of the Austro-Hungarian offensive in May 1916. After the Strafexpedition and the movement of the line on the Pasubio massif and the Borcola pass it became a backward line.

It was discovered while viewing paintings and photographs of Austro-Hungarian army soldiers. It was in a state of abandonment until its restoration was completed in 2015, which allowed the inclusion of its route as a SAT 137 hiking itinerary within the "Trentino Memory Park".

== Gallery ==
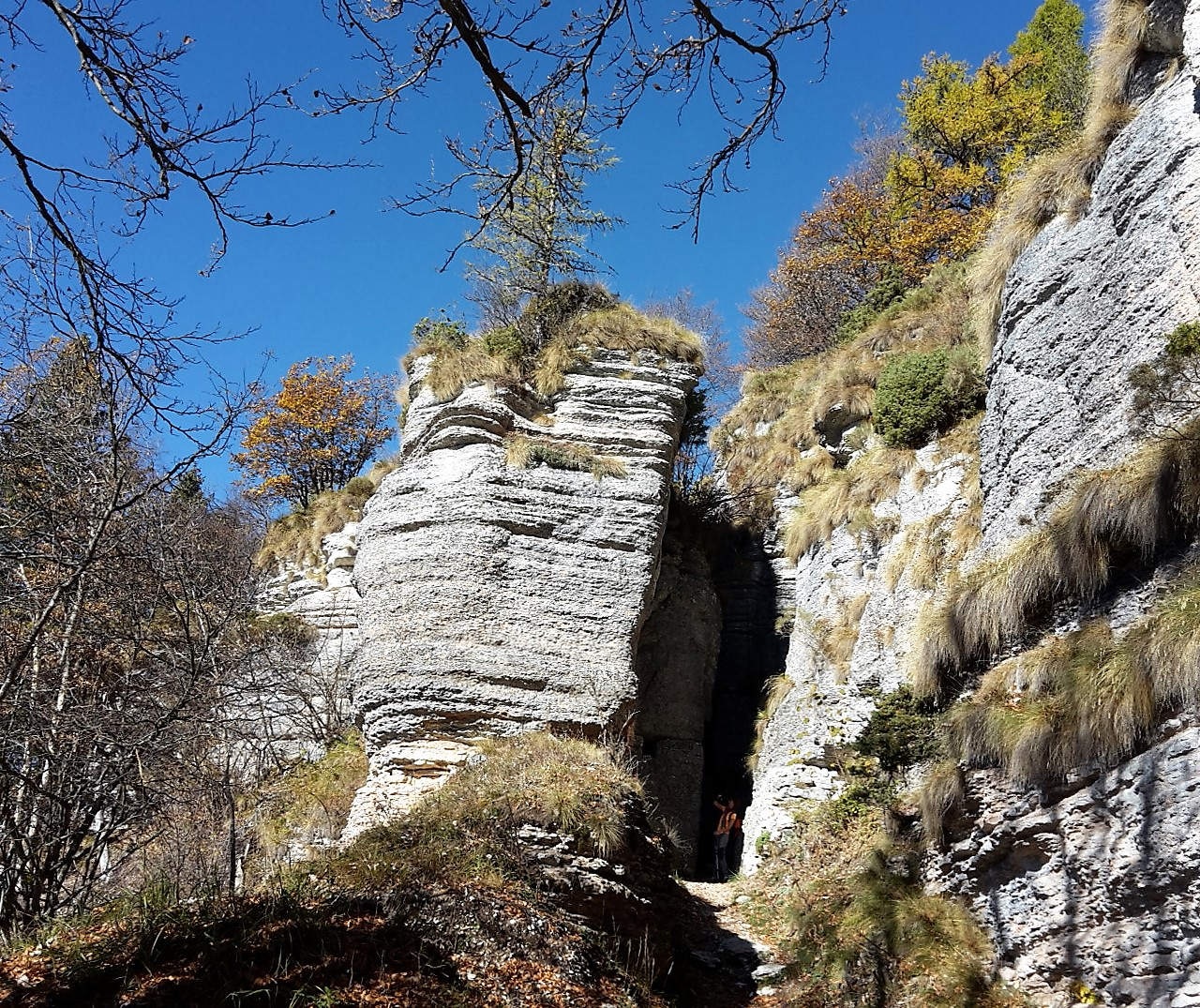
The way out of the gorge

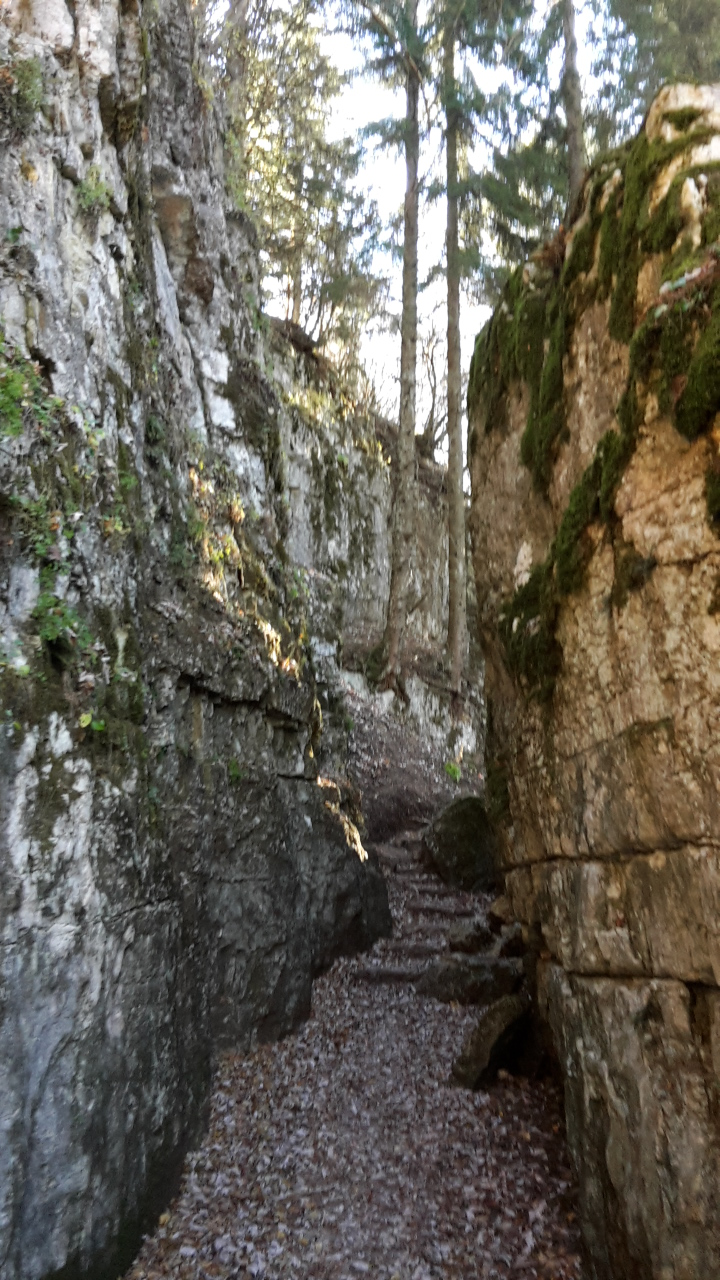
Another path along the gorge

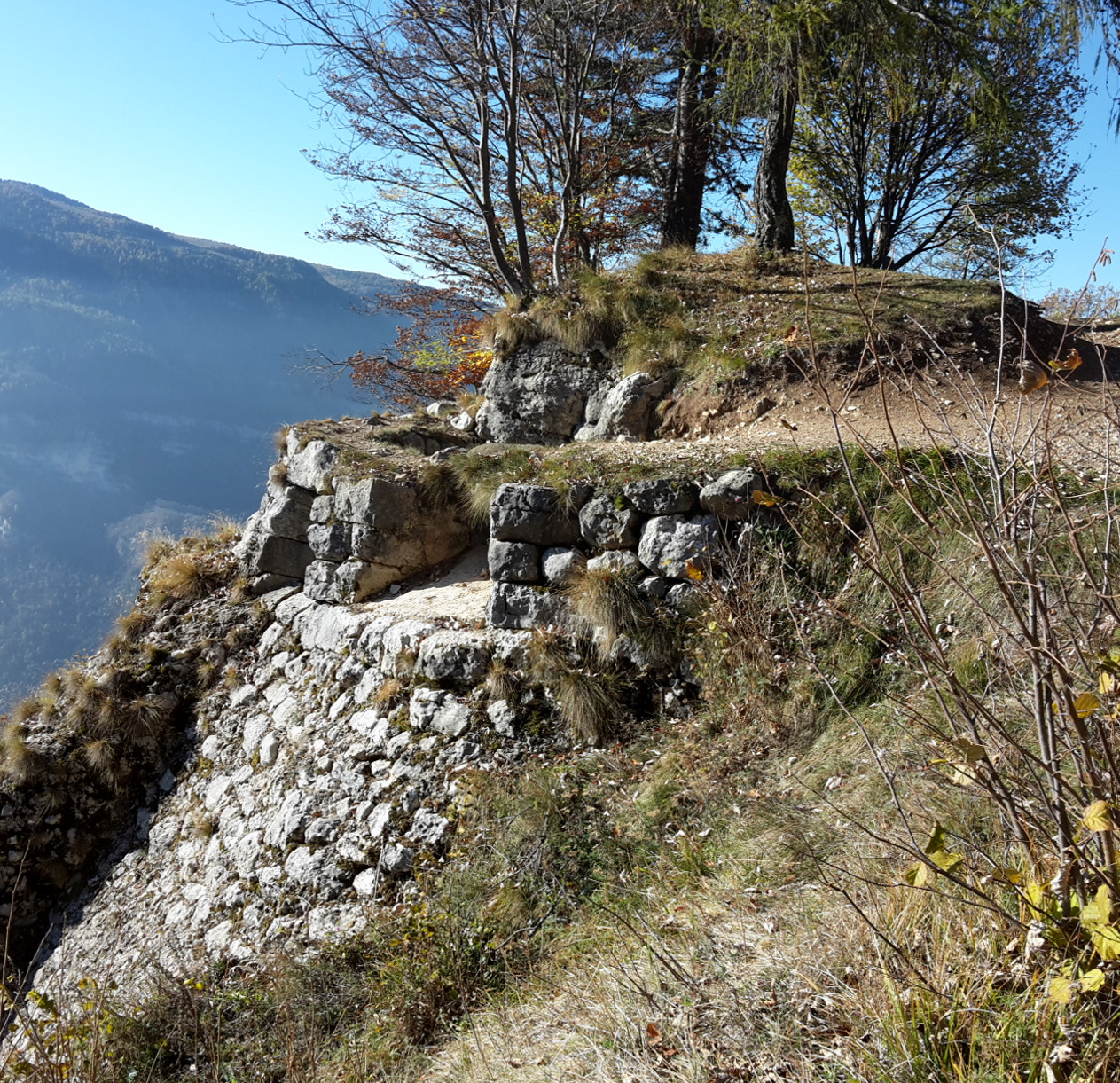
One of the batteries along the path leading to the Forra del Lupo
