= Gervasio Bitossi =

Italian general during World War II

- Born: 2 October 1884; Livorno, Kingdom of Italy
- Died: 26 June 1951 (aged 66); Rome, Italy
- Military career
- Allegiance: Kingdom of Italy
- Branch: Royal Italian Army
- Service years: 1903–1946
- Rank: Lieutenant General
- Commands: Cavalleggeri Guide Regiment; 1st Mixed Regiment; Central School of Fast Troops; Assault Division Littorio; 133rd Armoured Division Littorio; II Corps
- Conflicts: World War I; Battles of the Isonzo; Spanish Civil War; World War II; Battle of the Western Alps; Axis invasion of Yugoslavia; Battle of Gazala; First battle of El Alamein; Second battle of El Alamein
- Awards: Silver Medal of Military Valour; War Merit Cross; Military Order of Savoy; Order of the Crown of Italy; Order of Saints Maurice and Lazarus

Gervasio Bitossi (2 October 1884 – 26 June 1951) was an Italian general during World War II, pioneer of tank warfare in the Royal Italian Army and among Italy's main experts in the field of mechanized warfare.

== Biography ==
On 16 October 1900 he enrolled at the Nunziatella Military School in Naples, and in 1903 he entered the Military Academy of Modena, graduating on 14 September 1906 with the rank of cavalry second lieutenant 1906, assigned to the 8th Regiment "Lancers of Montebello", in Pinerolo.

On 23 September 1912 he married Clementina Coronedi, with whom he would have four children. On 22 July 1915, after Italy's entrance into the First World War, he was assigned to the 142nd Infantry Regiment as commander of machine gun platoon, and in the same year he was awarded a Silver Medal of Military Valour after being wounded in combat on the Karst Plateau. On 24 November 1915 he was promoted to captain. He later became aide to the commander of the "Lancers of Montebello" Regiment and commander of the 4th squadron, on 15 November 1916 he was admitted to the staff officer course in Padua.

During the early 1920s he served as a staff officer, being promoted to major in 1923 and lieutenant colonel in 1926. In 1928-29 he was assigned to the 1st Regiment "Piemonte Reale". After being assigned to the General Staff, he was promoted to colonel on 16 August 1933 and given command of the Cavalleggeri Guide Regiment in Parma, which he held until 10 November 1935. He was one of the first Italian proponents of the mechanization of cavalry, transforming the Guides regiment into the Fast Tank School. Under his leadership, the Guides Regiment introduced the CV 29 fast tankette, inherited from the aforementioned tank regiment and, after conducting the experiments that would lead to the creation of the Celeri divisions, it formed several fast tank squadron groups, assigned to the three Celeri divisions as well as to the cavalry regiments.

In 1935-1936 Bitossi was in command of the 1st Mixed Regiment of the 102nd Motorised Division Trento, stationed in Cyrenaica. During his stay in Libya, he worked on developing guidelines for the employment and training of Italian tank units. He also authored several articles and studies on armored vehicles, and collaborated in the drafting of the first doctrinal regulations for the use of tank units. In 1936-1937 he was commander of the Central School of Fast Troops in Rome, and from 9 September 1937 he served as deputy commander of the 2nd Cavalry Division Emanuele Filiberto Testa di Ferro, with headquarters in Ferrara. On 31 July 1938 he was promoted to brigadier general, and on 4 November he left for Spain, where he replaced General Annibale Bergonzoli at the command of the Assault Division Littorio of the Corpo Truppe Volontarie, fighting in the Spanish Civil War. On 10 March 1939 he was promoted to major general for war merit and on 30 May 1939 he was wounded in action, after which he was repatriated.

After his return to Italy, he retained command of the Littorio Division, which on the following 28 October was transformed into the third armored division of the Italian Army. After Italy’s entrance into World War II, the division participated in the brief offensive against France and was then stationed in northern Italy until 11 April 1941, when it participated in the invasion of Yugoslavia, occupying Karlovac, Šibenik, Knin, Mostar and Trebinje, for which he was later awarded the Military Order of Savoy.

After the end of the invasion, the Division was transferred to Pordenone, where Bitossi supervised its transformation into an armored division equipped entirely with medium tanks (suitable for use in North Africa), replacing the 33rd Tank Regiment (equipped with L3/35 tankettes) with the 133rd Regiment, consisting of three M13/40 tank battalions. On 22 January 1942 he was sent to Libya with his division, participating in the Axis advance into Egypt and the subsequent fighting near El Alamein (with an interruption between 8 July and 20 September, when he was attached to Delease). After the destruction of his division in the second battle of El Alamein, on 4 November 1942, Bitossi became interim commander of the XX Corps in Tunisia, until his repatriation on 1 March 1943.

In April he wrote Frammenti di una esperienza decennale di guerra motorizzata 1933-1943 ("Fragments of a decennial experience of motorized war 1933-1943"), an important report addressed to crown prince Umberto and Generals Ambrosio, Roatta, Sartoris, Cadorna and Sorice, to report on the conditions in which his division had operated in the North African campaign.

After a long convalescence due to an illness he had contracted for cause of service, on 3 September 1943 he was promoted to lieutenant general and on 5 September he assumed command of the II Corps in Siena, just before the proclamation of the Armistice of Cassibile. On 19 September he was captured by the Germans in Vicenza and interned in Oflag 64/Z in Schokken till May 1945.

In June 1946 he retired from the army, refusing to swear allegiance to the Italian Republic. He died in Rome in 1951.
