= Annibale Bergonzoli =

Italian Lieutenant General (1884–1973)

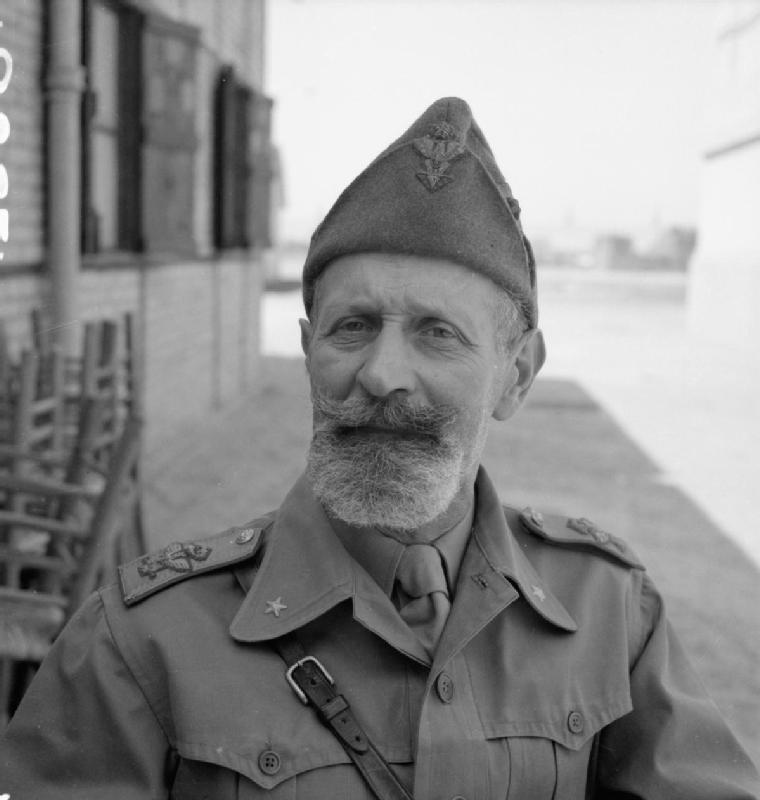
- Bergonzoli in 1941
- Born: 1 November 1884; Cannobio, Kingdom of Italy
- Died: 31 July 1973 (aged 88); Cannobio, Italy
- Military career
- Allegiance: Kingdom of Italy
- Branch: Royal Italian Army
- Service years: 1911–1941
- Rank: Generale di Corpo d'Armata (Corps General)
- Nickname: "barba elettrica" (Electric Beard or Electric Whiskers)
- Commands: XXIII Corps
- Conflicts: Italo-Turkish War; Second Italo-Ethiopian War; World War I; Italian front; Spanish Civil War; World War II; North African campaign; Battle of Bardia; Battle of Beda Fomm (POW)
- Awards: Gold Medal of Valour; Military Order of Savoy

Annibale Bergonzoli (1 November 1884 – 31 July 1973), nicknamed "barba elettrica", "Electric Whiskers", was an Italian lieutenant general who served during World War I, the Spanish Civil War and World War II. In 1940 he commanded the defences of Bardia, Libya. In February 1941, after the disastrous Battle of Beda Fomm, Bergonzoli surrendered to Australian forces. He was held as a prisoner in India and the USA before being repatriated to Italy. Bergonzoli settled in his birthplace, Cannobio, and died there in 1973.

== Biography ==
=== Italian colonial wars ===
He entered the Italian Regio Esercito in 1911, beginning his military career as a second lieutenant. Bergonzoli then took part in the occupation of Libya during the Italo-Turkish War in 1911, continuing to be prominent in Libya for several years, dedicated to mop-up operations against Libyan rebels opposed to Italian colonization.

He also took part in the First World War, a conflict in which he received several decorations for his performance at the front.

In 1935 he participated in the Italian invasion of Ethiopia, which culminated in the annexation of Ethiopia to the Kingdom of Italy, distinguishing especially in the capture of the Ethiopian city of Neghelli.

=== Spanish Civil War ===
Between 1936 and 1939, Bergonzoli was ordered by Benito Mussolini to Spain, forming part of the Corpo Truppe Volontarie, in support of General Francisco Franco and the military rebels during the Spanish Civil War, with Bergonzoli taking charge of the 4th Infantry Division Littorio. After the defeat suffered by the Italian troops at the battle of Guadalajara, he was the only Italian general posted to Spain who was not replaced by Benito Mussolini.

For his performance in the capture of Santander during the northern campaign, he received an Italian decoration, the Gold Medal of Military Valour. Throughout his career, he received two other silver and one bronze medals. He was one of the architects of the so-called Pact of Santoña, by which the Italians accepted the agreed surrender of the Republican People's Army militants affiliated with the Basque Nationalist Party. He also participated in the Aragon Offensive against the troops of the Republican Popular Army.

=== Second World War ===
In 1940 he was the commander-in-chief of the XXIII Italian Army Corps when the invasion of Egypt was attempted.

Bergonzoli was the commander of the Italian garrison in Bardia, which fell on 5 January 1941 following an assault by Commonwealth forces. While most of his men were taken prisoner, Bergonzoli managed to avoid being captured when he escaped through the desert with other soldiers, arriving in Tobruk on 7 January 1941 after crossing some 120 km of desert on foot.

He left Tobruk before the town was captured by Commonwealth forces on 22 January, but on 7 February 1941 Bergonzoli, along with the remnants of the 10th Army, was taken prisoner by troops of the 6th Australian Division in the Battle of Beda Fomm. He was taken first to India and then to the United States as a prisoner of war.

=== Last years ===
He returned to Italy in 1946, settling in Cannobio, his place of birth, until his death on 31 July 1973.

== Career ==
- 1906 – Entered the Royal Italian Army
- 1906 – Student at the Military Academy of Modena
- 1907 – Promoted Sottotenente (2nd Lieutenant), 53rd Infantry Regiment
- 1908 – Student at the Military School of Pavia
- 1909 – Promoted Tenente (1st Lieutenant)
- Student at the Higher War School
- 1911–1912 – Tenente (1st Lieutenant), fought in the Italo-Turkish War
- 1914–1918 – Fought in World War I
- 1915 – Promoted Capitano (Captain), Staff Officer in the IX Division
- 1917 – Promoted Maggiore (Major), Liaison Officer in the High Command of the Allied Armies in the Middle East
- 1917 – Commanding Officer of the "1st Assault Division" Arditi unit
- 1918 – Promoted Tenente Colonnello (Lieutenant Colonel), Chief of Staff of the XXV Division
- 1920 – Promoted Colonnello (Colonel)
- 1920 – Commanding Officer of the XVII Division
- (Fascists gain control and reform the army)
- 1928 – Commanding Officer of the 78th Regiment "Toscana"
- Commanding Officer of the 6th Regiment "Aosta"
- Commandant, School of Subofficers (and Reserve Officers) at Palermo
- 1935 – Promoted Generale di Brigata (Brigadier General)
- 1935 – Commanding Officer, 2nd Celere (Mot.) Brigade "Emanuele Filiberto Testa di Ferro"
- 1935–1936 – Fought in the Second Italo-Ethiopian War
- 1936–1938 – Fought in the Spanish Civil War
- 1937 – Promoted Generale di Divisione (Major General)
- 1937 – General Officer Commanding, 4th Infantry Division "Littorio"
- 1939 – General Officer Commanding, 133rd Armoured Division "Littorio"
- 1939–1941 – Fought in World War II
- 1940 – Promoted Generale di Corpo d'Armata (Lieutenant General)
- 1940 – General Officer Commanding, XXIII Corps
- 1941 – Became a Prisoner of War at the Battle of Beda Fomm
- 1941–1946 – Prisoner of War
- 1947 – Named Generale di Corpo di Esercito (Lieutenant General) in the (Republican) Italian Army
- 1947 – Retired

== Popular culture ==
In the 1941 film, Love Crazy, starring Myrna Loy and William Powell, Powell's character refers to another character played by Vladimir Sokoloff in the film, as looking like "General Electric Whiskers". This may be a reference to General Bergonzoli in a pun on his nickname and General Electric.

Bergonzoli is referenced in Saul Bellow's debut novel Dangling Man. The reference is a humorous anecdote about Bergzonoli who after his military defeat would allegedly refuse to discuss martial matters instead stating "'Please! I am not a soldier. I am primarily a poet!' Who does not recognize the advantage of the artist, these days?"

Bergonzoli is mentioned in C.S. Forester's wartime short story "An Egg for the Major" (later published in Forester's Gold from Crete, 1971), which describes the Battle of Beda Fomm from the perspective of a British light tank commander in an unnamed unit that historically would be the 7th Hussars
