= Eremo di San Colombano =

Hermitage in Trambileno, Italy

Coordinates: 45°52′41″N 11°03′42″E

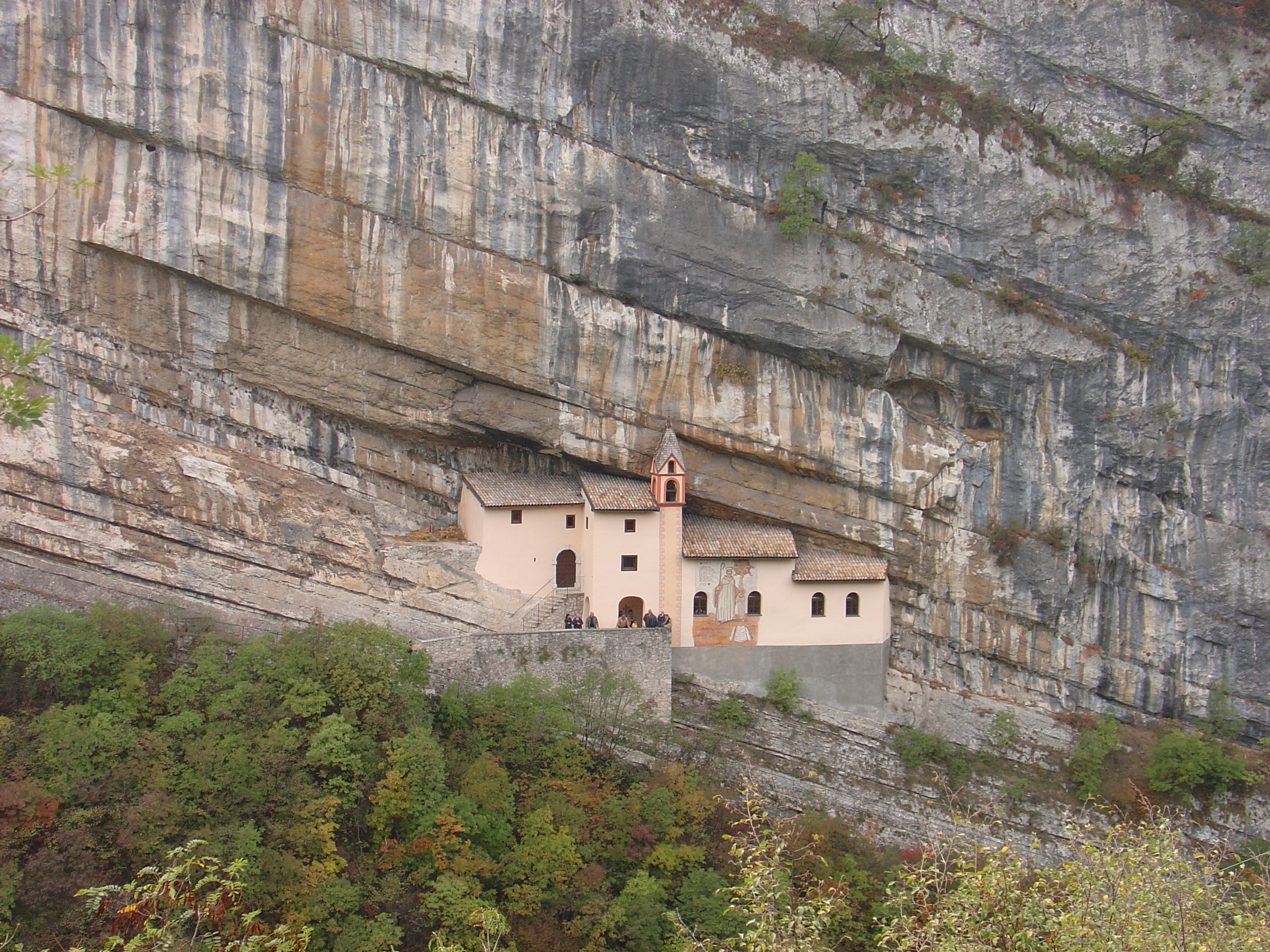
- Eremo di San Colombano

Religion
- Affiliation: Roman Catholic

Location
- Location: Trambileno-Rovereto, Italy
- Interactive map of Eremo di San Colombano

Architecture
- Groundbreaking: 753
- Completed: 1319

Website
- comune.rovereto.tn.it

Eremo di San Colombano is a hermitage in Trambileno, Italy, notable for its location inside a mountain.

Natural caves, halfway up the wall of the gorge formed by the stream of Leno Vallarsa, were used from 753 (date inscribed on the rock) from a Monaco hermit.

== History ==
According to legend, the hermit San Colombano first arrived there and killed the dragon that caused the death of children baptised in the waters of the river below Leno. More likely, the legend came from the first hermit monks at the nearby monastery of Bobbio, or the Priory of St. Columban Bardolino. Visitation to the site was mandatory during Lent.

The first settlement was the "Grotta degli Eremiti," or "Cave of the Hermits." The inscription was dated 753, engraved on the rock next to the current tower, dates to the continued practice of the monastic hermitage.

Between the late tenth and early eleventh century, records indicate the construction of a small church dedicated to the saint at the opening of the cave, under a roof of natural rock. The first documentary evidence of the presence of the hermitage and the church is from 1319, relating to a bequest made to the "Church of St. Columba" on the part of Count William of Castelbarco of the House of Lords of Lizzana and Rovereto, and the other, 1470, is preserved in Lizzana, attesting to the faith of the inhabitants with celebrations and processions to the Irish saint to avert the long drought.

The current church was built in the 18th Century, and completed in 1720. The hermitage is accessed by a staircase of 102 steps carved into the rock. The province of Trent in 1996 restored the church, and opened the site to the public.

The site is maintained by a group of volunteers called the Committee Friends of St. Columban.

Cave frescoes depict a fight between St. Columba and a dragon (an allegory of the struggle between good and evil), as well as the representation of Paradise. Another fresco with "Madonna and Saints" is the fifteenth-century altar of the church and keeps records with prayers and candles dated between 1505 and 1782, witnessed pilgrimages.
