= Felice Chiarle =

Italian soldier during First World War

Felice Chiarle (Peschiera del Garda, October 7, 1871 – Trambileno, 18 May 1916) was an Italian soldier. He participated in the First World War. He died in defense of the Trambileno area in Trentino at the helm of the 17th Alpine Battery Group during the Austro-Hungarian offensive of May 1916, known as Strafexpedition.

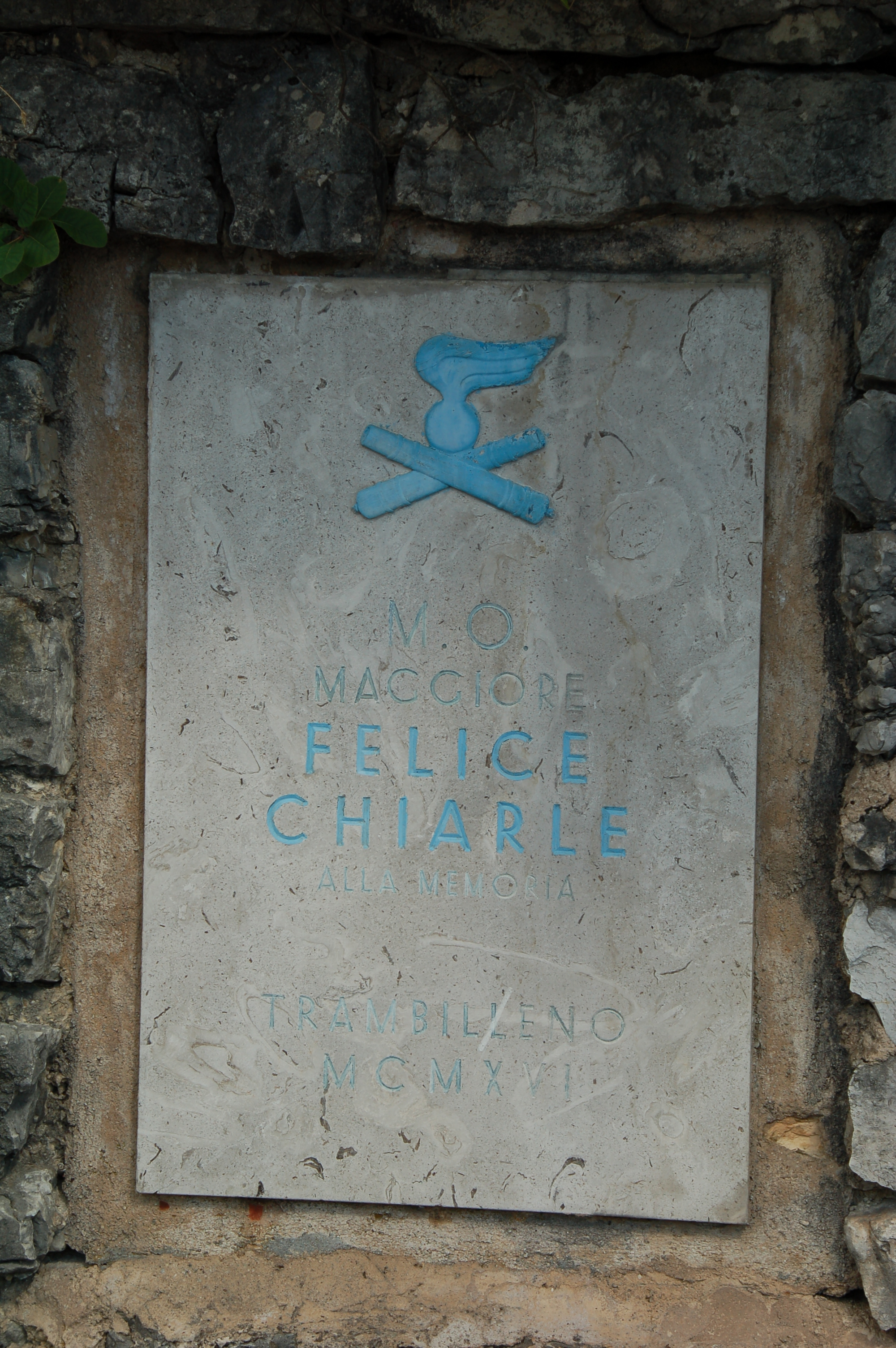
Commemorative plaque along the Strada degli Artiglieri in Rovereto

== Honors ==
Felice Chiarle was awarded on December 3, 1916, the Gold Medal of Military Valor, for the following reasons:

"The commander of a group of mountain artillery supporting the infantry, missing the Captain of one of the most exposed batteries, personally assumed the command he held for four days under intense enemy bombardment and until all the pieces were destroyed. Wounded in the first two days on his shoulder and head refused to leave his men and his position with the survivors, assaulting the bayonet with the Infantry, falling heroically on the field. "

– Trambileno, May 15–18, 1916

The Inclusive Institute (primary and secondary school of first degree) in Peschiera del Garda is also named in his honor.

In his honor are the barracks of Aosta (Alpine Military School in activity), Lodi (Logistico Legnano Btg, now discontinued) and Trieste Guardiella (now school pole).
