= 23rd Infantry Division "Ferrara" =

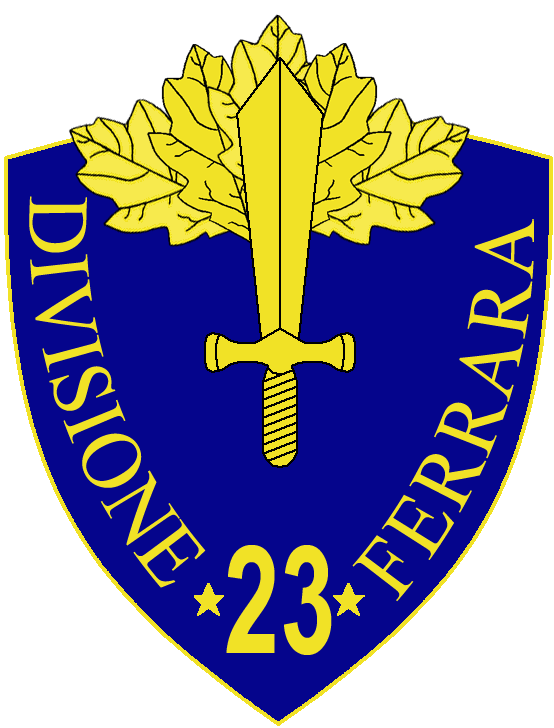
- 23rd Infantry Division "Ferrara" insignia
- Active: 1939–1943
- Country: Kingdom of Italy
- Branch: Royal Italian Army
- Type: Infantry
- Size: Division
- Garrison/HQ: Bari
- Engagements: World War II

Commanders
- Notable commanders: General Licurgo Zannini

Insignia
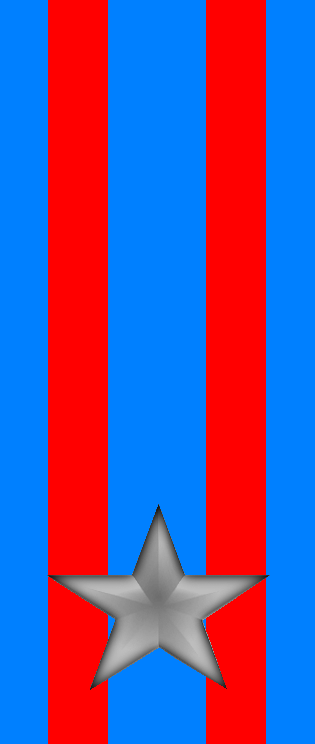
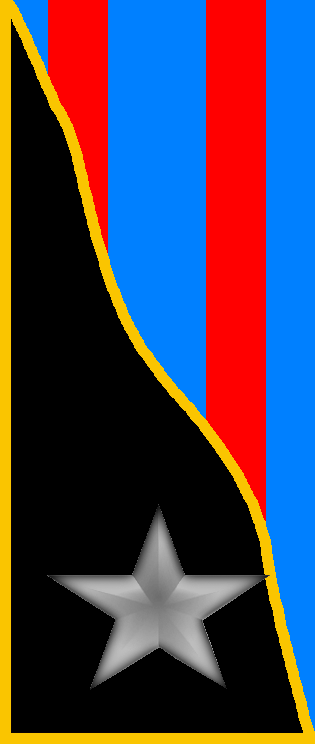
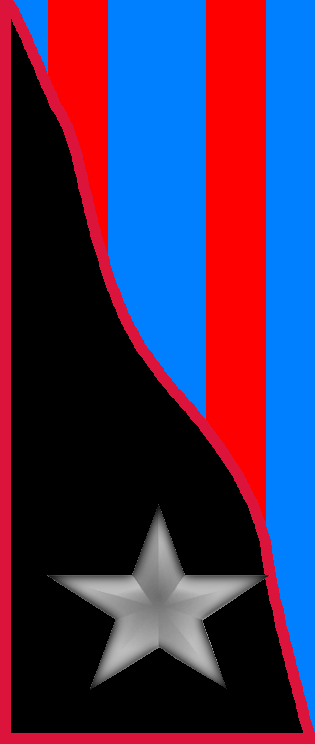
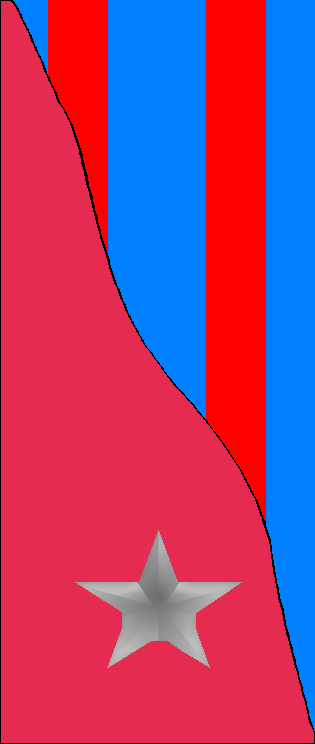
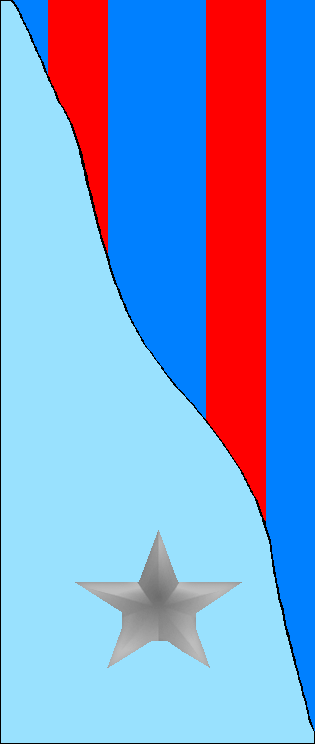
- Identification symbol: Ferrara Division gorget patches

The 23rd Infantry Division "Ferrara" (Italian: 23ª Divisione di fanteria "Ferrara") was a infantry division of the Royal Italian Army during World War II. The Ferrara was a mountain-type infantry division, which meant that the division's artillery and logistics were moved by pack mules, while in standard infantry divisions artillery and logistics were moved by horse-drawn limbers and carriages. Italy's real mountain warfare divisions were the six alpine divisions manned by Alpini troops. The division was named for the city of Ferrara and based in Bari. The division's men were mostly recruited from Bari and in the Altopiano delle Murge region.

== History ==
The division's lineage begins with the Brigade "Ferrara" established on 1 October 1859 with the 25th and 26th infantry regiments of the Army of the United Provinces of Central Italy. On 25 March 1860 the Brigade "Ferrara" entered the Royal Sardinian Army three days after the Kingdom of Sardinia had annexed the United Provinces of Central Italy. Already before entering the Royal Sardinian Army the brigade's two infantry regiments had been renumbered on 30 December 1859 as 47th Infantry Regiment and 48th Infantry Regiment.

=== World War I ===
The brigade fought on the Italian front in World War I. On 30 September 1926 the brigade command and the 48th Infantry Regiment were disbanded, while the 47th Infantry Regiment "Ferrara" was transferred to the XXIII Infantry Brigade. The XXIII Infantry Brigade also included the 9th Infantry Regiment "Regina", which was based on the island of Rhodes, and the 10th Infantry Regiment "Regina" located in Bari. The brigade was the infantry component of the 23rd Territorial Division of Bari, which also included the 14th Artillery Regiment. Since 1924 the 9th Infantry Regiment "Regina" was based in Rhodes in the Italian Islands of the Aegean. The regiment's commander was also the commander of the Royal Army Troops Command Italian Islands of the Aegean (Italian: Comando Truppe Regio Esercito delle Isole Italiane dell'Egeo).

In 1934 the 9th Infantry Regiment "Regina" left the division and was assigned to the newly formed Aegean Military Command, which was responsible for the defense of the Italian Islands of the Aegean. On 1 October 1934 the division raised the 39th Infantry Regiment "Bologna" in Salerno as replacement. The same year the division changed its name to 23rd Infantry Division "Murge".

On 7 April 1937 the 10th Infantry Regiment "Regina" left the division and moved to Rhodes. As replacement the division raised the 48th Infantry Regiment "Ferrara" on 1 July 1937.

=== Invasion of Albania ===
On 28 March 1939 the XXIII Infantry Brigade was dissolved, with the infantry regiments coming under direct command of the division. The division participated in the Italian invasion of Albania as part of the XXVI Army Corps. The division's first troops landed in Durrës on 7 April 1939 and in the next two days moved to Vlorë, Fier, Tepelenë, and the Patos-Marinza and Kuçova oil fields. On 25 April 1939 the division headquarter arrived in Gjirokastër with the division's units taking up residence in Berat, Tepelenë, Këlcyrë and Përmet in southern Albania. The division had left the 39th Infantry Regiment "Bologna" in Italy, which was transferred to the 25th Infantry Division "Bologna" on 27th April 1939. On 24 May 1939 the division changed its name to 23rd Infantry Division "Ferrara", a name change that included the 14th Artillery Regiment. On 15 September 1939 the 47th Infantry Division "Bari" was raised in Bari as replacement for the Ferrara, which was to be based permanently in the Italian protectorate of Albania. Consequently the Ferrara's main depot in mainland Italy was moved from Bari to Foggia.

=== World War II ===
==== Greco-Italian War ====
At the beginning of Greco-Italian War on 28 October 1940, the Ferrara was stretched from Aoös valley to Mal Stugarë mount. It was ordered to advance in the Gjirokastër-Kalpaki-Ioannina direction. On 30 October 1940 the division entered a few hundred meters into a Greek territory near Kakavia and stopped at the Fitóki Potamós stream (a tributary of the Drino). Advancing by road it was able to capture the railroad junction at Kalpaki, but failed to dislodge the town's garrison. Greek resistance, initially weak, grew rapidly, and the Ferrara's advance came to a halt due to enemy resistance and the weather turning the few passable roads and trails into muddy traps. On 1–3 November a battle was fought on the division's right flank for control of the Mesovuni mountain chain, after which the outnumbered Greeks retreated to the Thyamis river. On 5 November 1940 Italian forces fought their way across the Thyamis and into the town of Chrisorrachi a few kilometres to the South of Kalpaki, but were stopped 500 metres from city center on 6 November 1940.

The Greek, reinforced by aviation and artillery, counter-attacked on 6–7 November 1940 and on 10 November the defence of the Ferrara failed in several places. By 14 November parts of the division were nearly surrounded, and the Ferrara started to retreat on 16 November 1940. The division moved back to the Delvinaki-Fitóki Potamós line. Attacks and counter-attacks continued with the increasing odds against Italians, until the entire left flank of the Ferrara was defeated 20 November 1940. At this point, the remnants of division held only a small sliver of Greek territory near Vesania and were ordered to retreat from the increasingly untenable positions in the Pontikates area. On 26 November 1940 these positions were abandoned too and the remnants of the Ferrara were pushed southwards and out of Greece towards the Drino river. The division made a stand at Radat, but suffered a severe defeat there on 27 November 1940, and was relieved from front line duty by the 37th Infantry Division "Modena" on 3 December 1940.

The Ferrara was relocated to Gjirokastër, but soon had to return to the front as rearguard for the defeated Modena division. On 6–7 December 1940 the Ferrara fought a defensive battle south of Tepelenë, at the confluence of the Aoös and Drino rivers. On 14–16 December 1940 the Greeks captured the dominant height of Maja e Buzë Derrit, forcing the Ferrara to undertake costly counter-attacks until the height was re-captured. Until 10 January 1941 the fighting remained dynamic, although no particular gains were recorded on either side. Following a successful skirmish on 10 January 1941 the Greeks renewed their onslaught on 21 January 1941 and until the 58th Infantry Division "Legnano" arrived on 27 January the Italians lost a number of positions. The arrival of Italian reinforcements stabilized the situation and resulted in a gradual reduction of military activities during February 1941.

On 7 March 1941 Greek forces tried to attack at Lekël, but were repulsed. On 16 April 1941, the Ferrara started a general advance near the height of Maja e Buzë Derrit. The division quickly captured positions in the Drino valley, reaching soon the Gjirokastër-Libohovë line where it stayed until August 1941. Afterward it was transferred to Vlorë-Tirana-Elbasan area. In the beginning of January, 1942, the Ferrara division was tasked with coastal defence duty in a sector from ranging from the Seman river to Durrës.

==== Montenegro ====
In April 1942 the division was transferred to Montenegro, with headquarters in Nikšić (later moved to Cetinje), and detachments in Danilovgrad, Podgorica, and Šavnik. Between 14 May and 16 June 1943 the Ferrara participated in Operation Schwarz against Yugoslav partisans. A particularly bloody clash was recorded on 16 May 1943 near Župa, in border region of Bosnia and Herzegovina. After the announcement of the Armistice of Cassibile on 8 September 1943 the Ferrara surrendered to invading German forces and was officially dissolved on 25 September 1943.

== Organization ==
23rd Infantry Division "Ferrara" organization in 1940

- 23rd Infantry Division "Ferrara", in Bari until 1939, afterwards depot in Foggia and headquarter in Gjirokastër, Italian protectorate of Albania
  - Headquarters
    - Command Company
    - 2 × Carabinieri sections
    - 52nd Field Post Office
    - 23rd Infantry Division Command Transport Squad
  - 47th Infantry Regiment "Ferrara", in Lecce until 1939, then Italian protectorate of Albania
    - Command Company
    - 3 × Fusilier battalions
    - Support Weapons Battery (65/17 mod. 13 infantry support guns)
    - Mortar Company (81mm mod. 35 mortars)
  - 48th Infantry Regiment "Ferrara", in Bari until 1939, then Italian protectorate of Albania
    - Command Company
    - 3 × Fusilier battalions
    - Support Weapons Battery (65/17 mod. 13 infantry support guns)
    - Mortar Company (81mm mod. 35 mortars)
  - 14th Artillery Regiment "Ferrara", in Bari until 1939, then Italian protectorate of Albania
    - Command Unit
    - I Group (100/17 mod. 16 howitzers)
    - II Group (75/27 mod. 11 field guns; transferred in July 1940 from the 19th Artillery Regiment "Venezia"; disbanded on 5 November 1941)
    - III Group (75/13 mod. 15 mountain guns)
    - IV Group (75/18 mod. 35 howitzers)
    - 1 × Anti-aircraft battery (20/65 mod. 35 anti-aircraft guns)
    - Ammunition and Supply Unit
  - XXIII Mortar Battalion (81mm mod. 35 mortars)
  - 23rd Anti-tank Company (47/32 mod. 35 anti-tank guns; transferred to the 50th Infantry Division "Regina" in 1942)
  - 23rd Telegraph and Radio Operators Company
  - 58th Engineer Company
  - 127th Medical Section
    - 3 × Field hospitals
    - 1 × Surgical unit
  - 9th Supply Section
  - 23rd Autocarrette Section
  - 1 × Transport Section

Attached from the end of 1940 until early 1942:

- 82nd CC.NN. Legion "Benito Mussolini"
  - LXVIII CC.NN. Battalion
  - LXXXII CC.NN. Battalion (remained attached to the division until 25 September 1943)
  - 82nd CC.NN. Machine Gun Company

Attached during the division's stay in Montenegro:

- XIII Guardia alla Frontiera Artillery Group
- CVI Guardia alla Frontiera Machine Gun Battalion

== Military honors ==
For their conduct during the Greco-Italian War the President of Italy awarded on 31 December 1947, respectively on 26 December 1951, to the regiments of the 23rd Infantry Division "Ferrara" Italy's highest military honor, the Gold Medal of Military Valor.

- 47th Infantry Regiment "Ferrara" on 31 December 1947
- 48th Infantry Regiment "Ferrara" on 31 December 1947
- 14th Artillery Regiment "Ferrara" on 26 December 1951

== Commanding officers ==
The division's commanding officers were:

- Generale di Divisione Licurgo Zannini (7 April 1939 - 18 April 1941)
- Generale di Divisione Francesco Zani (19 April 1941 - 8 February 1943)
- Generale di Divisione Carlo Ceriana-Mayneri (9 February 1943 - June 1943)
- Generale di Divisione Antonio Franceschini (June 1943 - 25 September 1943)

== CROWCASS ==
The names of twelve men attached to the division can be found in the Central Registry of War Criminals and Security Suspects (CROWCASS) set up by the Anglo-American Supreme Headquarters Allied Expeditionary Force in 1945. The names can be found at: Central Registry of War Criminals and Security Suspects from the Kingdom of Italy.
