= 4th Infantry Division "Littorio" =

4th Division "Littorio"
- 4ª Divisione fanteria "Littorio"
- Active: 1936 – 1939
- Country: Kingdom of Italy
- Branch: Royal Italian Army
- Type: Motorized infantry
- Size: Division
- Part of: Corpo Truppe Volontarie
- Patron: Lictor
- Engagements: Spanish Civil War: Battle of Guadalajara; Battle of Santander; Aragon Offensive; Catalonia Offensive

The 4th Infantry Division "Littorio" (Lictor) was a regular, fully motorized infantry division of the Royal Italian Army. It was one of four divisions for the Corpo Truppe Volontarie during the Spanish Civil War. On its return to Italy the division was used to form the 133rd Armored Division "Littorio".

== Order of battle March 1, 1937 Battle of Guadalajara ==
4th Division "Littorio" – Bgd. Gen. Annibale Bergonzoli

- 1st Infantry Regiment – Colonel Daniele Pescarolo.
  - 1st Battalion
  - 2nd Battalion
  - 3rd Battalion
  - Support Battery (65/17)
  - Engineer Section
- 2nd Infantry Regiment “Osa l’Inosabile” – Coronel Ugo Sprega.
  - 1st Battalion – Lt. Colonel Agostino Camurati
  - 2nd Battalion – Lt. Colonel Virginio Manari
  - 3rd Battalion – Lt. Colonel Angelo Sulas
  - Support Battery (65/17)
  - Engineer Section
- Division Machinegun Battalion – Major Antonio Luciano
- 3rd Artillery Regiment – Colonel Giuseppe D'Amico
  - Artillery Group (100/17)
  - Artillery Group (100/17)
  - Anti-Aircraft Battery 20mm
- Carabinieri Section
- Intendencia Section
- Sanitation Section
- Division Truck Unit

== Order of battle August 1937 ==
- Division "Littorio" during the Battle of Santander

Assault Division "Littorio" – Annibale Bergonzoli

- 1st Infantry Regiment
  - 1st Battalion
  - 2nd Battalion
  - 3rd Battalion
- 2nd Infantry Regiment
  - 1st Battalion
  - 2nd Battalion
  - 3rd Battalion
- 3rd Artillery Regiment
  - I Group 65/17
  - II Group 65/17
  - Group (100/17)
  - Group (100/17)
  - AA Battery 20mm
- "Carabinieri" Section
- Intendencia Section
- Sanitation Section

== Order of battle March 1938 ==
- Division "Littorio" during the Aragon Offensive.

Division "Littorio" – Annibale Bergonzoli

- 1st Infantry Regiment
  - 1st Battalion
  - 2nd Battalion
  - 3rd Battalion
  - Battery 65/17
- 2nd Infantry Regiment
  - 1st Battalion
  - 2nd Battalion
  - 3rd Battalion
  - Battery 65/17
- 3rd Regiment of Blackshirts
  - Battalion "Folgore"
  - Battalion "Carroccio"
  - Battalion "Temerario"
  - Battery 65/17
- Assault Battalion
- Artillery Regiment
  - I Group 75/27
  - IV Group 75/27
  - Group 100/17
  - Group 20mm AA
  - Group 37mm AT
- "Carabinieri" Section
- Intendencia Section
- Sanitation Section
- Engineer Section
- Division Truck Unit

== Order of battle November 1938 ==
- Order of battle before the start of the Catalonia Offensive.

Division Littorio – Gervasio Bitossi

- 1st Infantry Regiment
  - 1st Battalion
  - 2nd Battalion
  - 3rd Battalion
  - Support Battalion
  - Battery 65/17
- 2nd Blackshirt Regiment
  - Battalion "Ardente"
  - Battalion "Inflessibile"
  - Battalion "Lupi"
  - Battalion "Vampa"
  - Battery 65/17
- Mortar Battalion
  - 1st Company 81mm
  - 2nd Company 81mm
  - 3rd Company 81mm
- Antitank Company 47/35
- Artillery Regiment
  - Group 65/17
  - Group 75/27
  - Group 100/17
  - AA Battery 20mm
- Engineer Company
- Radio Company

== Sources ==
- de Mesa, José Luis, El regreso de las legiones: (la ayuda militar italiana à la España nacional, 1936–1939), García Hispán, Granada:España, 1994 ISBN 84-87690-33-5
