= Carlo Ceriana-Mayneri =

Italian World War II general

- Born: 8 March 1886; Turin, Kingdom of Italy
- Died: 6 April 1960 (aged 74); Rome, Italy
- Military career
- Allegiance: Kingdom of Italy
- Branch: Royal Italian Army
- Rank: Lieutenant General
- Commands: 4th Regiment "Genova Cavalleria"; Cavalry Application School; Motorized Troops Group; 2nd Cavalry Division "Emanuele Filiberto Testa di Ferro"; 133rd Armored Division "Littorio"; 23rd Infantry Division "Ferrara"; 216th Coastal Division
- Conflicts: World War I; Battles of the Isonzo; Battle of Vittorio Veneto; Second Italo-Ethiopian War; World War II; Axis invasion of Yugoslavia; North African campaign; Yugoslav Front; Operation Achse

Count Carlo Ceriana-Mayneri (8 March 1886 – 16 April 1960) was an Italian general during World War II.

== Biography ==
After attending the Cavalry School of the Royal Italian Army, he graduated with the rank of second lieutenant on 7 April 1905 and was assigned to the 1st Regiment "Nizza Cavalleria", which during the First World War fought near Monfalcone and later in the battle of Vittorio Veneto. Before the war he married Marcella Grazioli Lante della Rovere, with whom he had four children, Giulianella (born in 1914), Vittoria (1915), Ludovico (1920) and Umberto (1931). In 1934, with the rank of colonel, Ceriana-Mayneri was given command of the 4th Regiment "Genova Cavalleria", which in 1935 took part in the Second Italo-Ethiopian War, participating in the conquest of Neghelli. In 1938, after promotion to brigadier general, Ceriana-Mayneri assumed the position of Commander of the Cavalry Application School.

At the outbreak of the Second World War, after promotion to major general in 1940, he took command of the Raggruppamento Celere (Motorized Troops Group) of the First Army, a reserve unit composed of a cavalry regiment, one of tanks and one of bersaglieri, stationed in Fossano. The Raggruppamento Celere did not participate in the Battle of the Western Alps, and after the surrender of France it was moved to Italy’s eastern border. In February 1941 Ceriana-Mayneri was given command of the 2nd Cavalry Division "Emanuele Filiberto Testa di Ferro", which he led during the invasion of Yugoslavia two months later. On 25 July 1942 he was given command of the 133rd Armored Division "Littorio", participating in the North African campaign until the following 17 September.

From February to June 1943 he commanded the 23rd Infantry Division "Ferrara", initially stationed in Durrës used for coastal defense and then later transferred to Montenegro to fight the partisans. There Ceriana-Mayneri organized territorial garrisons to quell popular uprisings, which were violently repressed; during anti-partisan operations in the districts of Nikšić and Šavnik the "Ferrara" Division looted and partially or totally destroyed all settlements in the area, shooting a large number of civilians. Ceriana-Mayneri had urged his troops not to have pity for anyone, because the inhabitants of the area were guilty of having helped and protected the partisans; after the war he was indicted for war crimes but never prosecuted.

In the summer of 1943 Ceriana-Mayneri returned to Italy to take command of the 216th Coastal Division, tasked with coastal defense in the Pisa area. On 12 September 1943, following the proclamation of the armistice of Cassibile, he was captured by the Germans who interned him first in Coltano and later at the San Gallo hospital in Florence, from which he managed to escape and go into hiding. He later managed to reach Allied-controlled southern Italy and to report to the Ministry of War on 27 July 1944. After the end of the war he was promoted to lieutenant general and became president of the Associazione Nazionale Arma di Cavalleria (National Cavalry Association) from 1948 until 1955, when he retired from all public activities. In 1947 he published the book Parla un comandante di truppe. He died in 1960.
