= 216th Coastal Division =

Royal Italian Army infantry division during World War II

- Active: 1943 – 1943
- Country: Kingdom of Italy
- Branch: Royal Italian Army
- Size: Division
- Garrison/HQ: Pisa
- Engagements: World War II

The 216th Coastal Division (Italian: 216ª Divisione Costiera) was an infantry division of the Royal Italian Army during World War II. Royal Italian Army coastal divisions were second line divisions formed with reservists and equipped with second rate materiel. They were often commanded by officers called out of retirement.

== History ==
The division was activated on 10 August 1943 in Pisa by expanding the XV Coastal Brigade. The division was assigned to II Army Corps and had its headquarter in Pisa. The division was responsible for the coastal defense of the coast of northern Tuscany from the mouth of the river Parmignola to Cap San Vincenzo in San Vincenzo.

After the announcement of the Armistice of Cassibile on 8 September 1943 the division, which was still in the process of forming, was disbanded by invading German forces.

== Organization ==
- 216th Coastal Division, in Pisa
  - 12th Coastal Regiment
    - 2 × Coastal battalions
  - 13th Coastal Regiment
    - 3 × Coastal battalions
  - 3rd Coastal Artillery Regiment
    - VII Coastal Artillery Group
    - VIII Coastal Artillery Group
    - XV Coastal Artillery Group
  - 522nd Machine Gun Company
  - 523rd Machine Gun Company
  - 602nd Machine Gun Company
  - 198th Anti-paratroopers Unit
  - 202nd Anti-paratroopers Unit
  - 204th Anti-paratroopers Unit
  - III Platoon, 4th Special Engineers Company
  - 216th Carabinieri Section
  - Field Post Office
  - Division Services

== Commanding officers ==
The division's commanding officers were:

- Generale di Brigata Carlo Ceriana-Mayneri (10 August 1943 - 9 September 1943

== Bibliography ==
- Paoletti, Ciro (2008). A Military History of Italy. Greenwood Publishing Group. ISBN 978-0-275-98505-9.
- Jowett, Philip S. (2000). The Italian Army 1940-45 (1): Europe 1940-1943. Osprey, Oxford - New York. ISBN 978-1-85532-864-8.
