= Francesco Rismondo =

Italian World War I soldier

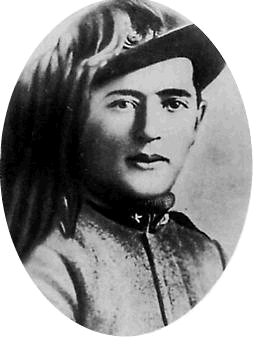
- Born: 15 April 1885 Split, Croatia, Austrian Dalmatia
- Died: 10 August 1915 (aged 30) Gorizia, Italy
- Allegiance: Italy
- Branch: Italian Army
- Conflicts: World War I
- Awards: Silver Medal of Military Valour
- Spouse: Lidia Bugliovazzi

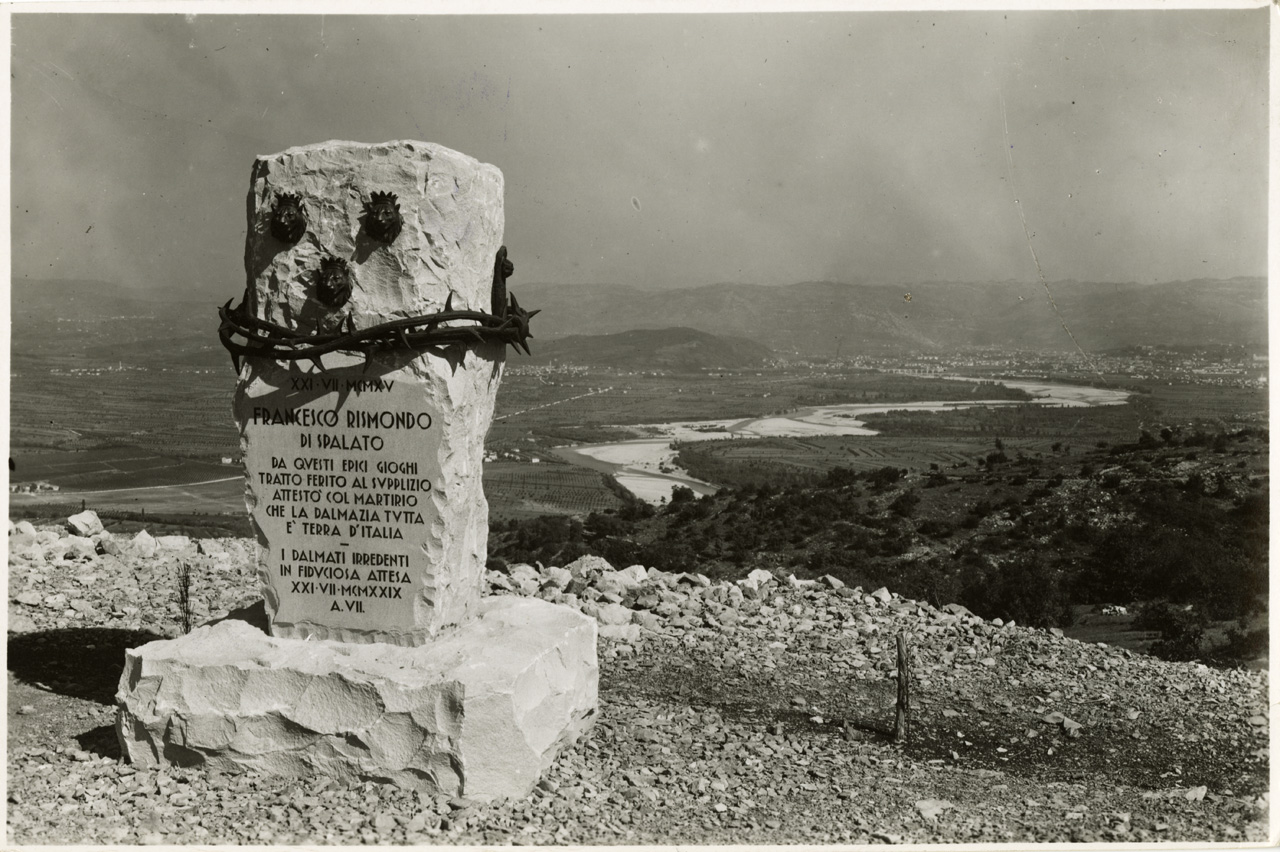
Inscribed cippus for Francesco Rismondo in Monte San Michele

Francesco Rismondo (15 April 1885 – 10 August 1915) was an Austrian-born Italian irredentist and decorated military volunteer.

Rismondo was born in Split, then Austria-Hungary, in a Dalmatian Italian family: his father was a ship-owner. He founded and organized the bicycling and gymnastics societies of the city. Beside their essential purpose, these societies also had a patriotic function. He was a fervid irredentist, and devoted himself to patriotic sportive associations in his hometown, which were striving to preserve Italianness in Dalmatia. After his business studies at the University of Graz, he practiced in UK and became manager in the agency of the Società di navigazione Dalmazia (Dalmatian Navigation Company), owned by his father.

In April 1915 he came to Trieste with his Triestine wife Lidia Bugliovazzi, and on May 19 he crossed the border into the Kingdom of Italy. Immediately after Italy declared war on Austria-Hungary, he enlisted as a voluntary in the 8° battaglione bersaglieri ciclisti ("8th cyclist battalion of the VIII Bersaglieri"). Rismondo refuted to be employed as an interpreter at the headquarters, and instead asked to be sent to the front line. He was sent to the Karst front, where he distinguished himself on Monte San Michele on 21 July. In the night between 20 and 21 July, the bersaglieri of his unit were sent to take over the colleagues of the 11th, who had conquered the peak of the San Michele that afternoon. In the morning of the next day there was a violent counterattack. Rismondo fought valiantly, but was wounded and taken prisoner.

The circumstances of his death are still unclear. Initially, a news that he was recognized and hanged spread. Indeed, an Austrian report does mention the fact that he was executed. According to researches made by the newspaper Il Piccolo, he was taken as prisoner to a concentration camp in Opatje Selo, and was thence sent to repair the Jamiano-Mocorin street. On 20 August, according to this version, he led a revolt and was executed by the Austrian guards together with other six.

Because of his conduct on the Monte San Michele, he was awarded the Silver Medal of Military Valor. A bust in his memory was erected in Rome (1919); a tombstone in Zadar (1923), while an inscribed cippus for him was erected on the San Michele in 1929.
