= Terragnolo =

- Comune
- Comune di Terragnolo
- Location within Italy Location within Trentino-Alto Adige/Südtirol
- Coordinates: 45°53′N 11°9′E
- Country: Italy
- Region: Trentino-Alto Adige/Südtirol
- Province: Trentino (TN)

Government
  - Mayor: Massimo Zenatti

Area
  - Total: 39.4 km^{2} (15.2 sq mi)
- Elevation: 785 m (2,575 ft)

Population (30.04.2020)
  - Total: 692
  - Density: 17.6/km^{2} (45.5/sq mi)
- Demonym: Terragnoli
- Time zone: UTC+1 (CET)
  - Summer (DST): UTC+2 (CEST)
- Postal code: 38060
- Dialing code: 0464
- Website: Official website

Terragnolo (Cimbrian: Leimtal) is a comune (municipality) in Trentino in the northern Italian region Trentino-Alto Adige/Südtirol, located about 20 kilometres (12 mi) south of Trento.

Terragnolo borders the following municipalities: Folgaria, Rovereto, Trambileno, Laghi and Posina.
