= Trambileno =

- Comune
- Comune di Trambileno
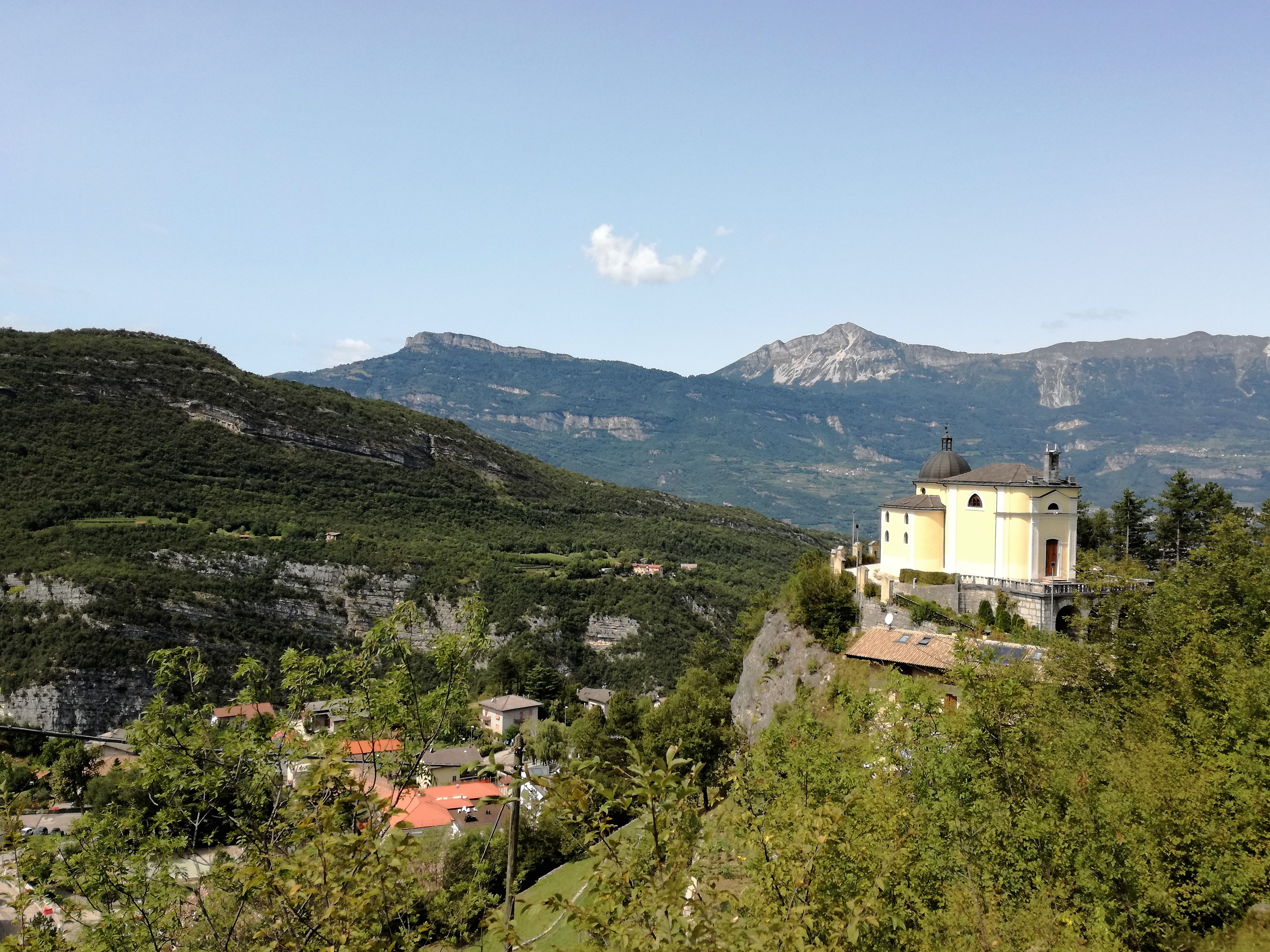

- Location within Italy Location within Trentino-Alto Adige/Südtirol
- Coordinates: 45°52′N 11°4′E
- Country: Italy
- Region: Trentino-Alto Adige/Südtirol
- Province: Trentino (TN)
- Frazioni: Acheni, Boccaldo, Ca' Bianca, Clocchi, Dosso, Giazzera, Lesi, Moscheri (sede comunale), Porte, Pozza, Pozzacchio, Rocchi, San Colombano, Sega, Spino, Toldo, Vanza, Vignala

Government
  - Mayor: Maurizio Patoner

Area
  - Total: 50.7 km^{2} (19.6 sq mi)
- Elevation: 525 m (1,722 ft)

Population (31 December 2015)
  - Total: 1,452
  - Density: 28.6/km^{2} (74.2/sq mi)
- Demonym: Trambeleri
- Time zone: UTC+1 (CET)
  - Summer (DST): UTC+2 (CEST)
- Postal code: 38068
- Dialing code: 0464
- Website: Official website

Trambileno (Trambelém in local dialect) is a comune (municipality) in Trentino in the northern Italian region Trentino-Alto Adige/Südtirol, located about 25 kilometres (16 mi) south of Trento.

Trambileno borders the following municipalities: Rovereto, Terragnolo, Vallarsa, Posina and Valli del Pasubio.

It is known as the location of the Eremo di San Colombano monastery, a church set on a rock ledge.

== Twin towns ==
- Bento Gonçalves, Brazil, since 2007
