= Posina =

- Comune
- Comune di Posina
- Location within Italy Location within Veneto
- Coordinates: 45°47′N 11°16′E
- Country: Italy
- Region: Veneto
- Province: Vicenza (VI)
- Frazioni: Beber, Forni Alti, Fusine

Area
  - Total: 43 km^{2} (17 sq mi)

Population (2018-01-01)
  - Total: 726
  - Density: 17/km^{2} (44/sq mi)
- Time zone: UTC+1 (CET)
  - Summer (DST): UTC+2 (CEST)
- Postal code: 36010
- Dialing code: 0445
- ISTAT code: 024080
- Website: Official website

Posina is a town in the province of Vicenza, Veneto, Italy. It is northeast of SS46. As of 2007 Posina had an estimated population of 657. Posina lies at an elevation of 600 metres (2,000 ft) at the foot of Mount Majo and Mount Gamonda, Mount Pasubio. On the whole dominates the Pasubio which can be accessed through the picturesque Val Caprara, Val Sorapache or arrived at passo Xomo on the Strada degli Scarubbi or the famous Strada delle 52 gallerie great work of military engineering the First World War.

The most important historical building in the town is the Church of Saint Margaret, consecrated in 1764 and restored in 2008. Posina is also home to the EcoMuseo Grande Guerra which remembers the battles of the First World War that had a profound effect on Posina and the surrounding area.

== Points of interest ==
- Strada delle 52 gallerie

== Sources ==
- (Google Maps)
