= Model 20 =

Model 20 may refer to:

== Electronics, computing, telecommunications, office machinery ==
- Compaq Model 20, a luggable transportable computer; see Compaq Portable series
- DEC MicroVAX 3100 Model 20, a backoffice minicomputer; see List of VAX computers
- IBM System/360 Model 20, a mainframe computer
- IBM Model 20, a xerography machine, a photocopier; see IBM copier family
- IBM Model 20, an impact printer; see IBM hammer printers
- Teletype Model 20, a teletype machine from Teletype Corporation
- UNIVAC Model 20, a mainframe computer from UNIVAC

== Transport and vehicular ==
- Edwards Rail Car Company Model 20, a U.S. self-propelled rail car

=== Automotive ===
- AJS Model 20, a UK motorcycle
- AMC Model 20, an automotive axle
- Bour-Davis Model 20, a U.S. automobile from Bour-Davis
- Flanders Model "20", a U.S. automobile
- Harley-Davidson Model 20, a U.S. motorcycle; see List of motorcycles of the 1920s
- Haynes Model 20, a U.S. automobile from Haynes Automobile Company
- Hudson Model 20, a U.S. automobile from Hudson Motor Car Company
- Hupmobile Model 20, a U.S. 1920 model year automobile
- Massey-Harris Model 20, a Canadian 2-plow tractor
- Norton Model 20, a UK motorcycle; see List of Norton motorcycles
- Oldsmobile Model 20, a U.S. automobile
- Winton Model 20, a U.S. automobile from Winton Motor Carriage Company

=== Aviation ===
- Consolidated Model 20, a light transport monoplane U.S. aeroplane
- Taylorcraft Model 20 "Ranch Wagon", a 4-seater monoplane U.S. aeroplane

== Weaponry ==
- Beretta Model 20, a handgun, predecessor to the Beretta 21A Bobcat
- Daisy Model 20 "Little Daisy", a Masonic ritual water pistol from Daisy Outdoor Products
- Glock Model 20, a U.S.-market 10mm handgun
- J.C. Higgins Model 20, a U.S. pump-action shotgun from J.C. Higgins
- Marlin Model 20, a U.S. slide-action .22-calibre rifle
- Smith & Wesson Model 20, a U.S. revolver handgun
- Winchester Model 20, a U.S. breech-loading .410-bore single-barreled shotgun

== Other uses ==
- Polaroid Model 20 "Swinger", a U.S. instant camera
- Randall Model 20, a skinning knife from Randall Made Knives
- SME Limited Model 20, a UK record player turntable

== See also ==
- M20 (disambiguation)
- M2020
- M1920 (disambiguation)
- Class 20 (disambiguation)
- Type 20 (disambiguation)
- 20 (disambiguation)
