= Class 20 =

Class 20 may refer to:

- British Rail Class 20
- GER Class D81, later LNER Class J20
- JNR Class B20
- JŽ class 20
- NER Class R, later LNER Class D20
- New South Wales Z20 class locomotive
- SNCB Class 20
- South African Class 20 2-10-2
- South African Class 20E
- Soviet locomotive class AA20
- U-20-class submarine

== See also ==
- Model 20 (disambiguation)
- Type 20 (disambiguation)
- 20 (disambiguation)
