= Type 20 =

Type 20 may refer to:

- Belgian State Railways Type 20, steam locomotive
- Bristol Type 20, WW1 monoplane British aeroplane
- Howa Type 20, Japanese 5.56mm rifle
- QBZ-191, Chinese 5.8×42mm rifle
- Junkers Type 20, 2-seater monoplane German aeroplane

== See also ==
- T20 (disambiguation)
- Class 20 (disambiguation)
- Model 20 (disambiguation)
- 20 (disambiguation)
