= M1919 =

Under the old Model-year nomenclature system many different Pieces of equipment had the same Model number.

- M1919 Browning machine gun
- 16"/50 caliber M1919 gun
- M1919 Christie 57mm Gun Medium Tank

== See also ==
- M1918 (disambiguation)
- M1920 (disambiguation)
