= M20 =

M20, M-20, or M.20 may refer to:

== Transportation ==
- M20 (New York City bus), a New York City Bus route in Manhattan
- M-20 (Michigan highway), a state highway in Michigan, United States
- M20 motorway, a road in Kent, United Kingdom
- M20 motorway (Ireland), a road, part of the N20 national primary road
- M20 road (Zambia)
- M20 (Johannesburg), a Metropolitan Route in Johannesburg, South Africa
- M20 (Pretoria), a Metropolitan Route in Pretoria, South Africa
- M20 (Durban), a Metropolitan Route in Durban, South Africa
- M20 (Pietermaritzburg), a Metropolitan Route in Pietermaritzburg, South Africa
- M20 highway (Russia)
- M20 (Istanbul Metro)
- Highway M20 (Ukraine)
- BMW M20, a 1976 automobile engine
- Macchi M.20, an Italian civil trainer aircraft
- Mooney M20, a general aviation aircraft
- Northern Expressway, a motorway in Adelaide, South Australia
- Weiwang M20, a Chinese MPV
- BSA M20, a British motorcycle

== Science and technology ==
- Messier 20 (M20), a nebula also called the Trifid Nebula
- Olivetti M20, an Italian personal computer
- British NVC community M20, a mire biological community in the United Kingdom
- M-20 (computer), a Russian Soviet computer
- Garmin-Asus Nüvifone M20, a smartphone
- Samsung Galaxy M20, a smartphone
- McLaren M20, a racing car

== Firearms and military equipment ==
- M20 Armored Utility Car, a WWII-era American scout car
- M20 recoilless rifle, an American rifle
- M20 Super Bazooka, an American anti-tank rocket launcher
- M20 SLBM, a French nuclear missile
- Miles M.20, a Second World War fighter
- M20 (rocket), a U.S. Army rocket of World War II
- M20, a Chinese copy of the Soviet TT-33 pistol
- M20 ballast tractor, the power source of the M19 tank recovery system
- M20 TBM, a Chinese tactical ballistic missile

== Ships ==
- HSwMS M20 - a Swedish minesweeper
- HMS M20 - a British M15 class monitor

== See also ==
- M2020
- M1920 (disambiguation)
- Model 20 (disambiguation)
