= South African type CL tender =

Type of steam locomotive tender

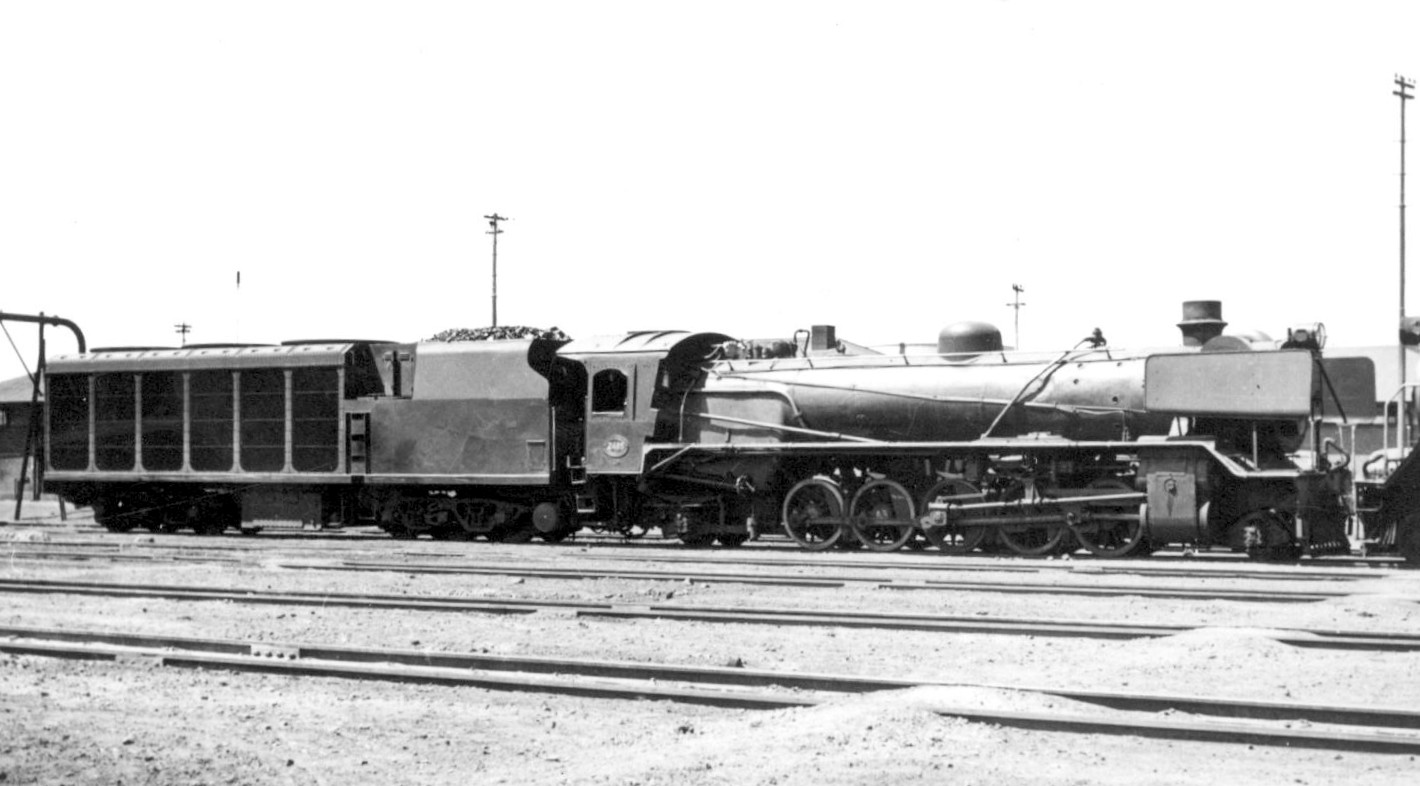
- Type CL condenser tender on Class 20, c. 1950
Type and origin
- Locomotive: Class 20
- Designer: Henschel and Son
- Builder: Henschel and Son
- Works no.: T28388
- In service: 1950
Specifications
- Configuration: 3-axle bogies
- Gauge: 3 ft 6 in (1,067 mm) Cape gauge
- Length: 46 ft 6 7/8 in (14,195 mm)
- Bogies: Buckeye
- Wheel dia.: 34 in (864 mm)
- Wheelbase: 35 ft 5 in (10,795 mm)
  - Bogie: 8 ft 8 in (2,642 mm)
- Axle load: 13 LT 17 cwt 3 qtr (14,110 kg)
  - Front bogie: 41 LT 13 cwt 1 qtr (42,330 kg)
  - Rear bogie: 37 LT 3 cwt 1 qtr (37,760 kg)
- Weight w/o: 78 LT 16 cwt (80,060 kg)
- Fuel type: Coal
- Fuel cap.: 11 LT 10 cwt (11.7 t)
- Water cap.: 3,900 imp gal (17,700 L)
- Stoking: Manual
- Couplers: Drawbar & AAR knuckle
Career
- Operators: South African Railways

The South African type CL tender was a condensing steam locomotive tender.

The single Type CL condensing tender entered service in 1950 as tender to the modified Class 20 2-10-2 Santa Fe type experimental condensing steam locomotive.

== Manufactu ==
The Type CL tender was built by Henschel and Son with works number T28388. In 1950, the South African Railways (SAR) modified its sole Class 20 locomotive to an experimental condensing locomotive equipped with this condensing tender which had been ordered from Henschel in 1948.

== Characteristics ==
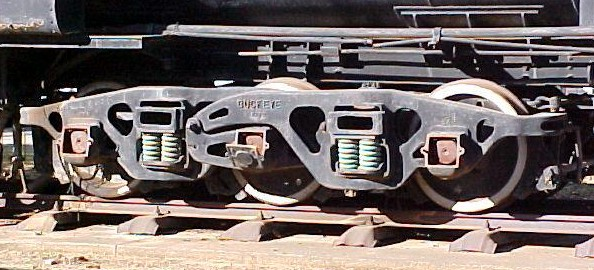
Buckeye bogie

The tender was designed for a Deutsche Reichsbahn Class 52 condensing locomotive. It was modified slightly and was equipped with a pair of Buckeye three-axle bogies instead of the German arrangement of one six-wheeled and one four-wheeled bogie. It had an 11 long tons (11.2 tonnes) coal capacity, a 3,900 imperial gallons (17,700 litres; 4,680 US gallons) water capacity which included the underbelly condensate tank, and a 13 long tons 17 hundredweight 3 quarters (14,110 kilograms) maximum axle load. The tender was capable of condensing 27,000 pounds (12,000 kilograms) of exhaust steam per hour in maximum operating temperatures of between 100 and 110 degrees Fahrenheit (38 and 43 degrees Celsius). The tender had six large radiators on each side, cooled by three exhaust steam-driven roof-mounted fans which drew air from outside through the radiators.

== Locomotive ==
Only the modified Class 20 locomotive ran with the Type CL tender. The tender was designed in such a way that it could also be used on a modified Class 19D or Class 24 locomotive, but such modifications never took place.

During trials, a saving of between 88% and 93% on water as well as a lower coal consumption were attained, the latter brought about by the higher temperature of the feedwater condensate. Depending on the operating conditions, a water range of between 400 and 680 miles (640 and 1,090 kilometres) was achieved. The positive results of the condensing trials led to the introduction of the Class 25 4-8-4 condensing locomotive fleet between 1953 and 1955.

== Classification letters ==
Since many tender types are interchangeable between different locomotive classes and types, a tender classification system was adopted by the SAR. The first letter of the tender type indicates the classes of engines to which it can be coupled. The two "C_" tender types were condensing tenders and could only be used with the specific locomotive class for which each was designed.

- Type CL tender on the Class 20.
- Type CZ tender on the Class 25.

The second letter indicates the tender's water capacity. The "_L" tenders had a capacity of 3,900 imperial gallons (17,700 litres; 4,680 US gallons).

== Illustration ==
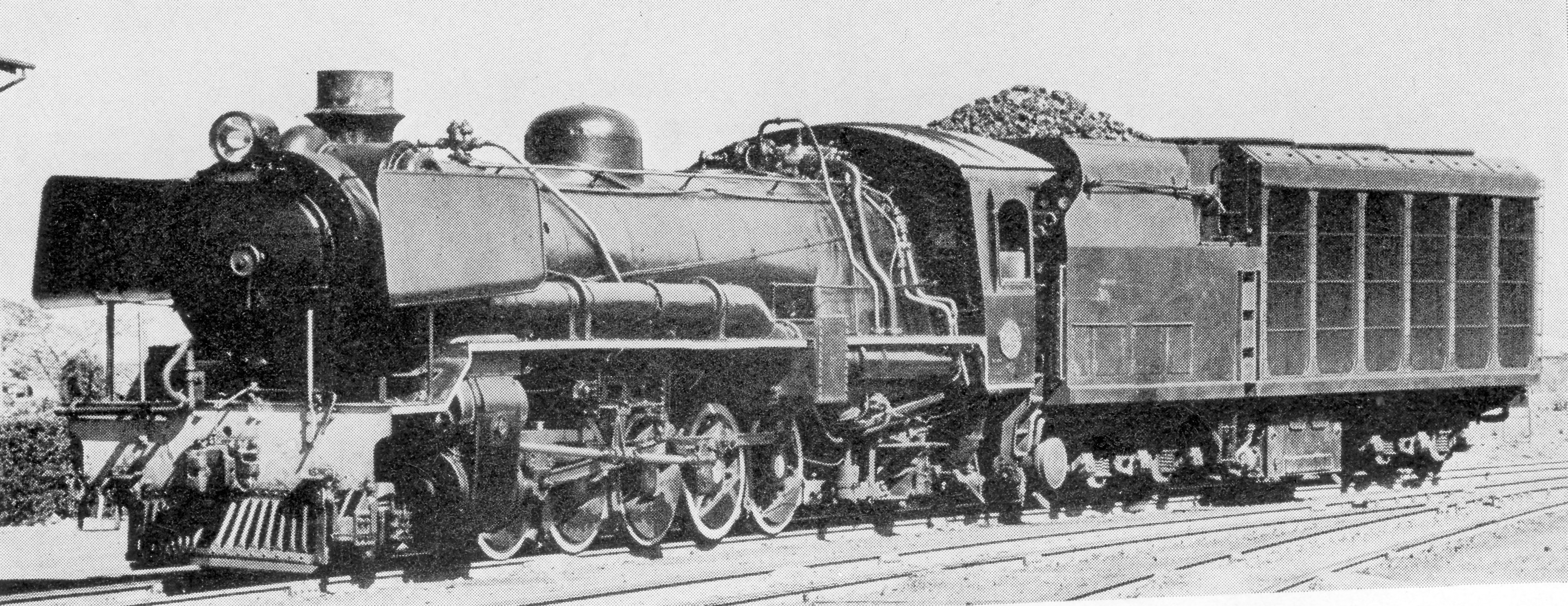
Type CL condenser tender on Class 20, c. 1950
