= T20 (disambiguation) =

T20, or Twenty20, is a form of cricket.

T20 may also refer to:

== Aircraft ==
- AeroVironment T-20, a French UAV
- Slingsby T.20, a British glider

== Automobiles ==
- Chana Shenqi T20, a kei truck
- Cooper T20, a racing car
- Cooper-Bristol T20/25, a sports car based on the Cooper T20
- Jinbei Haixing T20, a pickup truck
- Suzuki T20, a motorcycle
- Toyota Corona (T20), a sedan

== Rail and transit ==
- Prussian T 20, a steam locomotive
- Akaike Station (Aichi), Nisshin, Aichi, Japan
- Higashi-Umeda Station, Umeda, Kita-ku, Osaka, Japan
- Gyōtoku Station, Ichikawa, Chiba, Japan
- Sanuki-Mure Station, Takamatsu, Kagawa, Japan

== Sport ==
- T20 (classification), a disability athletics classification

== Other uses ==
- Enfuvirtide, an HIV drug
- T20 road (Tanzania)
- German torpedo boat T20
- IBM ThinkPad T20 series of notebook computers
- T-20 armored tractor Komsomolets, a Soviet artillery tractor
- T20 Medium Tank, an American tank
- T20 summit, a series of international summit for think tanks from the G-20 countries

== See also ==
- Type 20 (disambiguation)
- 20 (disambiguation)
