= AMC 20 =

Automotive axle produced by American Motors Corporation

The AMC Model 20 is an automotive axle manufactured by American Motors Corporation (AMC) and AM General.

== General specifications ==
The AMC 20 is a carrier-tube axle, which is where the axle tubes press into the housing, and the cover is bolted to the rear. They have an 8 7/8-inch (230 mm) ring gear and use a 29 spline axle shaft. The differential cover is round with twelve bolts, making it one of the easiest axles to identify. Most AMC 30 rear axles use a 3-inch (76 mm) tube, and the gasket shape is round with almost the same height and width (10 1/32 in (255 mm) x 10 25/64 in (264 mm).

The AMC 20 was most often used with V8 engines in cars with rear-wheel-drive. This axle has an extensive history of use in drag racing. It is also found in Jeeps for the rear and was also used in the AM General Humvee.

The AMC 20 rear axle used in Jeep CJ applications with two-piece axle shafts was described as having a weak and flexible housing, while the version used in full-sized Jeeps (Wagoneer, Gladiator, and M-715) is stronger but does not have as much aftermarket support as other brands.

== Ratios ==
There were many ratios offered over the lifetime of the AMC 20. A letter code stamped on a small pad at the right side of the center housing or carrier flange indicates installed gears. AMC changed or reused letter codes during the axle's long life. While the codes can be helpful, the axle ratio could have been changed after the vehicle was produced.

Letter Code Open Differential	Letter Code "Twin Grip"	Ratio:1	Pinion:Ring Gear Teeth
W	-	2.56	16:41
AA	DD	2.73	15:41
C	O	2.87	15:43
X	Y	3.07	14:43
B	P	3.15	13:41
BB	CC	3.31	13:43
A	N	3.54	11:39
D	O	3.91	11:43
L	M	4.10	10:41

Dealer installed gears (3.73, 4.10, 4.44:1, and 5.00) were available There are other gear ratios available in the aftermarket.
