= M1918 =

M1918 may refer to:

- M1918 Browning Automatic Rifle
- Beretta M1918
- M1918 light repair truck
- 3-inch Gun M1918
- Ford 3-Ton M1918 World War I tank
- M1918 240 mm Howitzer
- Mauser 1918 T-Gewehr
- M1918M1 155mm Gun, US-made version of French Canon de 155mm GPF
- M1918 155mm Howitzer, US-made version of French Canon de 155 C modèle 1917 Schneider
- M1918 trench knife
- M1918 Stahlhelm helmet

(Under the old model-year nomenclature system many different pieces of equipment had the same model number.)

== See also ==
- M1917 (disambiguation)
- M1919 (disambiguation)
- List of U.S. military vehicles by supply catalog designation
