= Belgian State Railways Type 20 =

Class of 54 Belgian 0-8-0T locomotives

Type and origin
- Power type: Steam
- Build date: 1870–1874, 1880
- Total produced: 54
Specifications
- Configuration
  - Whyte: 0-8-0T
  - UIC: D n2t
- Gauge: 1,435 mm (4 ft 8 1/2 in)
- Driver dia.: 1,050 mm (3 ft 5 3/8 in)
- Wheelbase: 4.50 m (14 ft 9 1/4 in)
- Length: 10.020 m (32 ft 10 1/2 in)
- Axle load: 13.50 t (29,800 lb)
  - 1st coupled: 12.10 t (26,700 lb)
  - 2nd coupled: 12.65 t (27,900 lb)
  - 3rd coupled: 13.50 t (29,800 lb)
  - 4th coupled: 12.55 t (27,700 lb)
- Loco weight: 50.8 t (112,000 lb)
- Fuel capacity: 1,900 kg (4,190 lb)
- Water cap.: 6,600 L (1,450 imp gal; 1,740 US gal)
- Firebox
  - Type: Belpaire
  - Grate area: 3.78 m^{2} (40.7 sq ft)
- Boiler pressure: 9 atm (0.912 MPa; 132 psi)
- Heating surface: 136.1033 m^{2} (1,465.004 sq ft)
- Cylinders: Two, inside
- Cylinder size: 480 mm × 550 mm (18.90 in × 21.65 in)
- Valve gear: Belpaire–Stévart
Performance figures
- Tractive effort: 9 atm: 7,292 kg (16,076 lb); 10 atm: 8,103 kg (17,864 lb)
Career
- Operators: Belgian State Railways
- Class: Type 20

The Belgian State Railways Type 20 was a class of 0-8-0T steam locomotives, introduced in 1870.

== Construction history ==
The locomotives were built by various manufacturers from 1870–1874. One additional locomotive was delivered by Cockerill in 1880. The machines were designed by Belpaire and Stevart and had a Belpaire–Stévart valve gear.

Production quantities
| Manufacturer | Quantity | Years | Note |
|---|---|---|---|
| Malines | 1 | 1870 | EB No 50, Prototype |
| Cockerill | 34 | 1871–1875 | |
| Cockerill | 1 | 1880 | |
| Couillet | 5 | 1874 | |
| Tubize | 14 | 1873–1874 | |
