= South African Class 25 4-8-4 =

1953 design of condensing steam locomotive

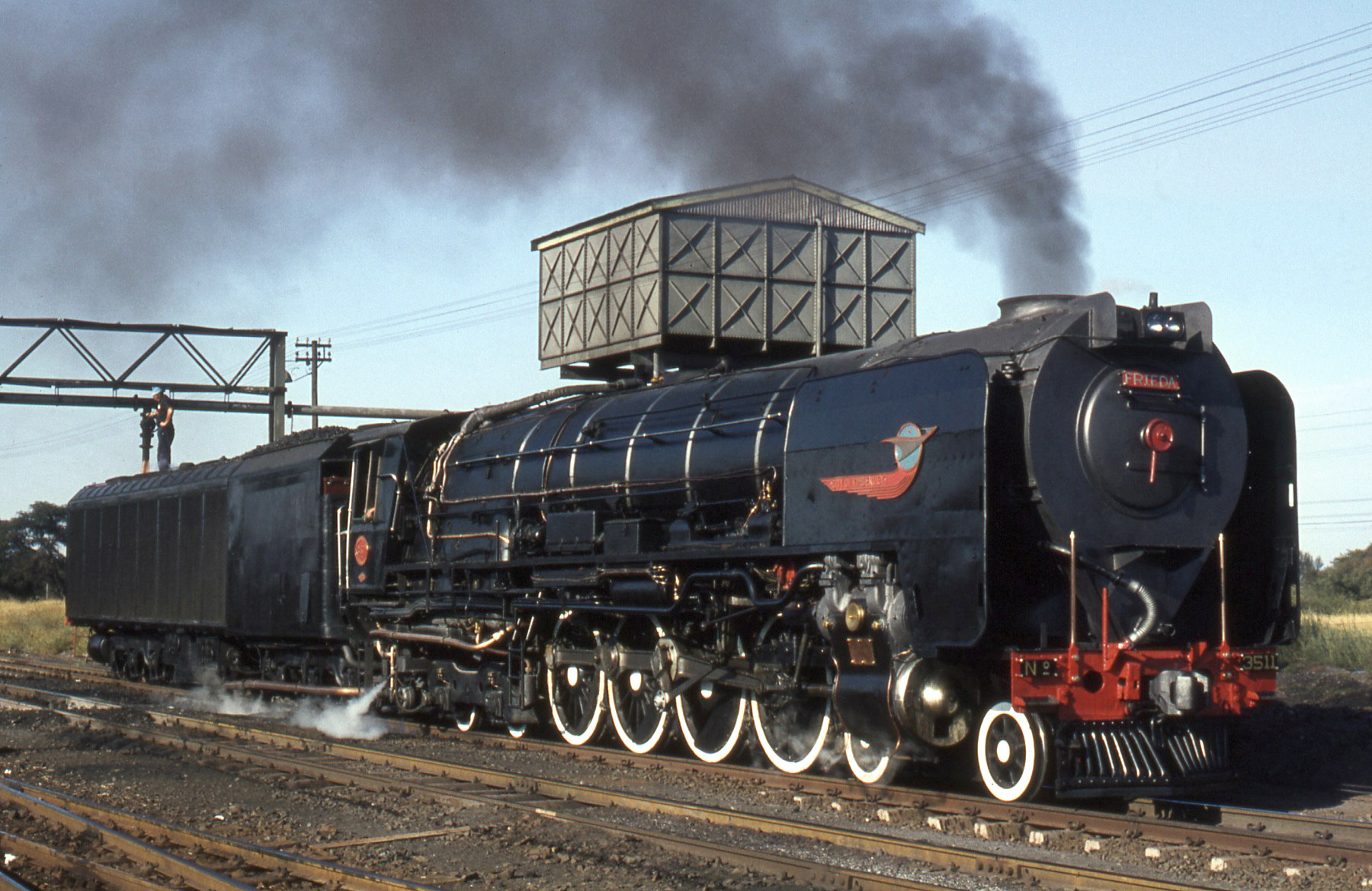
- 3511 at Hartswater, 24 April 1981
Type and origin
- Power type: Steam
- Designer: South African Railways (L.C. Grubb); Henschel & Son
- Builder: Henschel & Son; North British Locomotive Company
- Serial number: Henschel 28730; NBL 27312-27400
- Model: Class 25
- Build date: 1953
- Total produced: 90
- Rebuilder: South African Railways
- Rebuild date: 1973-1980
- Number rebuilt: 87 to Class 25NC
Specifications
- Configuration
  - Whyte: 4-8-4
  - UIC: 2′D2′h2
- Driver: 2nd coupled axle
- Gauge: 3 ft 6 in (1,067 mm) Cape gauge
- Leading dia.: 30 in (762 mm)
- Coupled dia.: 60 in (1,524 mm)
- Trailing dia.: 30 in (762 mm)
- Tender wheels: 34 in (864 mm)
- Minimum curve: 275 ft (84 m)
- Wheelbase: 95 ft 1 11/16 in (28,999 mm)
  - Engine: 38 ft (11,582 mm)
  - Leading: 6 ft 10 in (2,083 mm)
  - Coupled: 15 ft 9 in (4,801 mm)
  - Trailing: 5 ft 6 in (1,676 mm)
  - Tender: 45 ft 10 in (13,970 mm)
  - Tender bogie: 10 ft (3,048 mm)
- Length
  - Over couplers: 107 ft 6 1/16 in (32,768 mm)
- Height: 13 ft (3,962 mm)
- Frame type: Cast
- Axle load: 19 LT 6 cwt (19,610 kg)
  - Leading: 21 LT 1 cwt (21,390 kg)
  - 1st coupled: 19 LT 4 cwt (19,510 kg)
  - 2nd coupled: 19 LT 5 cwt (19,560 kg)
  - 3rd coupled: 19 LT 6 cwt (19,610 kg)
  - 4th coupled: 19 LT 3 cwt (19,460 kg)
  - Trailing: 22 LT 10 cwt (22,860 kg)
  - Tender bogie: Bogie 1: 57 LT 4 cwt (58,120 kg); Bogie 2: 56 LT 14 cwt (57,610 kg)
  - Tender axle: 19 LT 1 cwt 2 qtr (19,380 kg)
- Adhesive weight: 76 LT 18 cwt (78,130 kg)
- Loco weight: 120 LT 9 cwt (122,400 kg)
- Tender weight: 113 LT 18 cwt (115,700 kg)
- Total weight: 234 LT 7 cwt (238,100 kg)
- Tender type: CZ (3-axle bogies)
- Fuel type: Coal
- Fuel capacity: 19 LT (19.3 t)
- Water cap.: 4,400 imp gal (20,000 L) main tank 600 imp gal (2,730 L) condensate
- Firebox
  - Type: Round-top
  - Grate area: 70 sq ft (6.5 m^{2})
- Boiler
  - Type: Domeless
  - Pitch: 9 ft 1 5/8 in (2,784 mm)
  - Diameter: 6 ft 4 1/8 in (1,934 mm)
  - Tube plates: 19 ft (5,791 mm)
  - Small tubes: 158: 2 1/2 in (64 mm)
  - Large tubes: 40: 5 1/2 in (140 mm)
- Boiler pressure: 225 psi (1,551 kPa)
- Safety valve: Ross-pop
- Heating surface
  - Firebox: 294 sq ft (27.3 m^{2})
  - Tubes: 3,059 sq ft (284.2 m^{2})
  - Arch tubes: 37 sq ft (3.4 m^{2})
  - Total surface: 3,390 sq ft (315 m^{2})
- Superheater
  - Type: Melesco
  - Heating area: 630 sq ft (59 m^{2})
- Cylinders: Two
- Cylinder size: 24 in (610 mm) bore 28 in (711 mm) stroke
- Valve gear: Walschaerts
- Valve type: Piston
- Valve travel: 7 3/8 in (187 mm)
- Loco brake: Vacuum
- Couplers: AAR knuckle
Performance figures
- Tractive effort: 45,360 lbf (201.8 kN) @ 75%
Career
- Operators: South African Railways
- Class: Class 25
- Number in class: 90
- Numbers: 3451-3540
- Official name: Frieda (3511)
- Nicknames: Condenser
- Delivered: 1953-1954
- First run: 1953
- Preserved: Three preserved, remainder scrapped

The South African Railways Class 25 4-8-4 of 1953 was a condensing steam locomotive.

Between 1953 and 1955, the South African Railways placed ninety Class 25 condensing steam locomotives with a 4-8-4 Northern type wheel arrangement in service. The Class 25NC which was placed in service at the same time was a non-condensing version of the Class 25 condenser.

== Background ==
Owing to the difficulties experienced to obtain adequate supplies of suitable water in arid regions like the Great Karoo between Touws River and Kimberley and from De Aar into South West Africa (SWA), the South African Railways (SAR) began to give serious consideration to the possibility of introducing condensing locomotives as far back as the late 1930s. At one time it was considered to convert Class 12A 4-8-2 locomotives to condensing engines, but the idea was not put into practice.

Condensing locomotives were a rarity, but no novelty to South Africa, since the first condensing steam locomotives had already entered service in the Cape of Good Hope in the late nineteenth century. Between 1886 and 1888, three well-tank condensing locomotives with a 0-4-0 wheel arrangement were placed in service by the Cape Copper Mining Company on its Namaqualand Railway, a 2 ft 6 in (762 mm) gauge line between Port Nolloth and O'okiep.

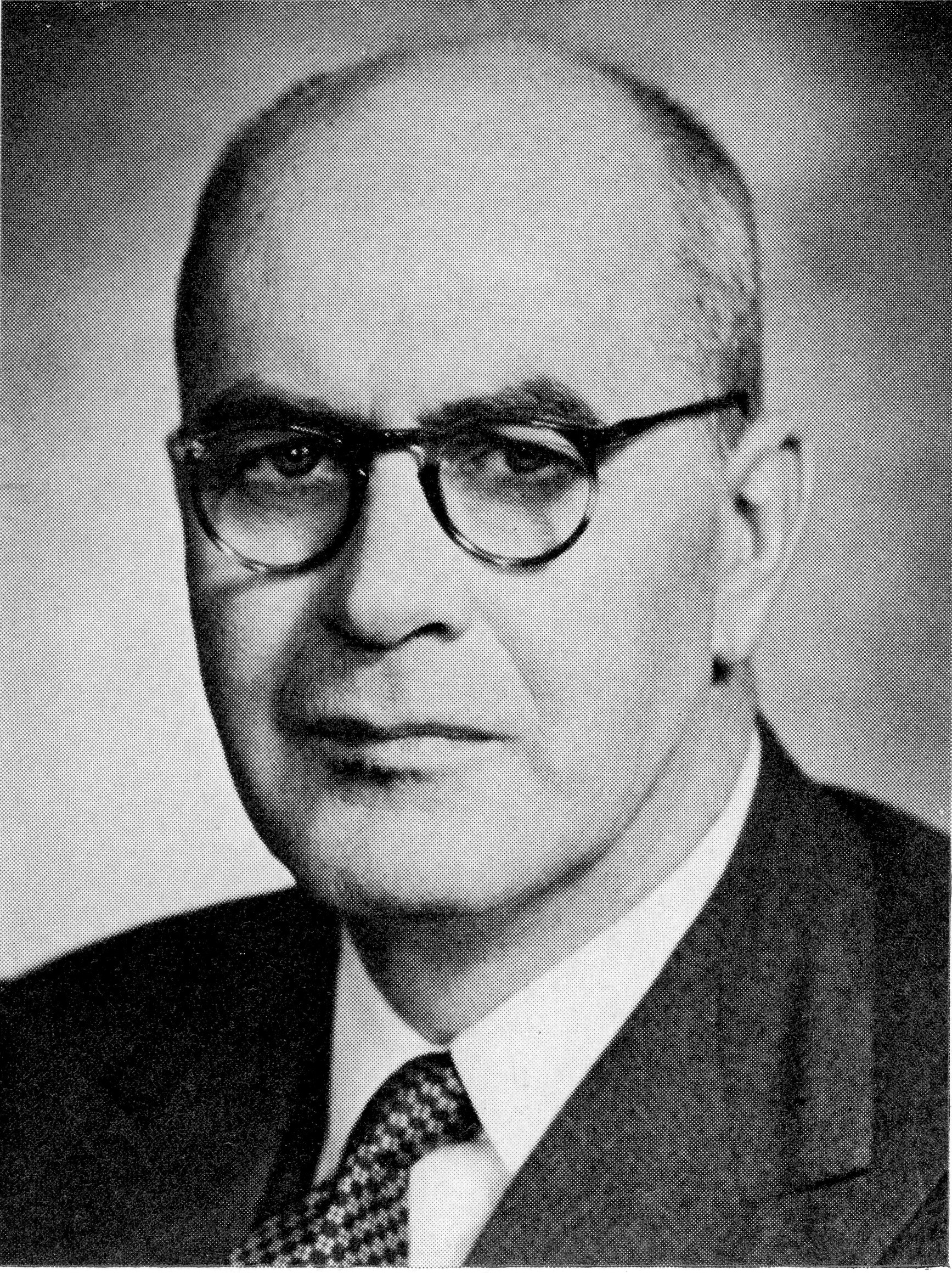
L.C. Grubb

On the SAR, it was only after World War II, that extensive condensing tests were carried out with the modified Class 20 locomotive. The approximately 90% water and 10% coal savings which were achieved during the tests with the Class 20 in the Eastern Transvaal and the Karoo in 1950 and 1951 led to the decision to proceed with the design of a new condensing locomotive.

The result, the Class 25 4-8-4 Northern type condensing locomotive, can be considered as the ultimate in SAR non-articulated steam locomotive design. It was designed under the direction of L.C. Grubb, Chief Mechanical Engineer of the SAR from 1949 to 1954.

== Manufacturers ==
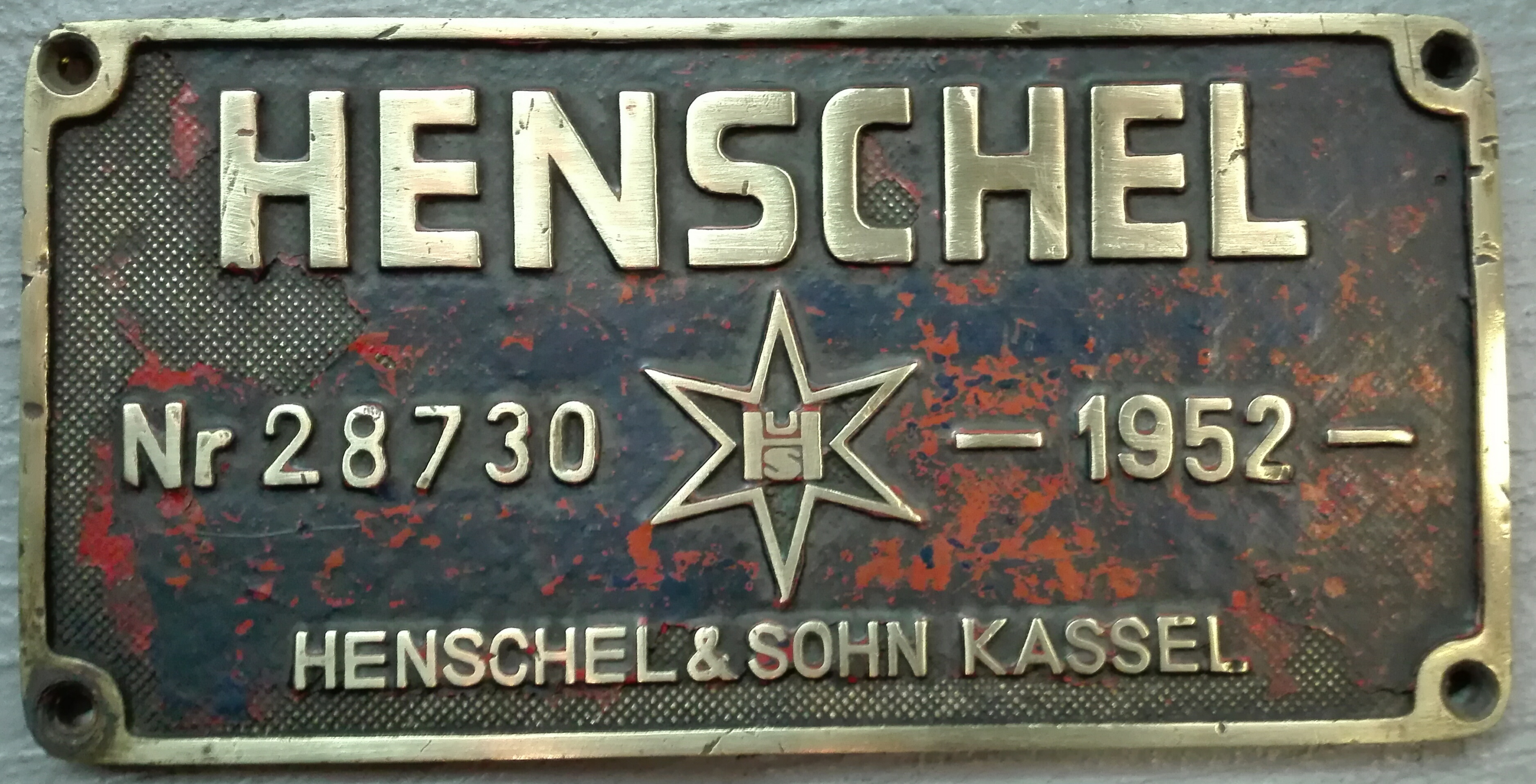
25 3451 Builders Plate

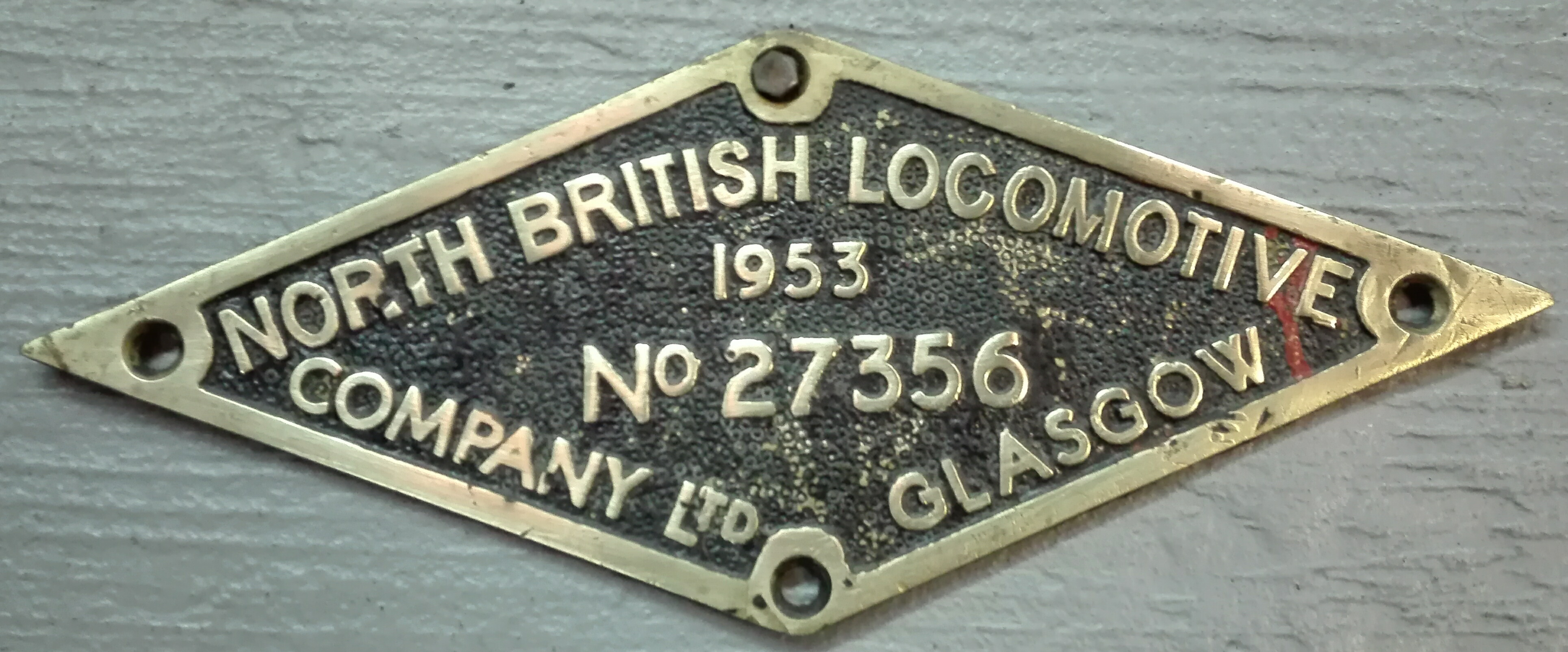
Class 25 3496 Builders Plate

The design work on the locomotive's condensing apparatus and the condensing tender was carried out by Henschel & Son, who built one locomotive complete with tender, Number 3451, with works number 28730. After being tried in Kassel, it was then dispatched to the North British Locomotive Company (NBL) in Glasgow who built the rest of the Class 25 locomotives, numbered in the range from 3452 to 3540. They were delivered between 1953 and 1955.

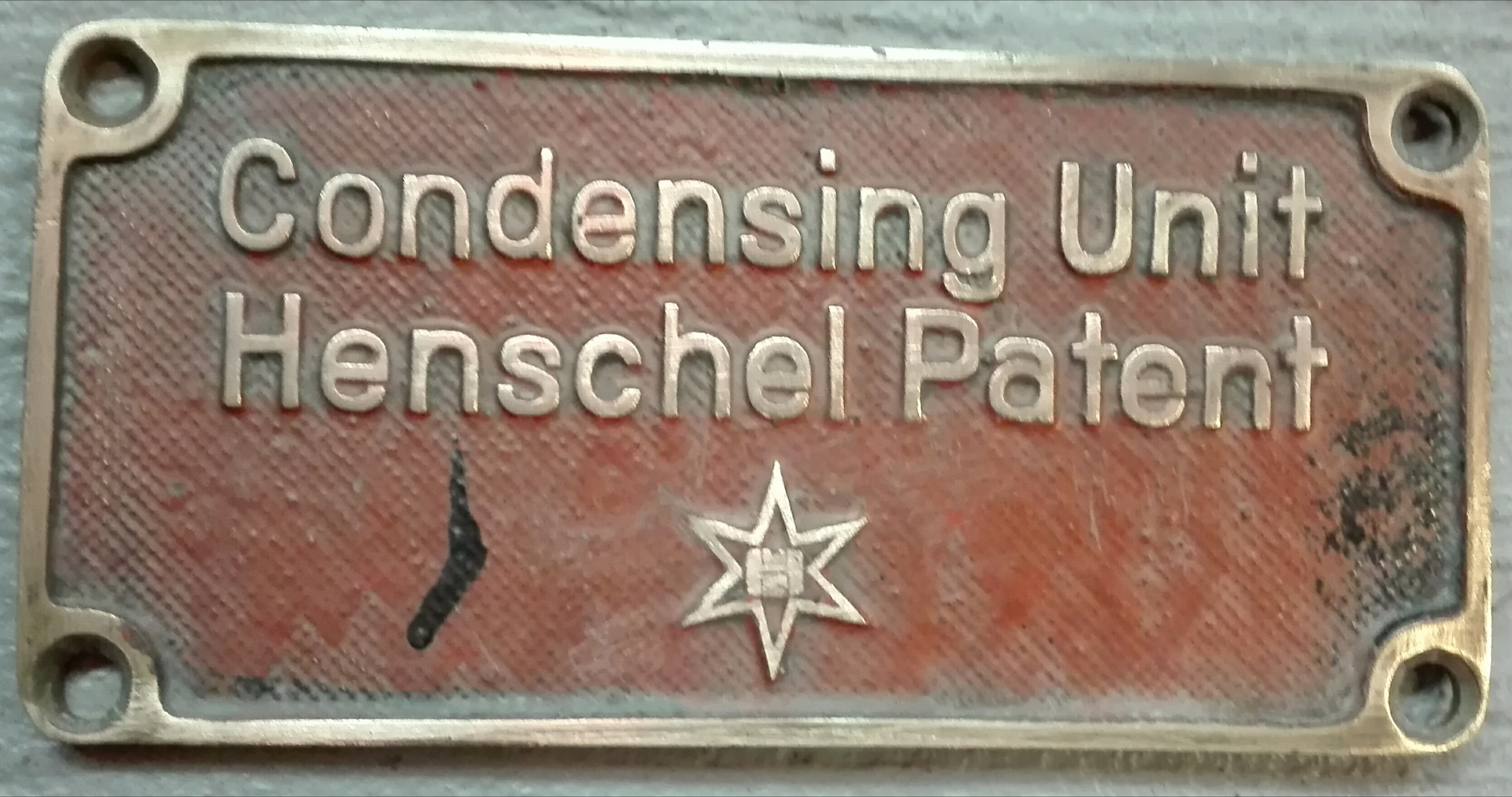
Class 25 3451 Tender Patent

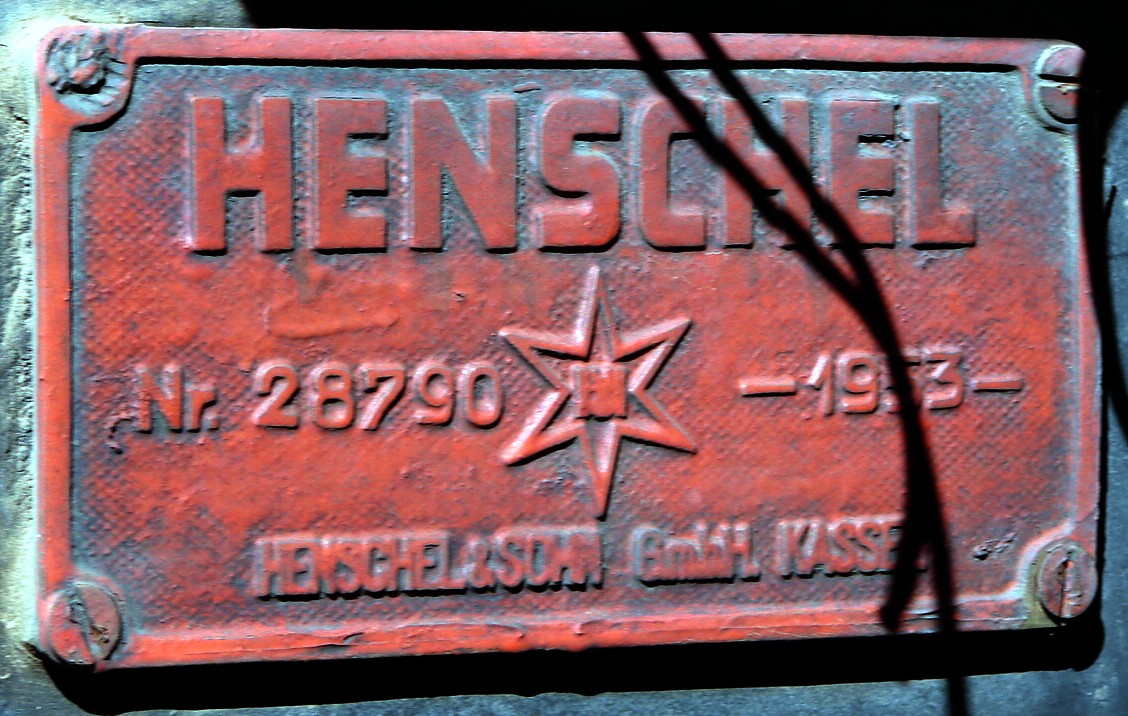
Tender works plate

Apart from the complete engine and tender of Number 3451, Henschel built sixty more of the condensing tenders to which they held the patent, with works numbers in the range from 28780 to 28839, as well as four spare boilers for the Classes 25 and 25NC with works numbers in the range from 28770 to 28773. The last 29 condensing tenders were built by NBL.

In 1963, one more condensing tender, no. 3541, was built by the Salt River shops of the SAR on a spare cast frame which had been delivered as part of the original order which called for three spare frames: one for an engine and one each for a condenser and non-condenser tender.

== Characteristics ==
The boiler was similar to the Watson Standard no. 3B boiler of the Class 15F, but with the distance between tube plates reduced from 22 feet 6 inches (6,858 millimetres) to 19 feet (5,791 millimetres) by the addition of a combustion chamber. While this resulted in a slight decrease in the total evaporative heating surface, there was a 40% increase in the firebox heating surface and a better ratio of firebox to grate area. The boiler was lagged with Cape Asbestos mattresses, manufactured and fitted in South Africa.

On the condensing locomotive, spent steam was recycled and condensed back to water for repeated use. Since the steam wasn't expelled up the chimney, the Class 25's smokebox contained a steam turbine-driven fan beneath the chimney to keep the draft going, with deflector plates that were supposed to prevent char from causing excessive wear on the fan blades.

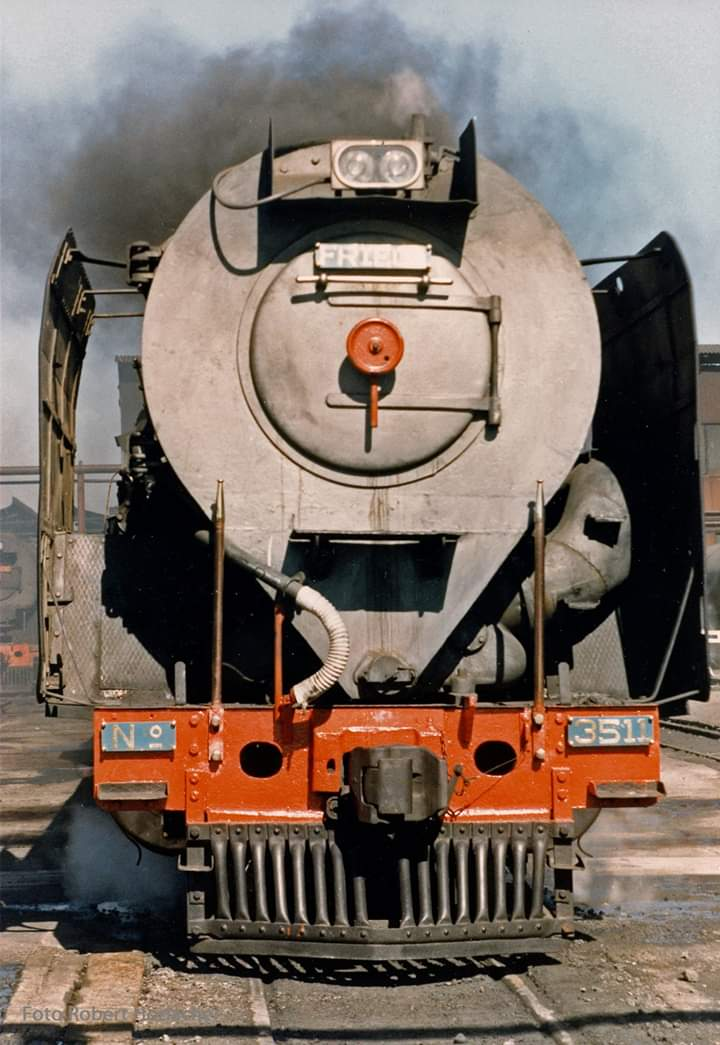
25 3511 smokebox front

The smokebox of the Class 25 was similar to that of the Class 25NC, but with the front extended to accommodate the centrifugal blower which was driven by an exhaust steam turbine mounted under the front of the smokebox. Apart from the usual round smokebox door in the centre of the smokebox front plate, the complete front smokebox plate on both classes was hinged to the wrapper plate on the right hand side of the smokebox in addition to being bolted to the angle ring at the smokebox front, to facilitate less cramped access to the blower equipment, superheater header and tubes.

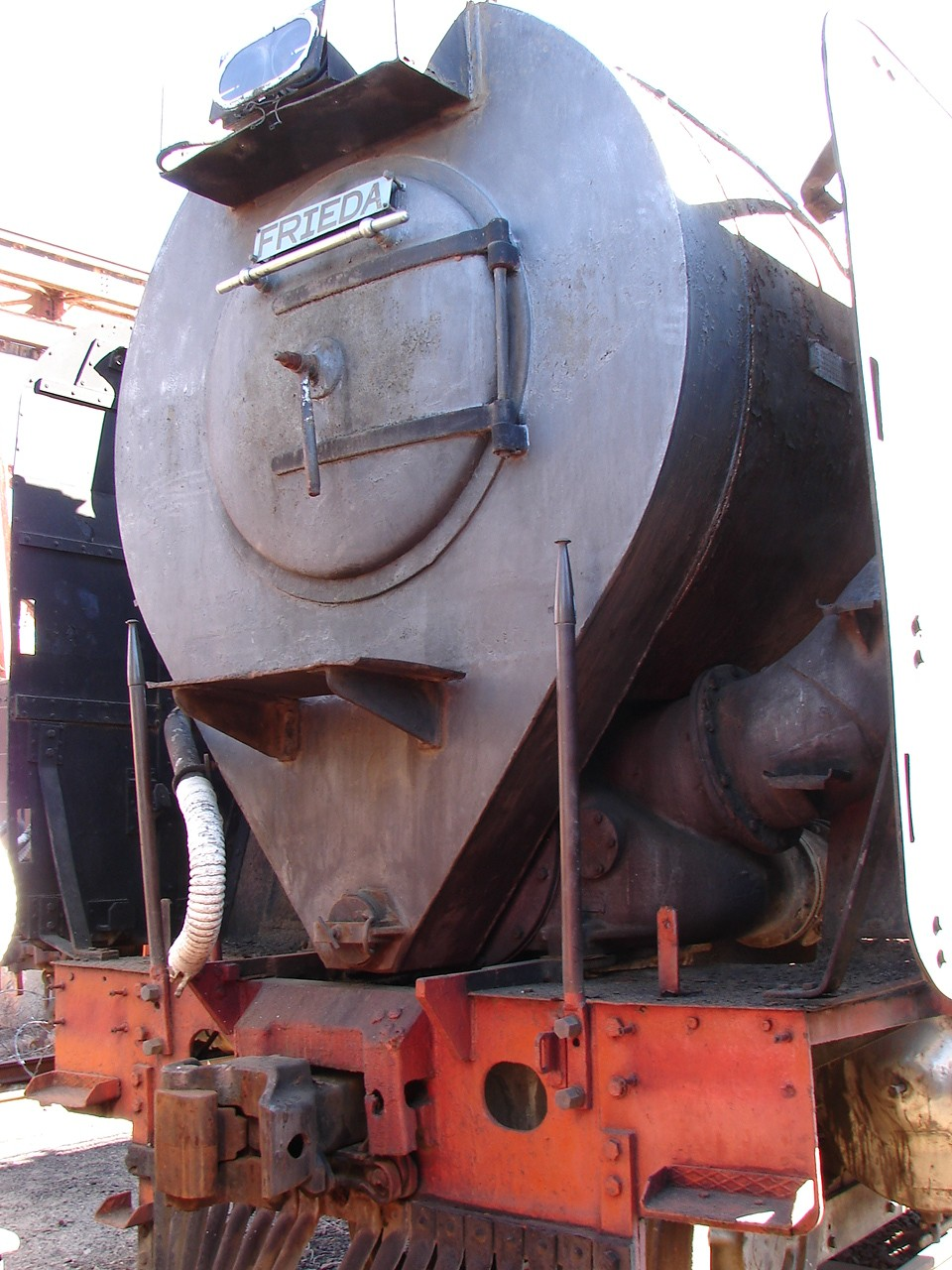
Banjo-face smokebox front

The draft turbine gave the locomotive its characteristic whining sound while running. As delivered, the Class 25 had the usual round smokebox front, but this was later modified by adding a banjo-shaped extension to also cover the exhaust steam turbine. Spent steam was fed through a thick pipe on the engine's left hand side back to the condensing tender.

The banjo-shaped extension modification to the front of the smokebox was found necessary to cope with the copious amounts of char generated by brittle Witbank coal and mechanical stoking, since the original Henschel design proved to have too little capacity to keep accumulated char away from the exhaust turbine. Most of the char was collected in the trough of the banjo at the bottom of the smokebox front from where it was periodically ejected through a vertical steam ejector pipe inside the banjo door which exhausted immediately in front of the chimney.

In service, the turbine-induced draft of the Class 25 actually performed better than the regular draft of the Class 25NC. One advantage of the condenser was that while getting up steam, the blower could be opened at a boiler pressure of about 15 to 20 pounds per square inch (103 to 138 kilopascals) to start the fan spinning, which drew the fire and accelerated getting up steam pressure. On a non-condensing locomotive the blower would be weak while steam pressure was still low.

Timken roller bearings, from Canton, Ohio, USA were used throughout, including on the three-axle tender bogies, the coupling and connecting rods as well as the crosshead gudgeon pins, while the locomotive's leading bogies and coupled wheels had Cannon-type axle boxes. Compared to earlier SAR practice, a novelty was the adoption of mechanical lubrication. A sixteen-feed lubricator was driven off the reversing link trunion. Since the Class 25 was entirely mounted on roller bearings, very little effort was required to move these huge locomotives.

The cylinders and frames were cast and machined in the USA in one piece while the steel cylinders and steam chests were fitted with cast iron liners. The tender frame was also a one-piece steel casting. The Alligator type crossheads were split on the vertical centre line and clamped on to the end of the piston rods, which had three coned rings engaging in grooves in the crossheads. The original coupling rods differed from the usual in the provision of three independent rods, thereby doing away with four knuckle joints and pins.

The locomotive was able to negotiate curves with a radius of 275 feet (84 metres), with 1/4 inch (6 millimetres) gauge widening and 4 1/2 inches (114 millimetres) superelevation. The wheels, axles and axle boxes of the leading bogie were designed to be interchangeable with those of the Class 15F, while the wheels and axles of the trailing bogie were interchangeable with those of the Class 24's trailing bogie.

The locomotive's brakes were operated by two 24 inches (610 millimetres) diameter cylinders on the engine and four 21 inches (533 millimetres) diameter cylinders on the tender. The brake rigging on the tender bogies were independent of each other and the front tender bogie was equipped with a hand brake. The engine and tender brake pipelines were fitted with delaying valves which delayed brake application on the locomotive until a predetermined degree of braking had been established throughout the train. A separate driver's brake valve permitted the continued application of locomotive brakes while the train brakes were being released or vacuum was being built up.

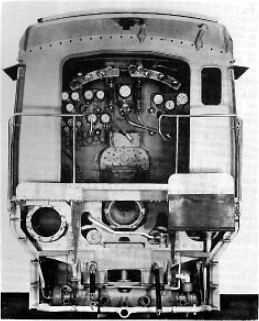
Engine cab, connections for steam pipe at left and mechanical stoker at centre below footplate

Almost one third of the total length of the Type CZ condensing tender was taken up by the coal bunker, which included the oil separator equipment to remove oil from spent steam and the mechanical stoker equipment which had a maximum delivery rate of 12,000 pounds (5,443 kilograms) of coal per hour. The rear two-thirds was taken up by eight large radiators on each side, cooled by five steam-driven roof-mounted fans. The 5,000 imperial gallons (22,700 litres) water capacity consisted of two tanks, a 4,400 imperial gallons (20,000 litres) fresh water tank in the centre of the tender between the radiators and a 600 imperial gallons (2,730 litres) condensate tank under the tender belly between the bogies. Feedwater was taken directly from the condensate tank's hot contents rather than from the main tank's cold contents.

Since the temperature of the condensed feedwater was too high for the use of ordinary injectors, the boiler was fed by two turbo-pumps located under the cab. Each pump had a capacity of approximately 88 imperial gallons (400 litres) per minute.

The system proved to be extremely efficient and reduced water consumption by as much as 90% by using the same water up to eight times over, giving the Class 25 locomotive a range of 800 kilometres (500 miles) between water refills. In addition, the hot condensate feedwater resulted in a 7% reduction in coal consumption.

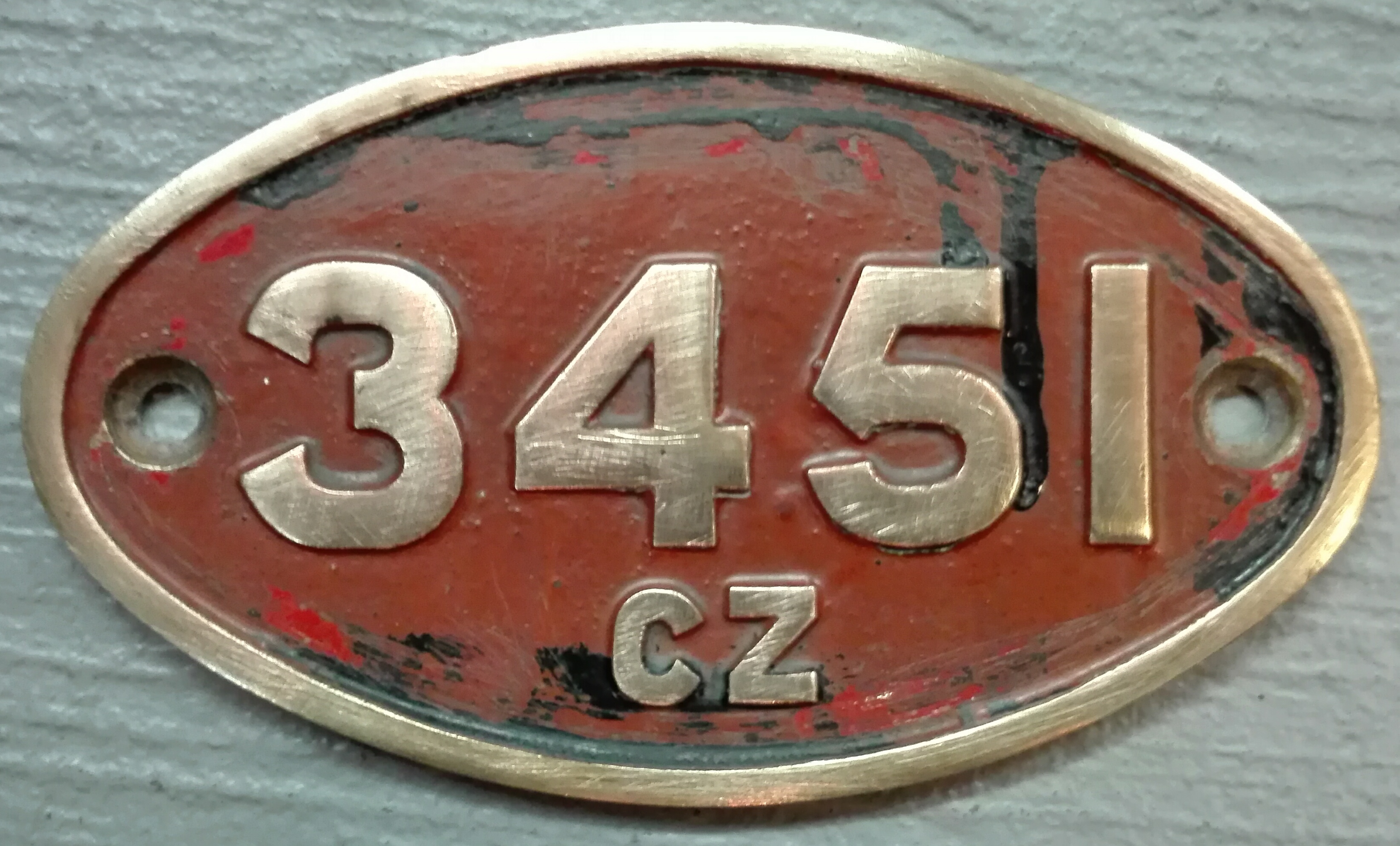
Tender plate

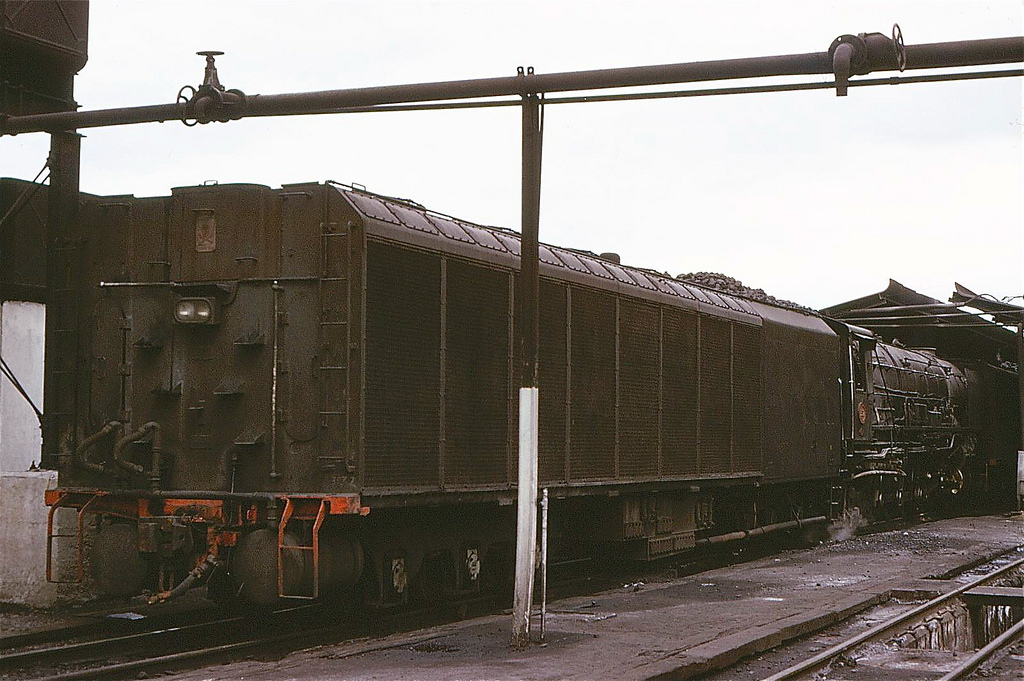
Class 25 Condenser Tender

The condensing tenders were rather appropriately classified as Type CZ, since CZ is also the motor vehicle registration letters of Beaufort West, the capital town of the Karoo where the Class 25 was to serve. Since spent steam was not expelled through the chimney, the condensers sounded unlike any other steam locomotive on South African rails. Their non-condensing and free exhausting Class 25NC sister locomotives had the usual sharp bark of a steam locomotive, especially under load, while the condensing Class 25 had more of a hoarse hollow chuff sound in addition to its turbine whine.

== Teething troubles ==
Soon after being placed in service, problems were experienced with failing connecting rods, big end bearings breaking up as well as cracks developing in the motion girder of the Alligator crossheads. After investigations by SAR engineers with assistance from South Africa's Council for Scientific and Industrial Research (CSIR), the crossheads, slide bars and coupling rods were modified. The crossheads were converted to the multiple-bearing type with single guide bars, a more sophisticated method of filtering out the cylinder and valve lubricant from the exhaust steam replaced the original centrifuge while the three independent coupling rods were replaced with the more conventional single coupling rod with knuckle joints.

When new, the tapered Timken crankpin roller bearings soon became notorious for throwing their lubricant onto the underside of the boiler, from where it ran down to the lowest point and dripped onto the coupled wheel tyres along the way. This manufacturer's fault also applied to the Class 25NC and was one of the reasons for the reputation of both classes of being slippery. Timken managed to resolve the problem before all their bearings had been replaced, but by then about two-thirds of the locomotives had already been fitted with redesigned coupling rods with SKF crankpin ball bearings.

Considerable trouble was also experienced with the induced draught equipment. The blower blades suffered heavy edge wear from solid particles in the exhaust and blade fractures occurred in both the blower and steam turbine wheels which called for intense investigation by SAR engineers, Henschel representatives and the CSIR.

An initial attempt to solve the blade fracture problem by increasing the breadth of the blade roots from 7 to 14 millimetres (0.28 to 0.55 inches) was unsuccessful. Fatigue tests and stress analysis by the CSIR showed that both sizes of blades failed due to fatigue at the sharp fillets as a result of the repeated changes in the centrifugal load due to variations in the turbine rotational speed. The solution was arrived at when it was realised that none of the single "lock" blades, which were supported by two conical pins, of any rotor had ever failed. When such conical pins were also introduced between all the other blades in the rotors, fatigue tests showed that this made them considerably stronger. Some time later it was found that welding the blades onto the rotor edge proved to be a good cheaper alternative. The design was eventually amended with the redesigned exhaust fan being manufactured from manganese steel and the problem was solved.

== Service ==
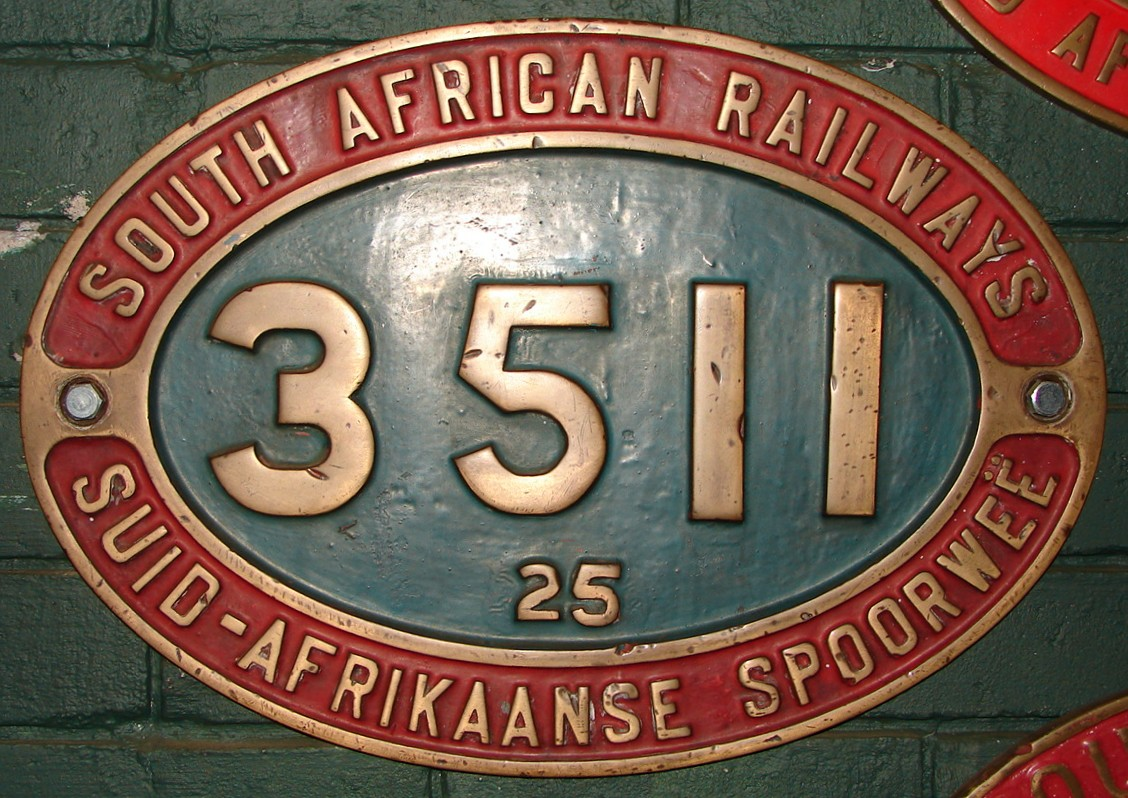

The Class 25 was built specifically for work in the Karoo and the Kalahari, where water is a scarce resource. They initially served on the unelectrified mainline from Touws River via Beaufort West to De Aar where they handled all goods and passenger traffic, including top-line passenger trains like the Blue Train. When the section from Touws River to Beaufort West was electrified, the Class 25 continued working between Beaufort West and De Aar, but it now also worked between De Aar and Kimberley, across from Kimberley to Bloemfontein to the east as well as westward from Kimberley to Postmasburg, Sishen and Hotazel in the Kalahari. From Postmasburg they worked iron and manganese ore to Bloemfontein, where relays of Free State power took over to Harrismith.

== Rebuilding ==
The Class 25 was a complex locomotive which required high maintenance, especially on the turbine blower fans in the smokebox, the blades of which needed to be replaced frequently due to damage by solid particles in the exhaust. The equally complex condensing tender also needed frequent maintenance. Between 1973 and 1980, after serving for twenty years, and partially accelerated by the introduction of electric and diesel-electric traction over routes which were previously served exclusively by the Class 25, all but three of the condensing locomotives, numbers 3451, 3511 and 3540, were converted to free exhausting and non-condensing locomotives as they went through the workshops for major overhauls. The converted locomotives were reclassified to Class 25NC.

It has been suggested that, had the Class 25 been modified to produce less black smoke or char as a result of incomplete combustion, in accordance with the Gas Producer Combustion System (GPCS) principles, which were applied by mechanical engineer David Wardale when he rebuilt a Class 25NC locomotive to the Class 26 Red Devil, the problem of char damage to the fan blades could have been largely eliminated. The GPCS program, however, only began near the end of the conversion of the Class 25s.

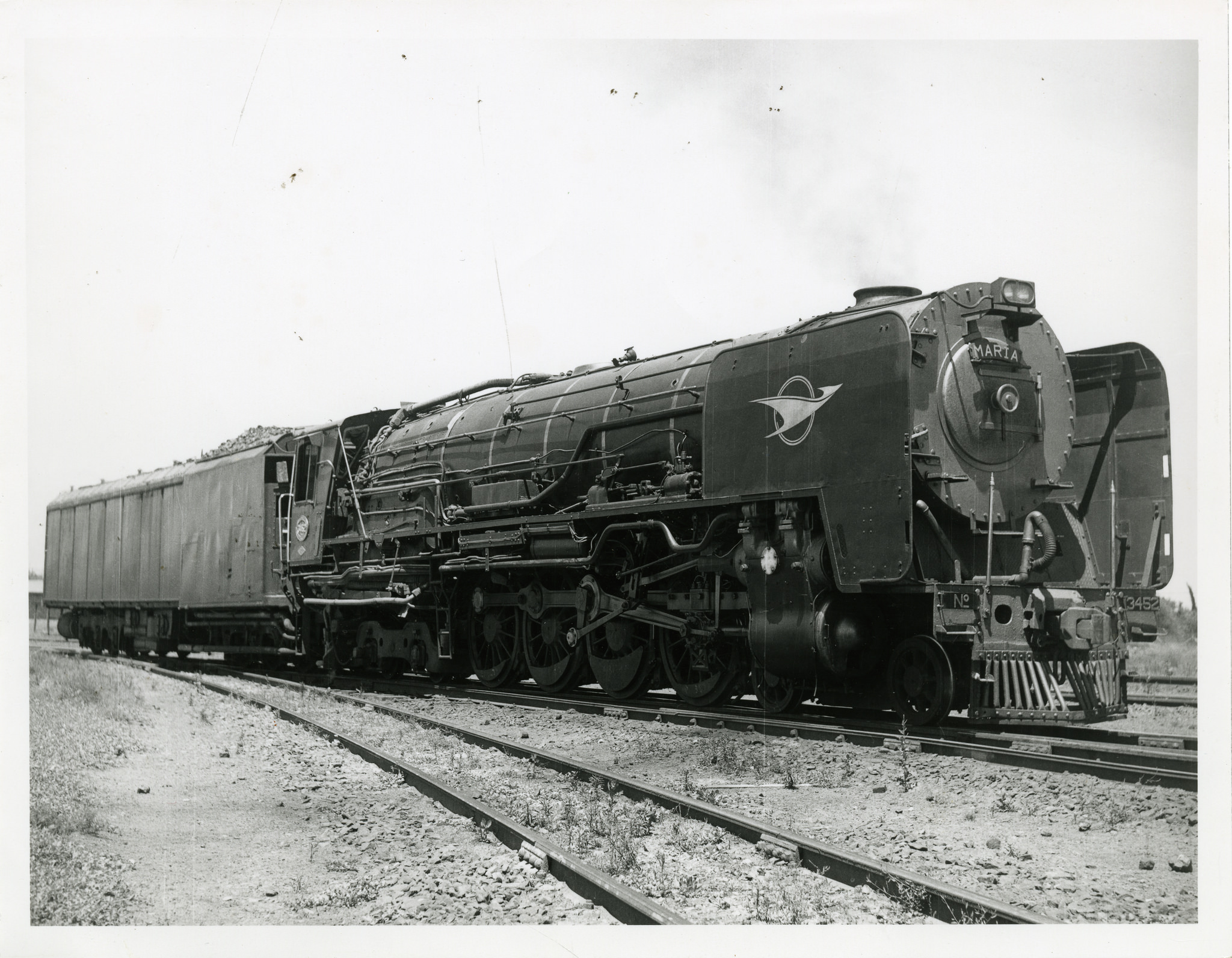
25NC 4-8-4 3452

The first conversion was done at De Aar on no. 3452, and consisted of the turbine and exhaust pipe being removed from the smokebox and replaced with a blastpipe and chimney. The tender was stripped of its condensing equipment, but retained its original fresh water and condensate tanks and feed pumps, with the radiator framing and roof panelled over. The locomotive's general appearance therefore changed little, but while the conversion of no. 3452 was aesthetically superior when compared with subsequent conversions, it did not carry enough water.

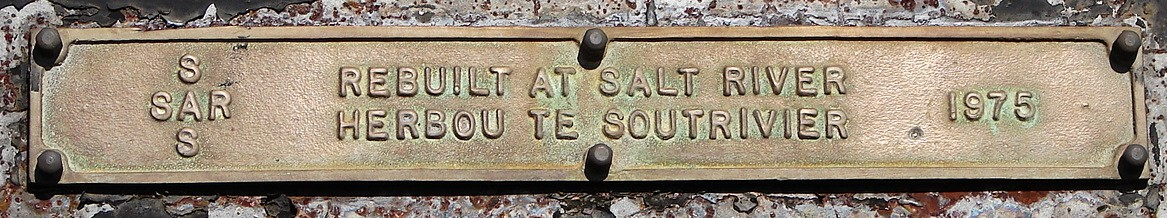
Salt River Shops rebuild plate

The rest of the fleet was rebuilt at the Salt River shops in Cape Town. In the process, their condensing tenders were also rebuilt to ordinary coal-and-water tenders, by removing the condensing radiators and roof fans, and replacing them with a massive round-topped water tank.

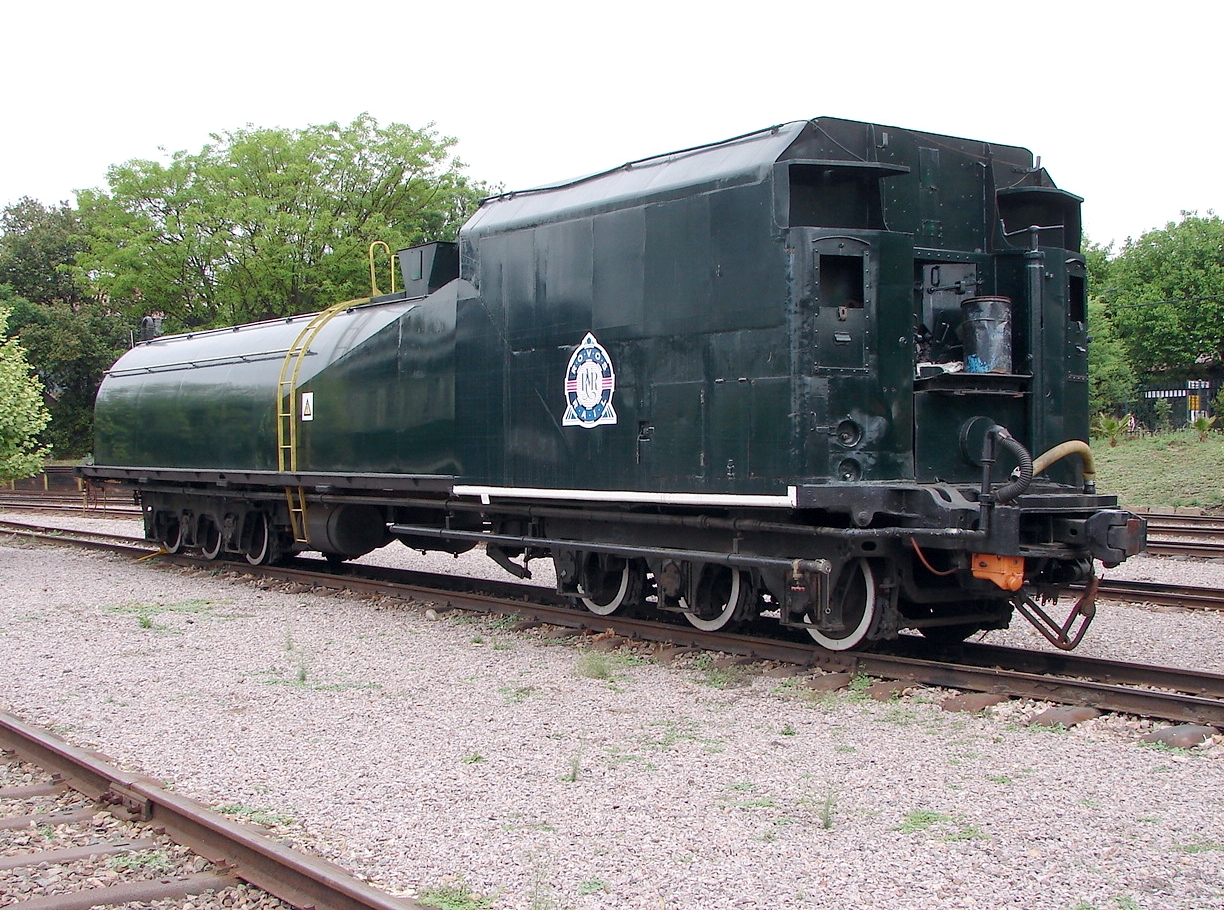
Type EW2 Worshond tender

The shape and appearance of the tender conversion was dictated by strength considerations. Shortening the tender frame was considered, but it was eventually retained as it was. To replicate the Class 25NC tender tank and bunker on the longer Type CZ tender frame would have exceeded the permissible axle loading by a considerable amount. The long cast-steel frame of the tender was very flexible, but the radiator framing and roof contributed a great deal to the vertical stiffness. The final form of the rebuilt tender's tank supplied enough strength, with its semi-circular top welded to the original fresh water tank via the fan supports and the long triangular gussets set into the bunker sides which extended past the midpoint of the frame. Locomotives with rebuilt tenders were soon nicknamed Worshond, Afrikaans for dachshund and literally translated as sausage dog. The worshond tenders were reclassified as Type EW2.

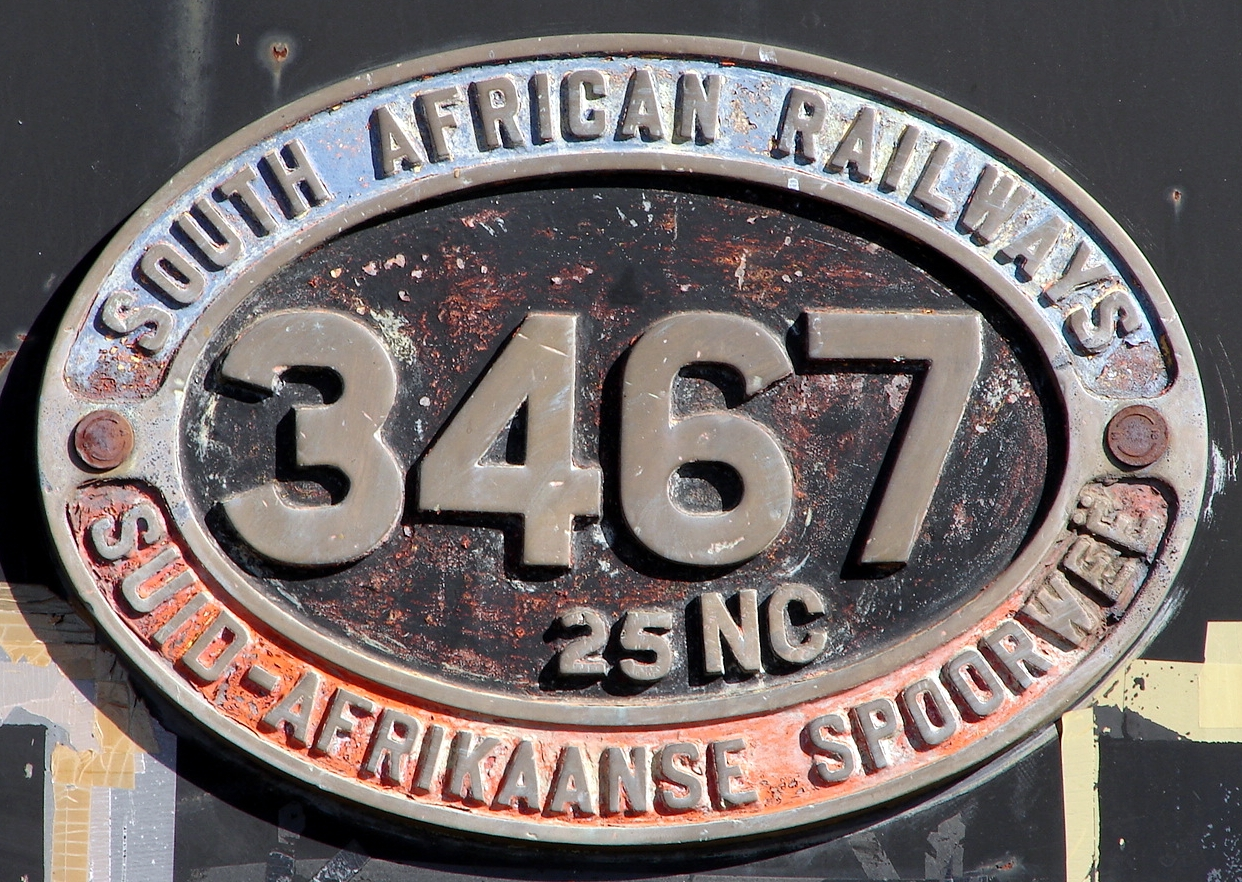
Class 25Nc 3467 (NC added on number plate after conversion)

When the Class 25 condensers were converted to Class 25NC non-condensers, their number plates were copied and recast with the additional "NC" for "non-condensing" squeezed in next to the existing "25", which resulted in a lopsided class indication on their plates. Locomotives with all four characters neatly in line and centred were therefore usually identifiable as original Class 25NCs. After they were relieved of their condensing gear, these locomotives served for another eleven years, before being withdrawn from service by the SAR when steam was completely replaced by electric and diesel-electric traction.

== Preservation ==
The following 25 class have survived. Both are still owned by the Transnet Heritage Foundation. Neither are operational.

Number	Works No.	Transnet Heritage Foundation / Private	Leaselend / Owner	Current Location	Notes
3451	Hensc 28730	Transnet Heritage Foundation	Steamnet 2000	Germiston Locomotive Depot	
3511	NBL 27371	Transnet Heritage Foundation	Steamnet 2000	Kimberley Locomotive Depot	

== Works numbers ==
The locomotive numbers, builders, works numbers and tender builders are listed in the table. On the builders' works lists, all the locomotives are shown as having been built in 1953. The tenders were numbered in the range from 3451 to 3540 for their engines while the additional spare tender which was built at Salt River in 1963 was numbered 3541. All tenders bore the same works number as the engines they were all built with, except the 60 tenders which were built by Henschel for engines which were built by North British Locomotive Company Ltd. These 60 were allocated Henschel works numbers.

Class 25 4-8-4 Condenser Builders, Works Numbers & Tender Builders
Loco no.	Builder	Works no.	Tender builder	Tender Works no.
3451	Henschel	28730	Henschel	
3452	NBL	27312	Henschel	28780
3453	NBL	27313	Henschel	28781
3454	NBL	27314	Henschel	28782
3455	NBL	27315	Henschel	28783
3456	NBL	27316	Henschel	28784
3457	NBL	27317	Henschel	28785
3458	NBL	27318	Henschel	28786
3459	NBL	27319	Henschel	28787
3460	NBL	27320	Henschel	28788
3461	NBL	27321	Henschel	28789
3462	NBL	27322	Henschel	28790
3463	NBL	27323	Henschel	28791
3464	NBL	27324	Henschel	28792
3465	NBL	27325	Henschel	28793
3466	NBL	27326	Henschel	28794
3467	NBL	27327	Henschel	28795
3468	NBL	27328	Henschel	28796
3469	NBL	27329	Henschel	28797
3470	NBL	27330	Henschel	28798
3471	NBL	27331	Henschel	28799
3472	NBL	27332	Henschel	28800
3473	NBL	27333	Henschel	28801
3474	NBL	27334	Henschel	28802
3475	NBL	27335	Henschel	28803
3476	NBL	27336	Henschel	28804
3477	NBL	27337	Henschel	28805
3478	NBL	27338	Henschel	28806
3479	NBL	27339	Henschel	28807
3480	NBL	27340	Henschel	28808
3481	NBL	27341	Henschel	28809
3482	NBL	27342	Henschel	28810
3483	NBL	27343	Henschel	28811
3484	NBL	27344	Henschel	28812
3485	NBL	27345	Henschel	28813
3486	NBL	27346	Henschel	28814
3487	NBL	27347	Henschel	28815
3488	NBL	27348	Henschel	28816
3489	NBL	27349	Henschel	28817
3490	NBL	27350	Henschel	28818
3491	NBL	27351	Henschel	28819
3492	NBL	27352	Henschel	28820
3493	NBL	27353	Henschel	28821
3494	NBL	27354	Henschel	28822
3495	NBL	27355	Henschel	28823
3496	NBL	27356	Henschel	28824
3497	NBL	27357	Henschel	28825
3498	NBL	27358	Henschel	28826
3499	NBL	27359	Henschel	28827
3500	NBL	27360	Henschel	28828
3501	NBL	27361	Henschel	28829
3502	NBL	27362	Henschel	28830
3503	NBL	27363	Henschel	28831
3504	NBL	27364	Henschel	28832
3505	NBL	27365	Henschel	28833
3506	NBL	27366	Henschel	28834
3507	NBL	27367	Henschel	28835
3508	NBL	27368	Henschel	28836
3509	NBL	27369	Henschel	28837
3510	NBL	27370	Henschel	28838
3511	NBL	27371	Henschel	28839
3512	NBL	27372	NBL	
3513	NBL	27373	NBL	
3514	NBL	27374	NBL	
3515	NBL	27375	NBL	
3516	NBL	27376	NBL	
3517	NBL	27377	NBL	
3518	NBL	27378	NBL	
3519	NBL	27379	NBL	
3520	NBL	27380	NBL	
3521	NBL	27381	NBL	
3522	NBL	27382	NBL	
3523	NBL	27383	NBL	
3524	NBL	27384	NBL	
3525	NBL	27385	NBL	
3526	NBL	27386	NBL	
3527	NBL	27387	NBL	
3528	NBL	27388	NBL	
3529	NBL	27389	NBL	
3530	NBL	27390	NBL	
3531	NBL	27391	NBL	
3532	NBL	27392	NBL	
3533	NBL	27393	NBL	
3534	NBL	27394	NBL	
3535	NBL	27395	NBL	
3536	NBL	27396	NBL	
3537	NBL	27397	NBL	
3538	NBL	27398	NBL	
3539	NBL	27399	NBL	
3540	NBL	27400	NBL	
			SAR	3541

== Illustration ==
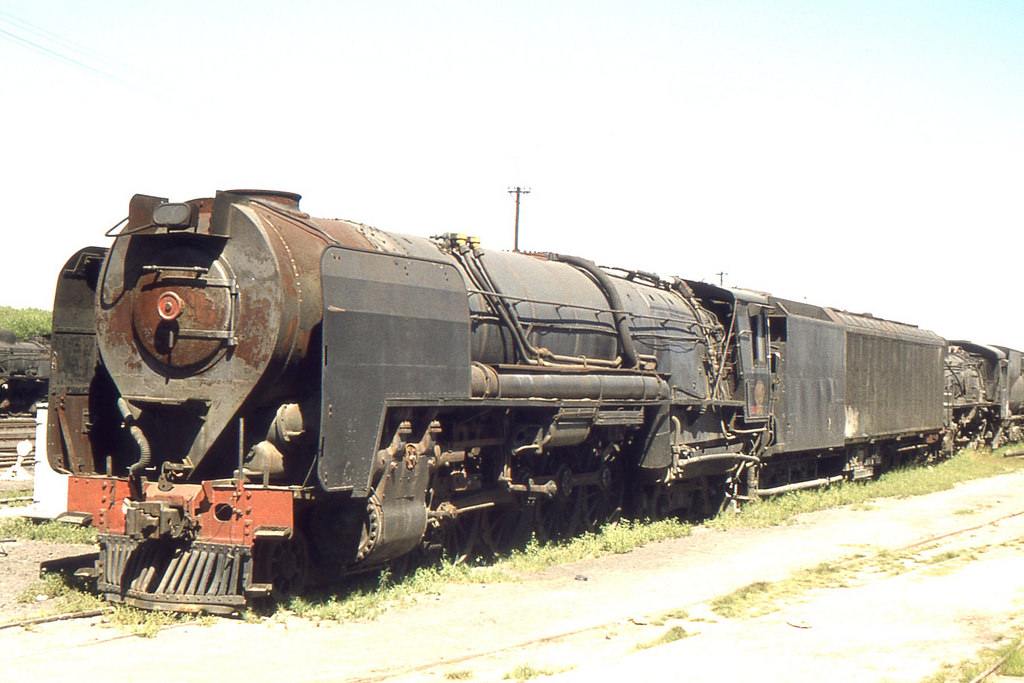
25 3451 stored De Aar shed 1970s

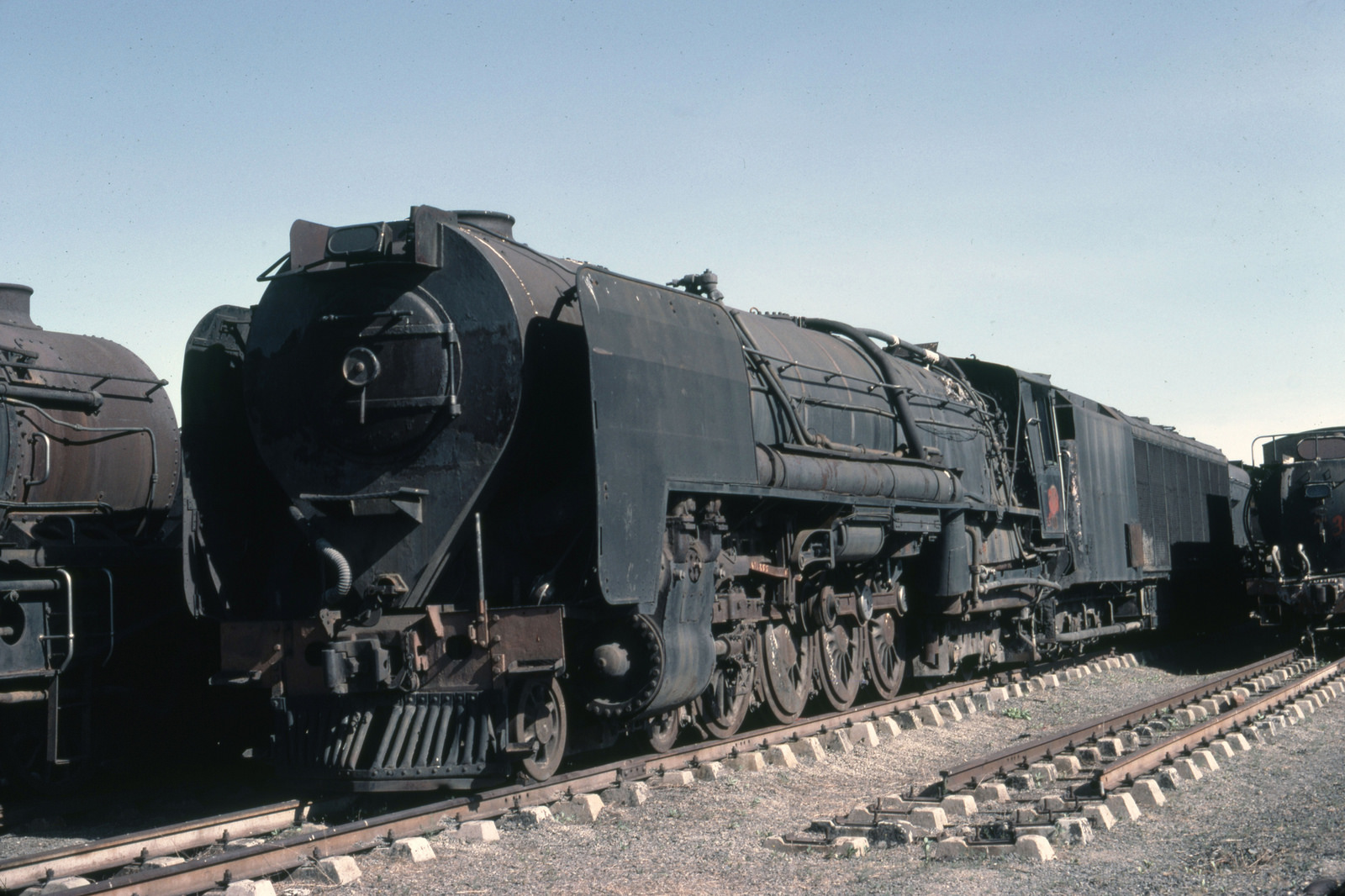
Class 25 3451 stored De Aar 1980s

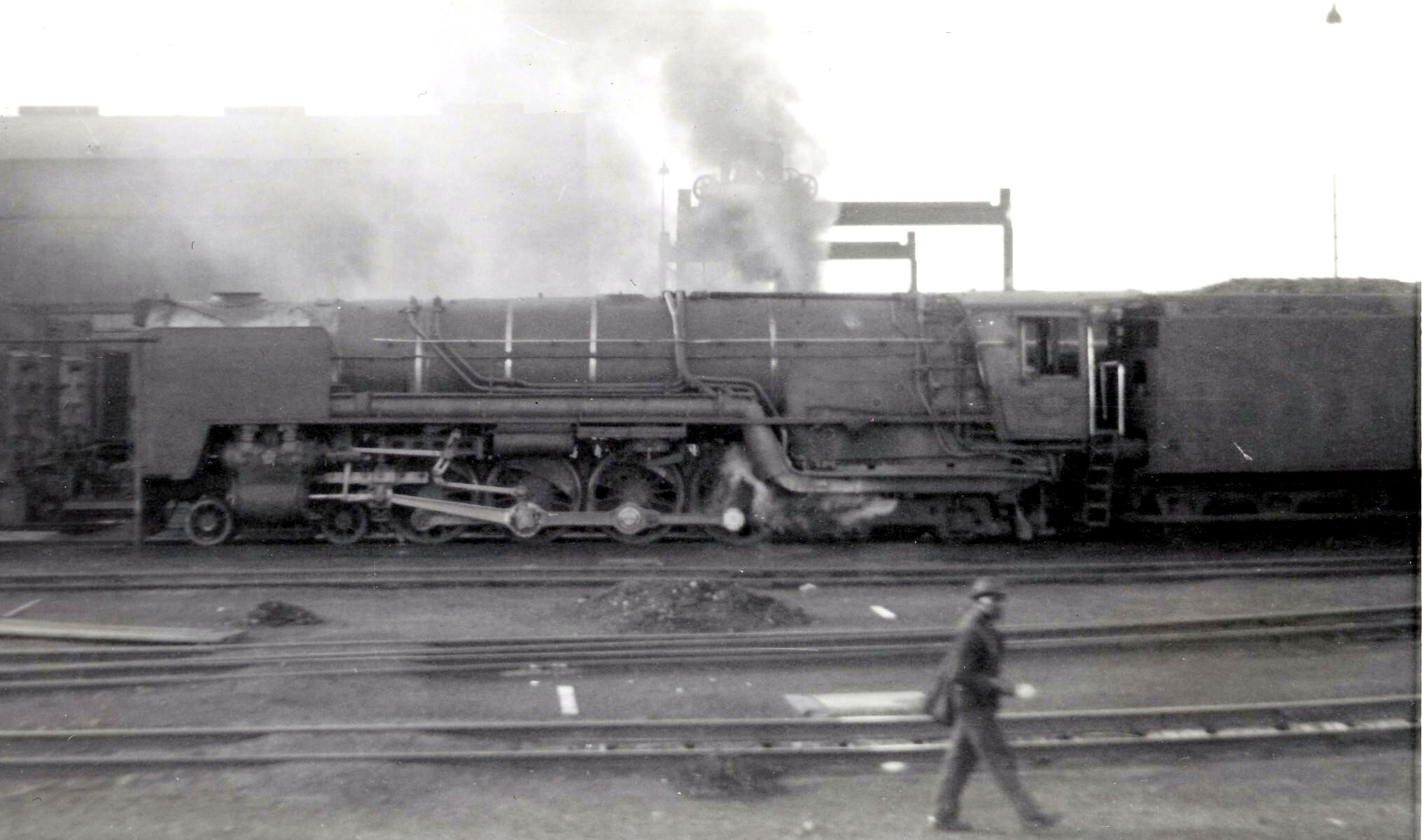
No. 3537 in steam at Beaufort West, 26 June 1968

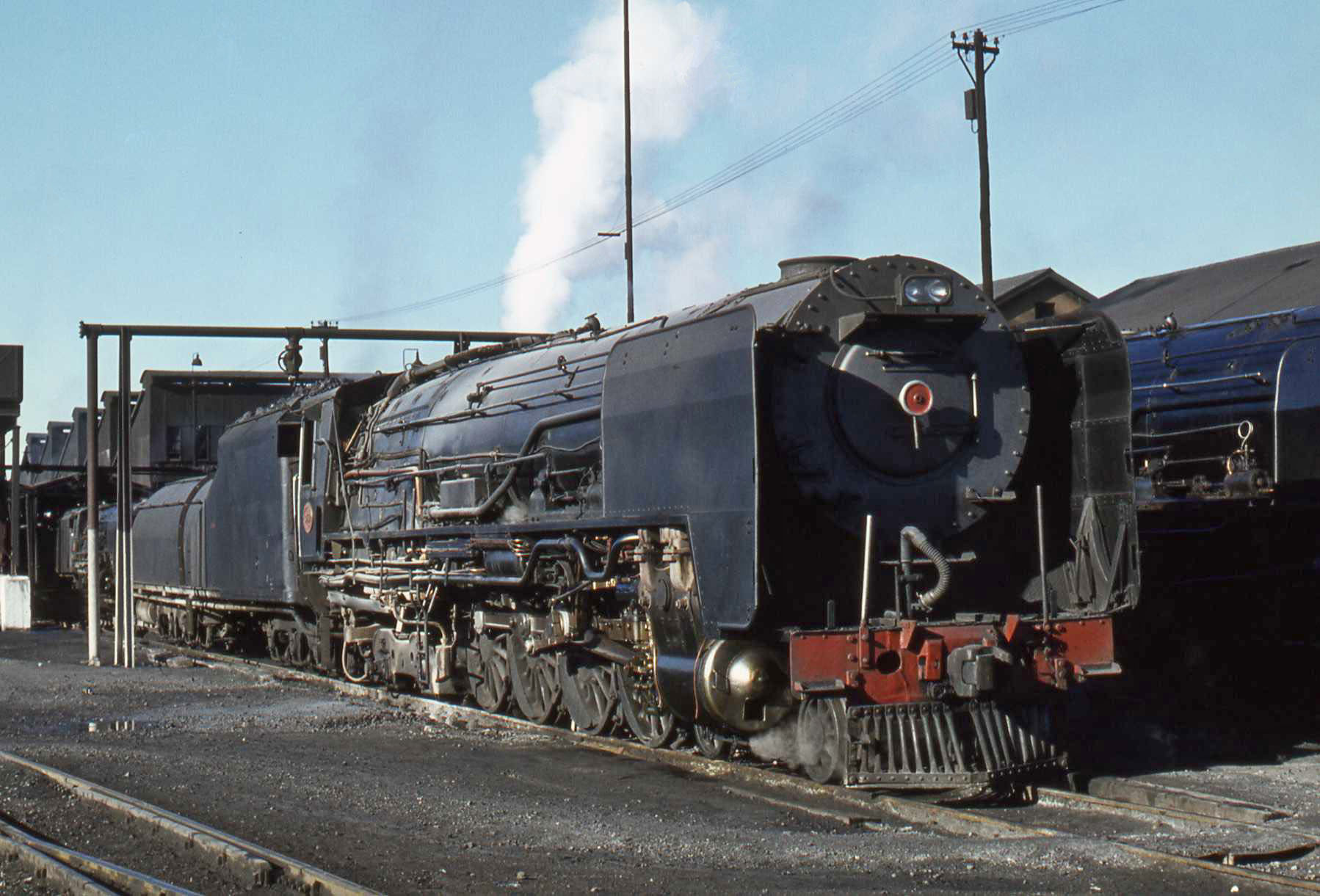
NBL-built ex condenser no. 3464 with a Worshond tender, De Aar, 6 April 1979

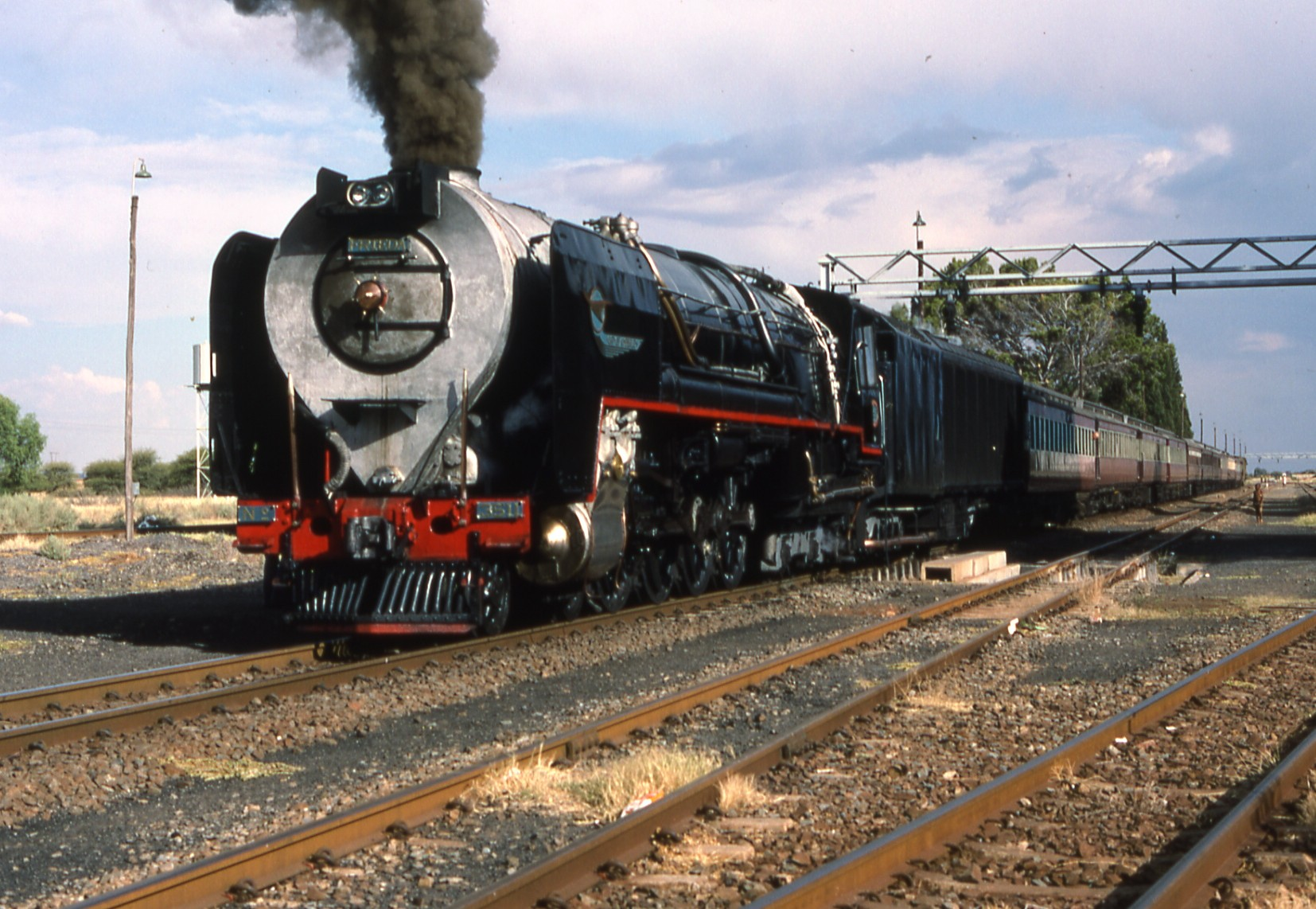
No. 3511 Frieda at Pudimoe on the Mafeking line, c. 1991

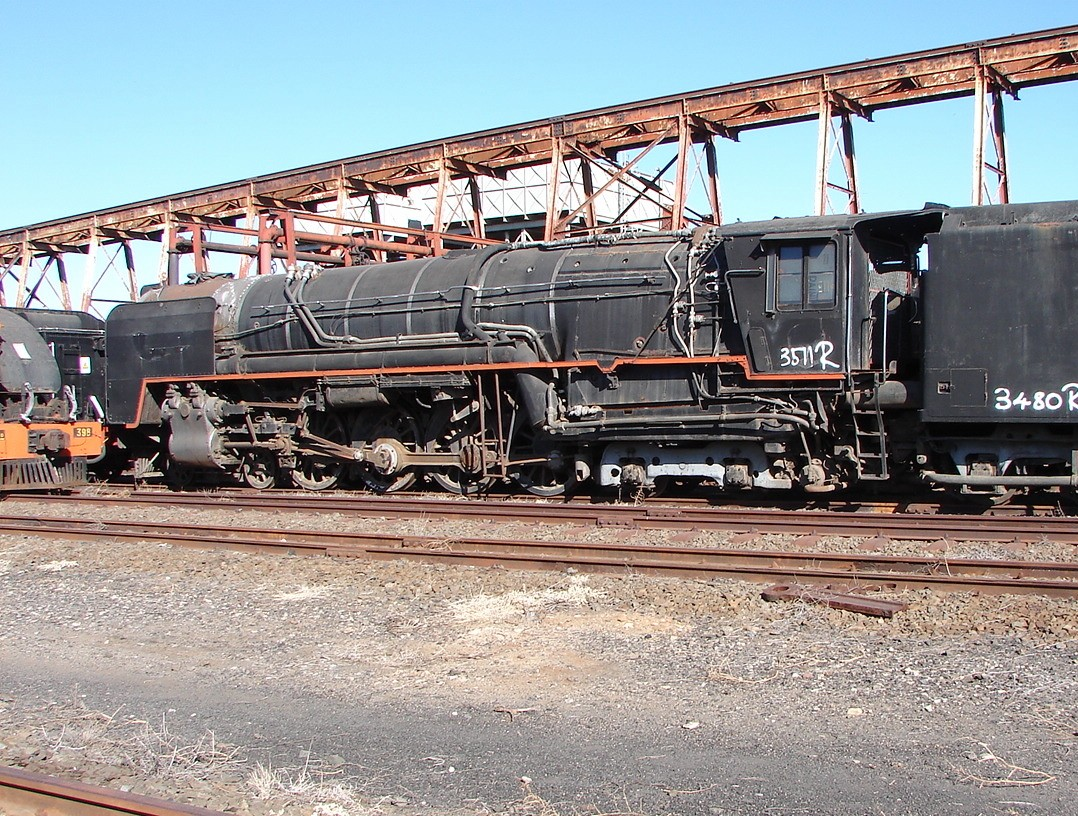
No. 3511 Frieda staged at Beaconsfield, 17 September 2009

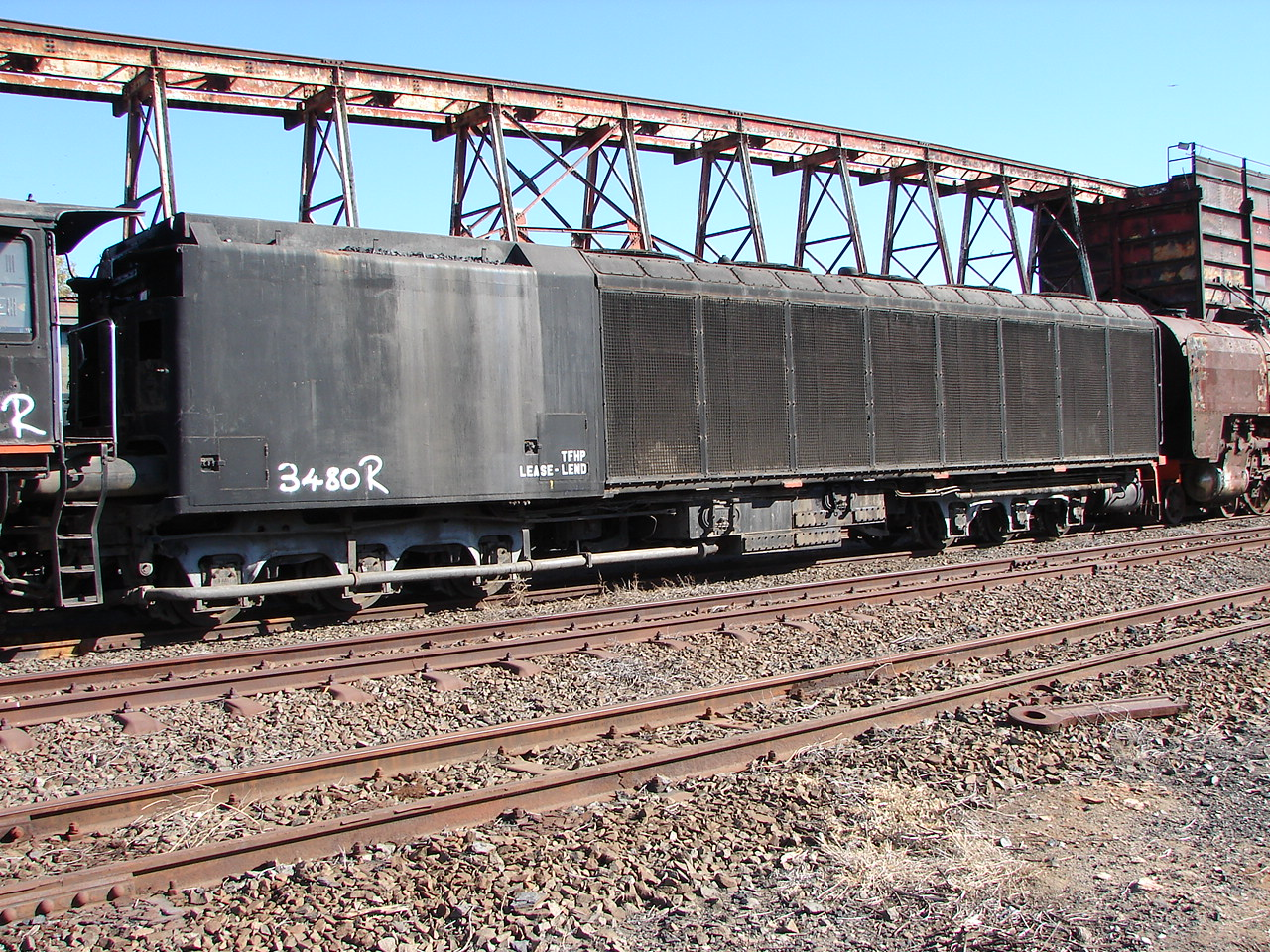
Type CZ condensing tender no. 3480, Beaconsfield, 17 September 2009
