= South African Class 20 2-10-2 =

1935 design of steam locomotive

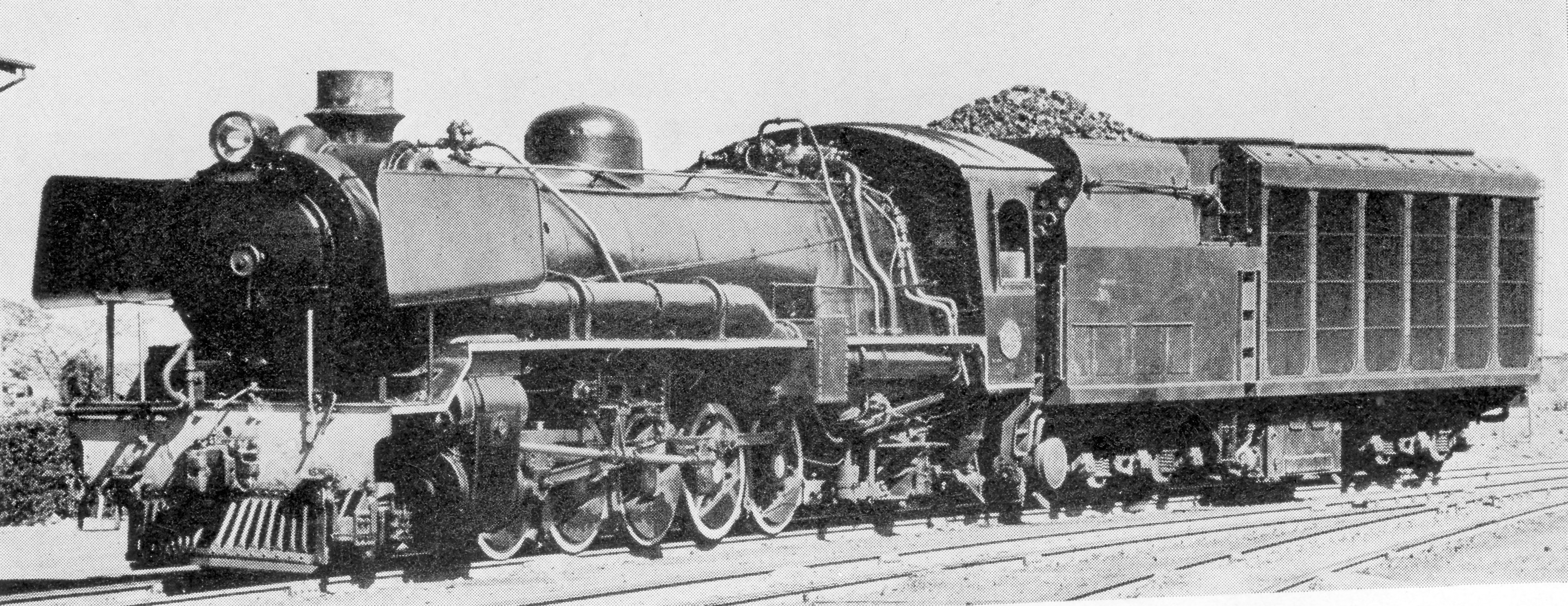
- No. 2485 as experimental condenser, c. 1950
Type and origin
- ♠ Type MP1 tender - ♥ Type MT2 tender ♣ Type CL condensing tender
- Power type: Steam
- Designer: South African Railways (A.G. Watson)
- Builder: South African Railways
- Model: Class 20
- Build date: 1935
- Total produced: 1
- Rebuilder: South African Railways
- Rebuild date: 1950
- Number rebuilt: 1 to condensing locomotive
Specifications
- Configuration
  - Whyte: 2-10-2 (Santa Fe)
  - UIC: 1'E1'h2
- Driver: 3rd coupled axle
- Gauge: 3 ft 6 in (1,067 mm) Cape gauge
- Leading dia.: 28 1/2 in (724 mm)
- Coupled dia.: 48 in (1,219 mm)
- Trailing dia.: 34 in (864 mm)
- Tender wheels: ♠♥♣ 34 in (864 mm)
- Wheelbase: ♠ 59 ft 6 1/8 in (18,139 mm) ♣ 77 ft 8 7/8 in (23,695 mm)
  - Engine: 31 ft 7 1/2 in (9,639 mm)
  - Coupled: 17 ft (5,182 mm)
  - Tender: ♠ 16 ft 9 in (5,105 mm) ♥ 20 ft 5 in (6,223 mm) ♣ 33 ft 5 in (10,185 mm)
  - Tender bogie: ♠ 4 ft 7 in (1,397 mm) ♥ 6 ft 2 in (1,880 mm) ♣ 8 ft 8 in (2,642 mm)
- Length
  - Over couplers: ♠ 68 ft 1 in (20,752 mm) ♣ 88 ft 5 1/2 in (26,962 mm)
- Height: 12 ft 11 1/4 in (3,943 mm)
- Frame type: Bar
- Axle load: ♠♥ 11 LT 14 cwt (11,890 kg) ♣ 13 LT (13,210 kg)
  - Leading: ♠♥ 8 LT 2 cwt (8,230 kg) ♣ 9 LT 5 cwt (9,398 kg)
  - 1st coupled: ♠♥ 11 LT 6 cwt (11,480 kg) ♣ 12 LT 16 cwt (13,010 kg)
  - 2nd coupled: ♠♥ 11 LT 10 cwt (11,680 kg) ♣ 13 LT (13,210 kg)
  - 3rd coupled: ♠♥ 11 LT 14 cwt (11,890 kg) ♣ 11 LT 12 cwt (11,790 kg)
  - 4th coupled: ♠♥ 11 LT 4 cwt (11,380 kg) ♣ 11 LT 12 cwt (11,790 kg)
  - 5th coupled: ♠♥ 11 LT 3 cwt (11,330 kg) ♣ 11 LT 12 cwt 3 qtr (11,820 kg)
  - Trailing: ♠♥ 8 LT 18 cwt (9,043 kg) ♣ 9 LT 9 cwt 1 qtr (9,614 kg)
  - Tender bogie: Bogie 1: ♠ 27 LT 10 cwt (27,940 kg) ♥ 33 LT 18 cwt (34,440 kg) ♣ 41 LT 13 cwt 1 qtr (42,330 kg); Bogie 2: ♠ 23 LT 11 cwt (23,930 kg) ♥ 35 LT 10 cwt (36,070 kg) ♣ 37 LT 3 cwt 1 qtr (37,760 kg)
  - Tender axle: ♠ 13 LT 15 cwt (13,970 kg) ♥ 17 LT 15 cwt (18,030 kg) ♣ 13 LT 17 cwt 3 qtr (14,110 kg)
- Adhesive weight: ♠♥ 56 LT 17 cwt (57,760 kg) ♣ 60 LT 12 cwt 3 qtr (61,610 kg)
- Loco weight: ♠♥ 73 LT 7 cwt (74,530 kg) ♣ 79 LT 7 cwt (80,620 kg)
- Tender weight: ♠ 51 LT 1 cwt (51,870 kg) ♥ 69 LT 8 cwt (70,510 kg) ♣ 78 LT 16 cwt (80,060 kg)
- Total weight: ♠ 124 LT 8 cwt (126,400 kg) ♥ 142 LT 15 cwt (145,000 kg) ♣ 158 LT 3 cwt (160,700 kg)
- Tender type: ♠ MP1 (2-axle bogies) ♥ MT2 (2-axle bogies) ♣ CL (Buckeye 3-axle bogies); CL, MP1, MT2, MX, MY permitted
- Fuel type: Coal
- Fuel capacity: ♠ 10 LT (10.2 t) ♥ 14 LT (14.2 t) ♣ 11 LT 10 cwt (11.7 t)
- Water cap.: ♠ 4,250 imp gal (19,300 L) ♥ 6,000 imp gal (27,300 L) ♣ 3,900 imp gal (17,700 L)
- Firebox
  - Type: Round-top
  - Grate area: 36 sq ft (3.3 m^{2})
- Boiler
  - Pitch: 8 ft (2,438 mm)
  - Diameter: 4 ft 10 1/4 in (1,480 mm)
  - Tube plates: 20 ft 3/8 in (6,106 mm)
  - Small tubes: 86: 2 1/4 in (57 mm)
  - Large tubes: 18: 5 1/2 in (140 mm)
- Boiler pressure: 200 psi (1,379 kPa)
- Safety valve: Pop
- Heating surface
  - Firebox: 125 sq ft (11.6 m^{2})
  - Tubes: 1,527 sq ft (141.9 m^{2})
  - Arch tubes: 15 sq ft (1.4 m^{2})
  - Total surface: 1,667 sq ft (154.9 m^{2})
- Superheater
  - Heating area: 415 sq ft (38.6 m^{2})
- Cylinders: Two
- Cylinder size: 21 in (533 mm) bore 24 in (610 mm) stroke
- Valve gear: Rotary cam
- Valve type: Poppet
- Couplers: AAR knuckle
Performance figures
- Tractive effort: 33,080 lbf (147.1 kN) @ 75%
Career
- Operators: South African Railways
- Class: Class 20
- Number in class: 1
- Numbers: 2485
- Official name: Pretoria
- Nicknames: Trapsuutjies
- Delivered: 1935
- First run: 1935
- Withdrawn: 1958
- Scrapped: 1961
- The 3rd & 4th coupled axles had flangeless wheels

The South African Railways Class 20 2-10-2 of 1935 was a steam locomotive.

In 1935, the South African Railways placed one Class 20 steam locomotive with a 2-10-2 Santa Fe type wheel arrangement in service, designed and built at its Pretoria Mechanical Shops. In 1950, it was modified to an experimental condensing locomotive.

The Class 20 was the third locomotive type to be designed and built in South Africa, after the Natal Government Railways 4-6-2TT Havelock of 1888 and the Class 2C of 1910.

== Construction ==
The Class 20 2-10-2 Santa Fe type steam locomotive was designed in 1934 by A.G. Watson, Chief Mechanical Engineer of the South African Railways (SAR) from 1929 to 1936, and was built by the SAR at its Pretoria Mechanical Shops at Salvokop. The locomotive was intended for use on the South West Africa system, where the tracks consisted of 40 1/4 pounds per yard (20 kilograms per metre) section rail laid in desert conditions and practically without ballast. This restricted Watson to a maximum axle load of 11 long tons (11.2 tonnes) and he decided upon a Santa Fe type wheel arrangement with 48-inch (1,219-millimetre) diameter coupled wheels and flangeless driving and intermediate coupled wheels.

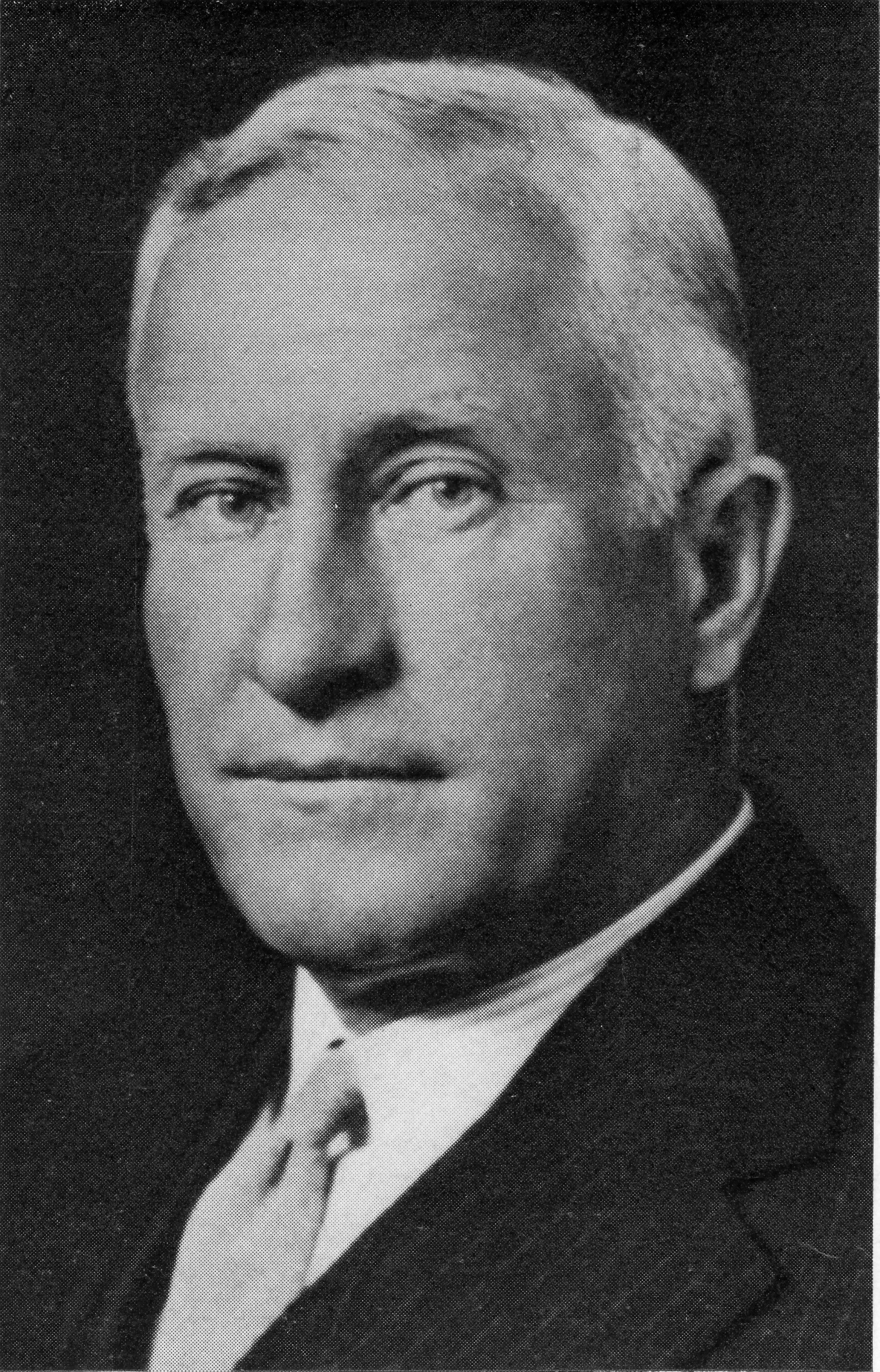
A.G. Watson

The sole Class 20 locomotive was numbered 2485. It was a hybrid, with a boiler which had been inherited from a Class 19A locomotive which had been equipped with a Watson Standard no. 1A boiler. The driving wheels were from scrapped Class 8 locomotives. The trailing pony truck was similar to that of the Class 19C, but the leading Bissel truck was specially designed. The bar frames and cylinders were imported.

Even though it was not wholly a South African product with its imported frames and cylinders and its inherited boiler from a Swiss-built locomotive, this was the third recorded instance of steam locomotives designed and constructed in South African workshops after the Natal Government Railways' engine Havelock of 1888 and the Class 2C of 1910.

== Characteristics ==
The cylinders, with rotary cam poppet valve gear, were identical to those of the Class 19C but with the stroke reduced from 26 inches (660 millimetres) to 24 inches (610 millimetres). The modified cylinder covers had deep spigots to suit the reduction in stroke. The main drive and valve gear drive was from the third pair of coupled wheels. Grease lubrication was provided for all coupled wheel axle boxes. The ten-coupled wheel arrangement, in conjunction with the sharp curvature of the lines in South West, necessitated special side play for the leading coupled wheel axle boxes and spherical bearings for the leading crank pins.

The design of the leading Bissel truck necessitated certain proportions to suit the ten-coupled wheel arrangement, but the trailing Bissel truck was similar to that of the Class 19C. Its axle boxes were provided with end thrust pad bearings attached to the axle box covers, which relieved the ends of the bearing from the effects of end thrust. This device proved successful in reducing the number of hot boxes on trailing Bissels.

The locomotive was tended by a Type MP1 tender with a 10 long tons (10.2 tonnes) coal capacity, a 4,250 imperial gallons (19,300 litres) water capacity and a 13 long tons 15 hundredweight (13,970 kilograms) axle load. The total weight of the engine and tender in full working order was 124 long tons 8 hundredweight (126,400 kilograms).

Watson disliked articulated locomotives and his aim with the Class 20 was to build an as powerful as possible non-articulated locomotive with a maximum 12 long tons (12.2 tonnes) axle load. The resulting Class 20 could be considered as Watson's answer to the Class GCA Garratt locomotive which had very similar weight and tractive effort capacities. The Class 20 carried more water and coal than the Garratt and was about 20 long tons (20.3 tonnes) heavier with 33,080 pounds-force (147.1 kilonewtons) tractive effort compared to the 28,470 pounds-force (126.6 kilonewtons) of the Class GCA. Even so, only one Class 20 was produced and the design was not repeated.

The construction of this sole Class 20 locomotive marked the beginning of a research process which was continued two years later with the construction of the sole Class 21 2-10-4 and which eventually culminated in the procurement of the Class 23 4-8-2 fleet in 1939.

== Service ==
The locomotive was intended for goods traffic on light rail in South West Africa, even though freight traffic volumes in that territory were hardly enough to justify such a powerful engine. It was sent to various branches in the Eastern Transvaal to undergo tests before it entered service in South West Africa, but after some evidence that the engine was rather severe on the light track, it was returned to South Africa after comparatively short service. It was then allocated to Pretoria for working on the Eastern Transvaal System where its power capacity could be used more productively.

Photographs show that, after being returned to Pretoria, the engine's Type MP1 tender was replaced by a larger Type MT2 tender with a 14 long tons (14.2 tonnes) coal capacity, a 6,000 imperial gallons (27,300 litres) water capacity and a 17 long tons 15 hundredweight (18,030 kilograms) axle load. The total weight of the engine and Type MT2 tender in full working order was 142 long tons 15 hundredweight (145,000 kilograms). The Pretoria enginemen considered the Class 20 to be one of their best locomotives since it was free-steaming, more than usually trouble-free and able to handle any load they gave it.

== Condensing trials ==
The arid nature of a large part of South Africa and the consequent difficulty to ensure adequate and suitable water supplies for steam locomotives led to a decision to experiment with condensing locomotives. Such locomotives had by then already been built by Henschel and Son for use in Argentina, 240 Kriegsloks for the Eastern Front in Germany in the 1930s and more than 4,000 units of the Russian SO^{K} class, mainly for use in Turkestan and other arid regions of the Soviet Union. In the pre-war years, the SAR considered modifying a Class 12A into a condensing locomotive, but this never happened.

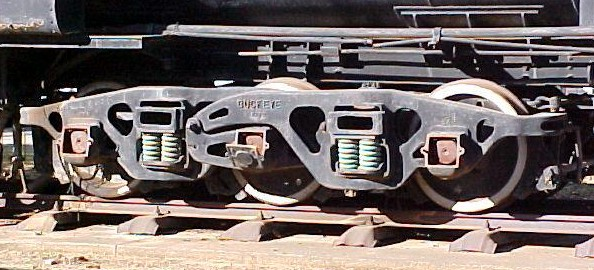
Buckeye bogie

In 1950, the Class 20 was modified to an experimental condensing locomotive in the Pretoria workshops, fitted with German Witte-style smoke deflectors, an extension to the chimney and a Type CL condensing tender which had been ordered from Henschel in 1948. This condensing tender, with Henschel works no. T28388, was designed for a Deutsche Reichsbahn Class 52 condensing locomotive. It was modified slightly and was equipped with a pair of Buckeye three-axle bogies instead of the German arrangement of one six-wheeled and one four-wheeled bogie. It had an 11 long tons (11.2 tonnes) coal capacity, a 3,900 imperial gallons (17,700 litres) water capacity and a 13 long tons 17 hundredweight 3 quarters (14,110 kilograms) axle load. The total weight of the modified engine and Type CL tender in full working order was 158 long tons 3 hundredweight (160,700 kilograms).

The Type CL tender was designed in such a way that it could also be used on a modified Class 19D or Class 24, but this was never done. The tender was capable of condensing 27,000 pounds (12,000 kilograms) of exhaust steam per hour in maximum operating temperatures of between 100 and 110 degrees Fahrenheit (38 and 43 degrees Celsius). As on the later Class 25 condensing locomotives, the pipe to feed spent steam back to the condensing tender was mounted on the left side of the engine. It was run back from the smokebox above the running board to a box that contained a centrifuge and filters to remove cylinder lubricant from the exhaust steam, then below the running board and underneath the cab to the tender. The tender had six large radiators on each side, cooled by three exhaust steam-driven roof-mounted fans which drew air from outside through the radiators.

Beginning in 1951, tests with the condensing Class 20, named Pretoria, were conducted in the Eastern Transvaal and the Karoo. It proved the viability of condensing locomotives in South Africa by attaining a saving of between 88% and 93% on water as well as a lower coal consumption, the latter brought about by the higher temperature of the condensed feedwater. Depending on the operating conditions, a water range of between 400 and 680 miles (640 and 1,090 kilometres) was achieved.

At the end of 1951, the locomotive was relocated to Touws River where it was used for further condensing tests and occasionally put to work in regular service. The positive results of the condensing trials led to the introduction of the Class 25 condensing locomotive fleet in 1953.

At that time, no. 2485 was again relocated, this time to De Aar for service on the section via Prieska to Upington on the line to Windhoek in South West Africa. It remained in service there until 1958. Even though its service record and uniqueness justified preservation, it was scrapped in 1961.

== Illustration ==
The pictures illustrate the Class 20 locomotive as built with a Type MP1 tender, then fitted with a larger capacity Type MT2 tender, and finally after modification to an experimental condensing locomotive with a Type CL tender.

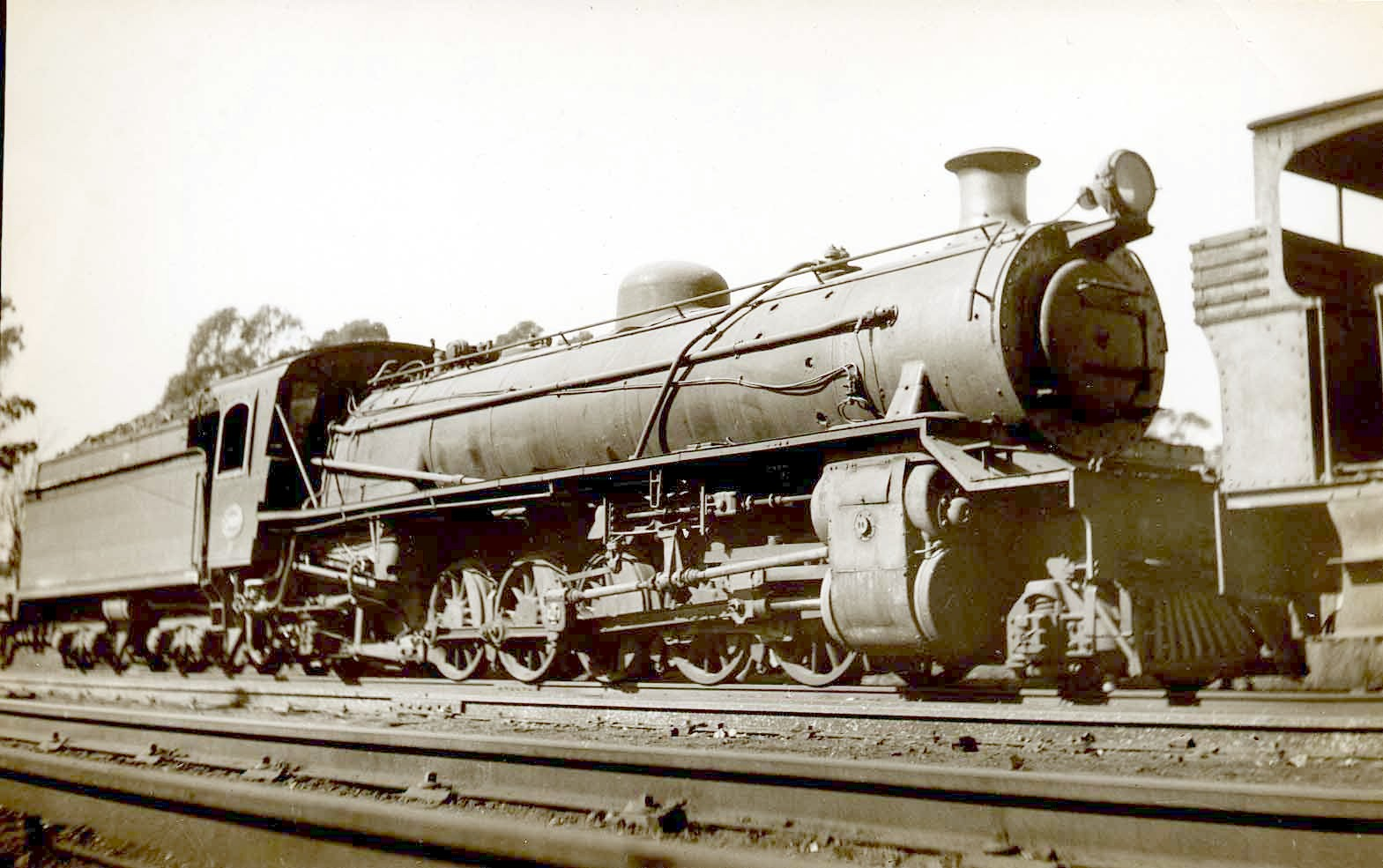
No. 2485 with Type MP1 tender, c. 1935

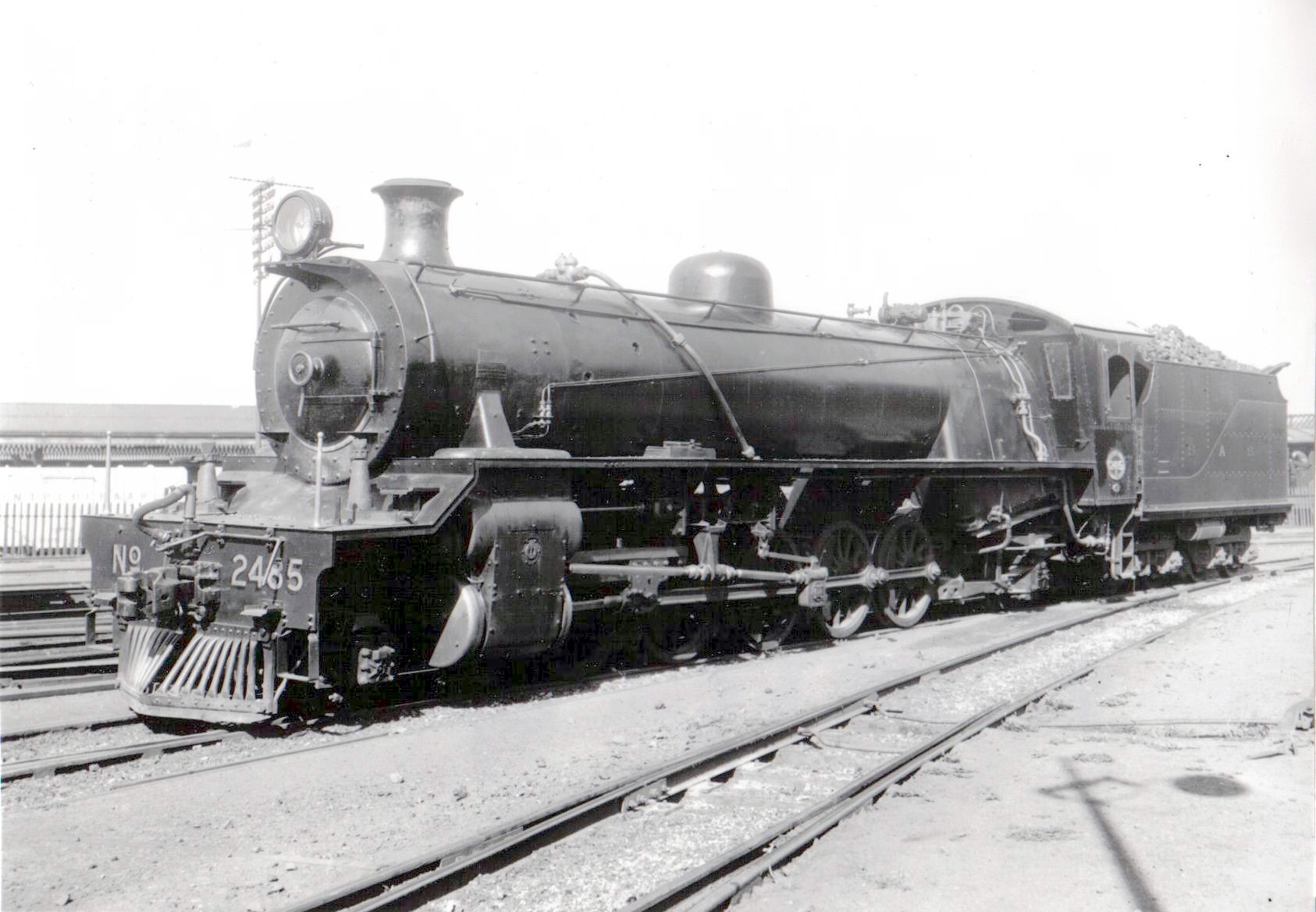
No. 2485 with Type MT2 tender, c. 1945
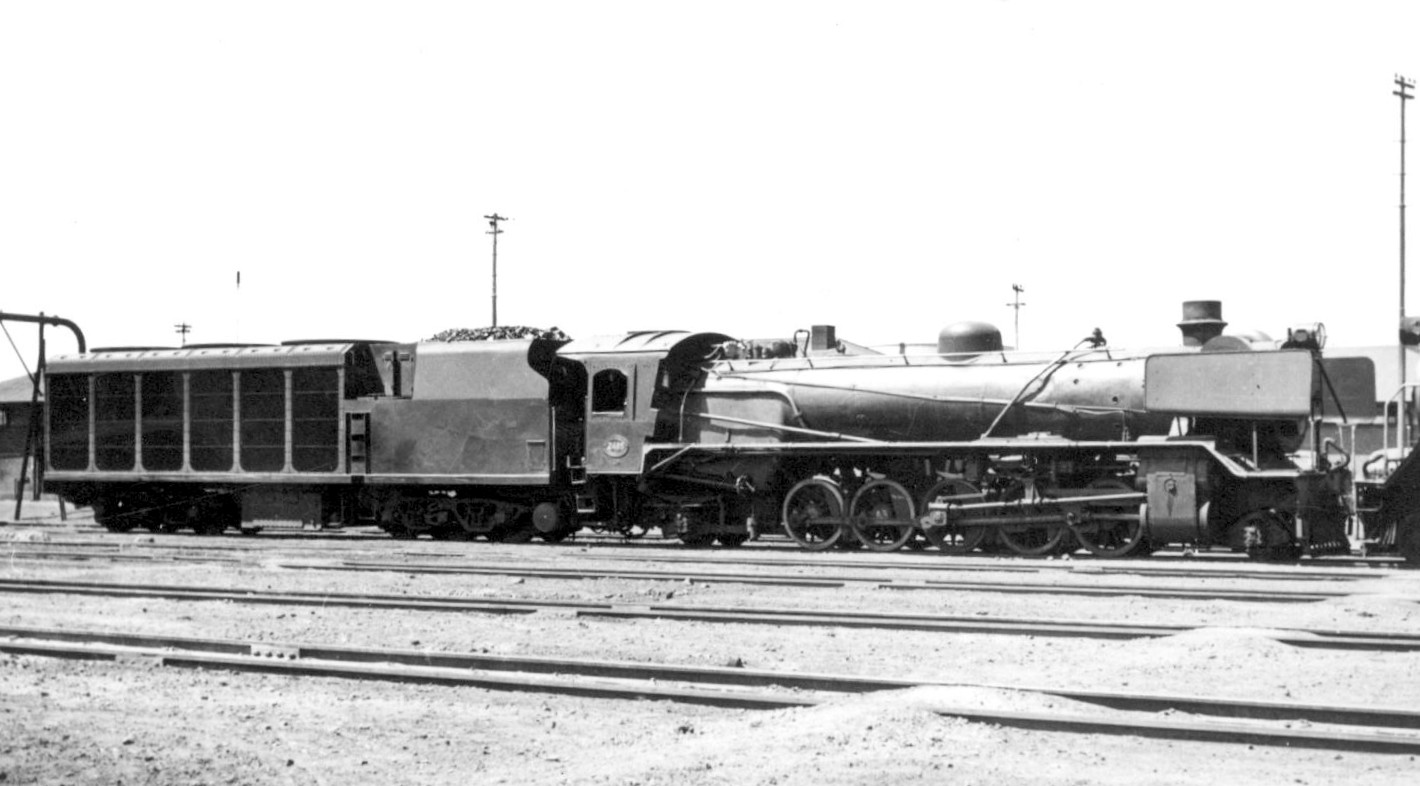
No. 2485 as experimental condensing locomotive with Type CL tender, c. 1950
