= M1920 =

Under the old Model-year nomenclature system many different pieces of equipment had the same Model number.

- 16-inch howitzer M1920
- 14-inch M1920 railway gun
- 4.7 inch Gun M1920 on Carriage M1920

== See also ==
- M1918 (disambiguation)
