= South African type EW2 tender =

Steam locomotive tender in South Africa

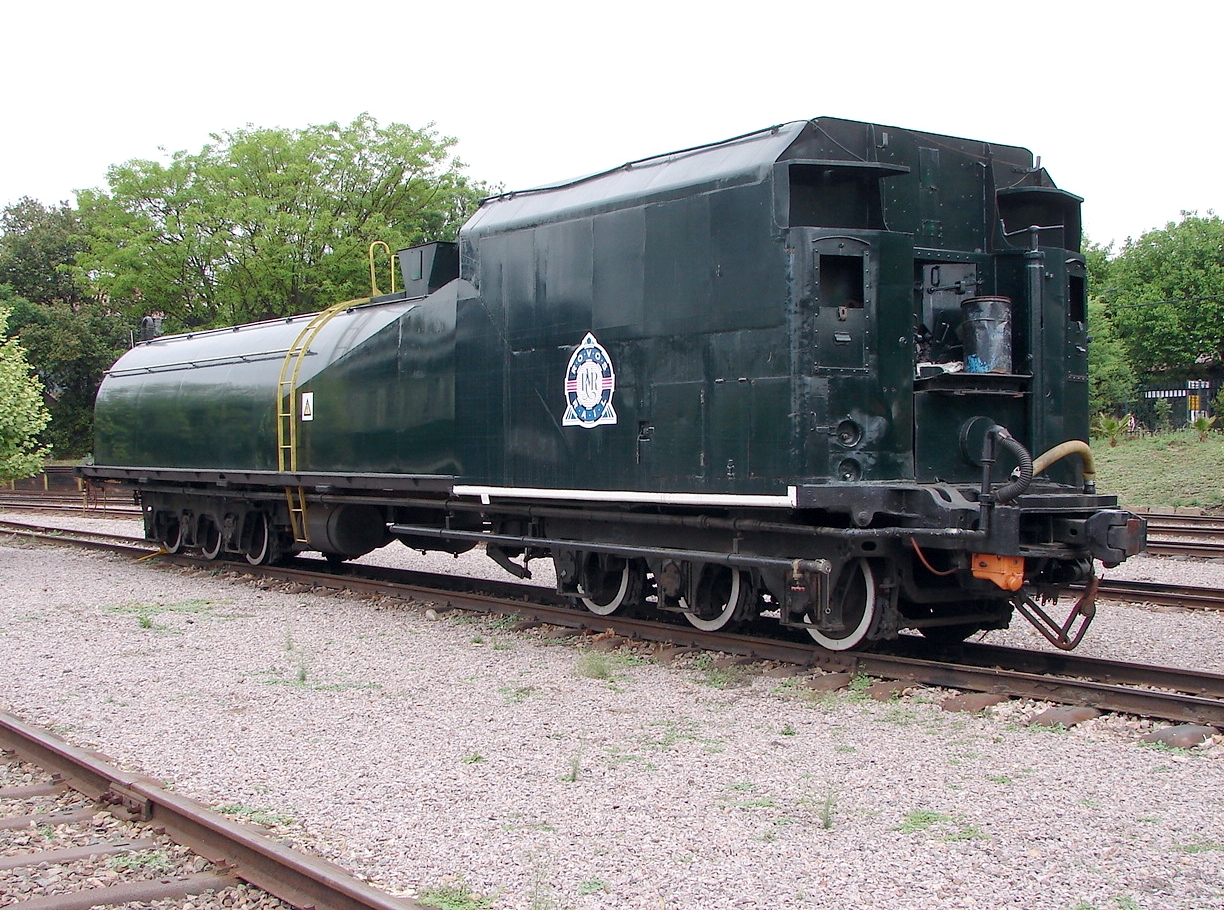
- Type EW2 tender no. 3480, 5 October 2009
Type and origin
- Locomotive: Class 25NC
- Designer: South African Railways
- Builder: South African Railways
- In service: 1973-1980
- Rebuilt from: Type CZ
- Rebuild date: 1973-1980
Specifications
- Configuration: 3-axle bogies
- Gauge: 3 ft 6 in (1,067 mm) Cape gauge
- Wheel dia.: 34 in (864 mm)
- Wheelbase: 45 ft 10 in (13,970 mm)
  - Bogie: 10 ft (3,048 mm)
- Fuel type: Coal
- Fuel cap.: 19 LT (19.3 t)
- Water cap.: 11,200 imp gal (50,900 L)
- Stoking: Mechanical
- Couplers: Drawbar & AAR knuckle
Career
- Operators: South African Railways
- Numbers: SAR 3452-3479, 3481-3510, 3512-3539
- Nicknames: Worshond

The South African type EW2 tender was a steam locomotive tender.

Type EW2 tenders were rebuilt from Type CZ tenders which had entered service between 1953 and 1955 as steam condensing tenders to the Class 25 4-8-4 Northern type condensing steam locomotives. The tenders were stripped of their condensing equipment and fitted with huge water tanks when their engines were modified to Class 25NC non-condensing locomotives between 1973 and 1980.

== Origin ==
Altogether 90 Type CZ steam condensing tenders were built in 1953 by Henschel and Son and North British Locomotive Company as tenders to the Class 25 condensing steam locomotives. In 1963 one more was built by the South African Railways (SAR). The design work on the locomotive's condensing apparatus and the Type CZ condensing tender was carried out by Henschel, who held the patent.

== Rebuilding ==
The Class 25 was a complex locomotive which required high maintenance, especially on the turbine blower fans in the smokebox, of which the blades needed to be replaced frequently due to damage by solid particles in the exhaust. The equally complex condensing tender also required frequent maintenance.

Between 1973 and 1980, after serving for twenty years and partially accelerated by the introduction of electric and diesel-electric traction over routes which were previously served exclusively by the Class 25, all but three of the Class 25 condensing locomotives, numbers 3451, 3511 and 3540, were converted to free-exhausting and non-condensing locomotives and reclassified to Class 25NC. Their Type CZ condensing tenders were rebuilt to regular coal and water tenders. Since these tenders often migrated between engines during overhauls, the fleet numbers as shown are those of the rebuilt engines and are not necessarily correct for the tenders.

The first conversion was done at Beaconsfield on no. 3452. The tender was stripped of its condensing equipment, but retained its original fresh water and condensate tanks and feed pumps, with the result that the boiler would now be fed with cold water, apparently with none of the ill effects which had been predicted earlier. The radiator framing and roof were panelled over. The locomotive's general appearance therefore changed little, but while the conversion of its tender was aesthetically superior when compared with subsequent conversions, it did not carry enough water.

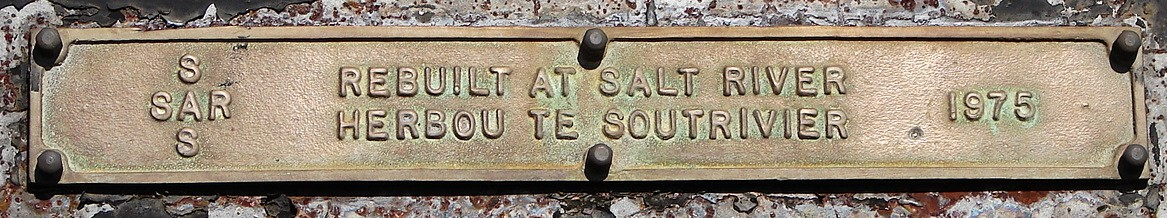
Salt River Shops rebuild plate

The rest of the fleet was rebuilt at the Salt River shops in Cape Town at a rate of about fifteen per year. On these tenders, the condensing radiators and roof fans were removed and replaced with a massive round-topped water tank. The shape and appearance of the converted tender was dictated by strength rather than aesthetic considerations. It was considered to shorten the tender's cast water-bottom frame, but it was eventually retained as it was. To replicate the Class 25NC's Type EW1 tender tank and bunker on the much longer Type CZ water-bottom frame would have exceeded the permissible axle loading by a considerable amount.

The long cast steel frame of the tender was very flexible, but the radiator framing and roof had contributed a great deal to the vertical stiffness. The final form of the tender tank supplied enough strength, with its semi-circular top welded to the original fresh water tank via the fan supports and the long triangular gussets set into the bunker sides which extended past the midpoint of the frame. Locomotives with these rebuilt tenders were soon nicknamed Worshond, Afrikaans for dachshund and literally translated as sausage dog. The Worshond tenders were designated Type EW2.

== Characteristics ==
The Type EW2 tender rode on three-axle bogies with roller bearings and was as long as the engine itself. The brake riggings of its bogies were independent of each other and only the front bogie was equipped with a hand brake. Almost one-third of the total length of the tender was taken up by the coal bunker, with a capacity of 19 long tons (19.3 tonnes), while the D-shaped tank had a water capacity of 11,200 imperial gallons (50,900 litres). The mechanical stoker equipment had a maximum delivery rate of 12,000 pounds (5,443 kilograms) of coal per hour.

== Classification letters ==
Since many tender types are interchangeable between different locomotive classes and types, a tender classification system was adopted by the SAR. The first letter of the tender type indicates the classes of engines to which it can be coupled. The "E_" tenders were arranged with mechanical stokers and could be used with the locomotive classes as shown.

- Class 15F, if equipped with a mechanical stoker.
- Class 23.
- Class 25NC.
- Class 26.

The second letter indicates the tender's water capacity. The "_W2" tenders had a capacity of 11,200 imperial gallons (50,900 litres; 13,500 US gallons).

A number, when added after the letter code, indicates differences between similar tender types, such as function, wheelbase or coal bunker capacity.

== Illustration ==
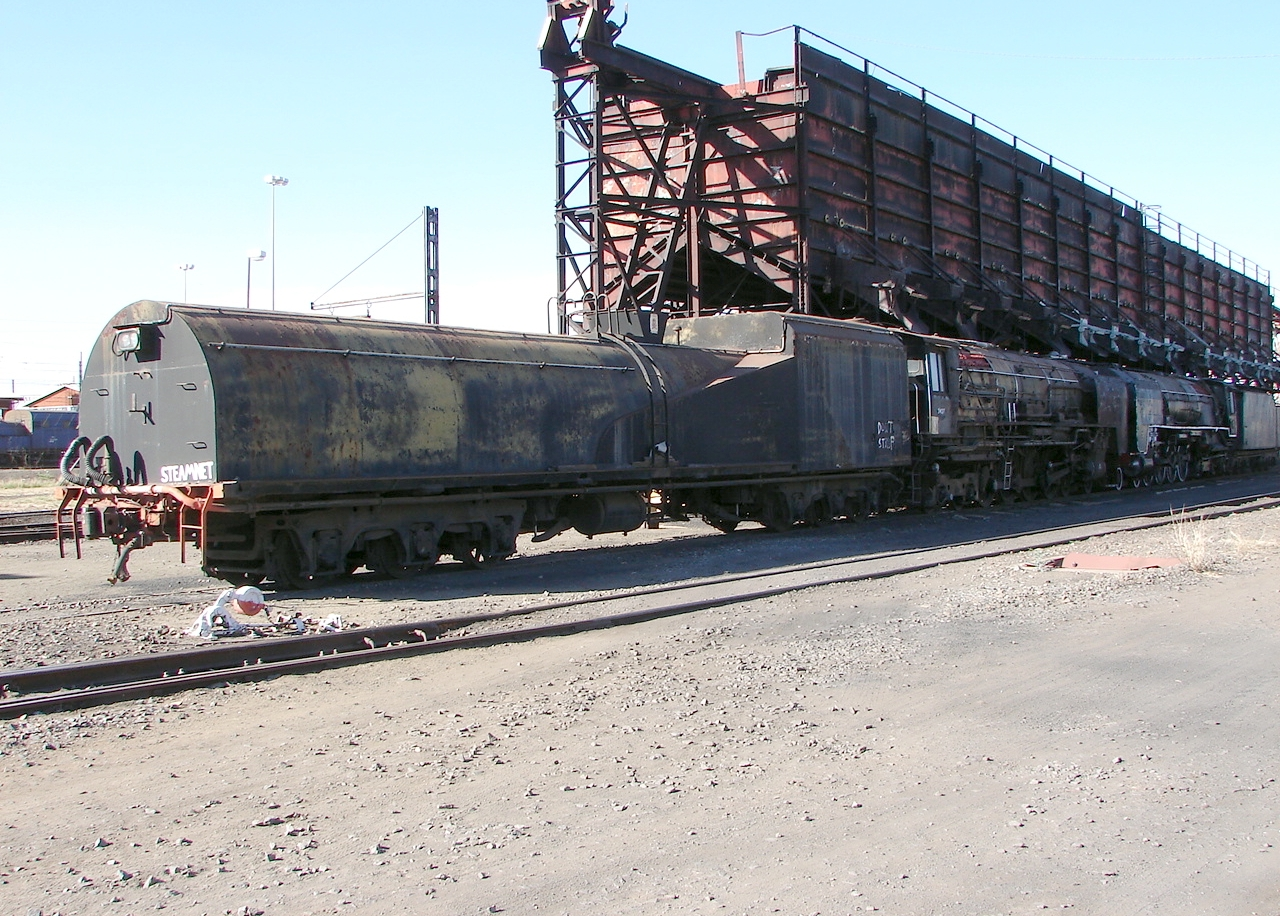
Type EW2 Worshond on Class 25NC, 17 September 2009

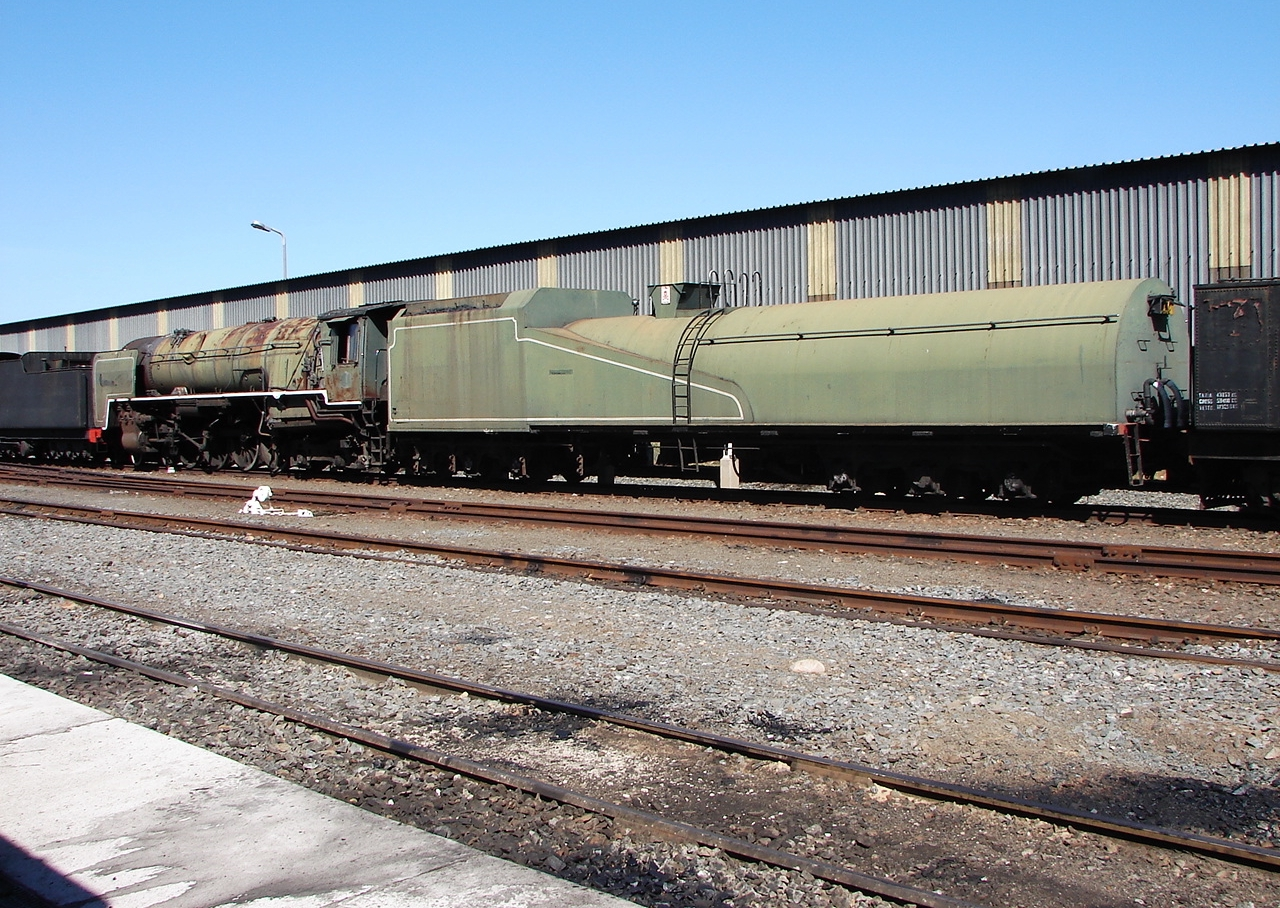
Type EW2 Worshond on Class 25NC, 20 October 2009
