= South African type CZ tender =

Type of rail vehicle

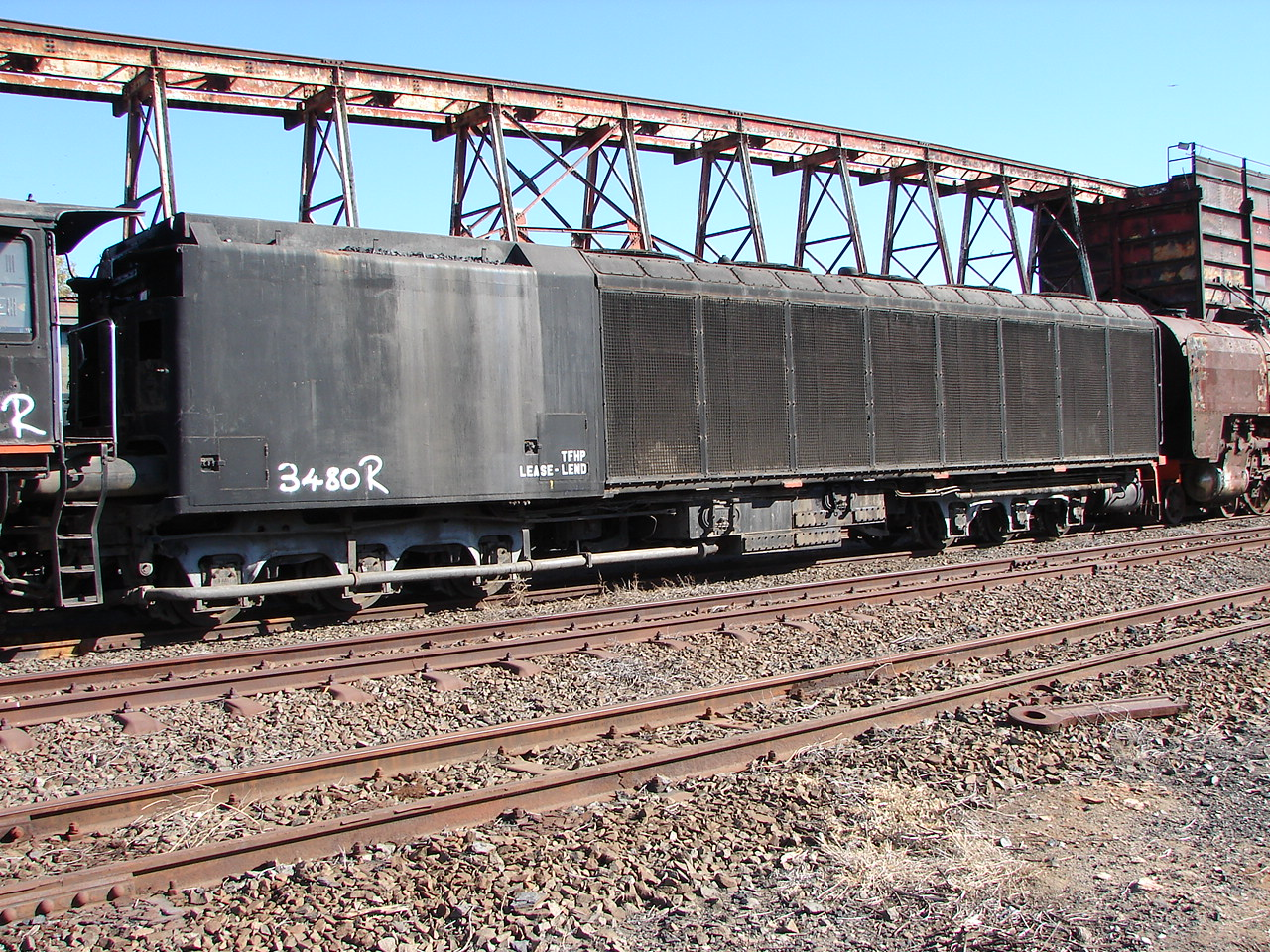
- Type CZ tender no. 3480, 17 September 2009
Type and origin
- Locomotive: Class 25
- Designer: Henschel and Son
- Builder: Henschel and Son; North British Locomotive Company; South African Railways
- Works no.: Henschel 23780, 28780-28839, NBL 27372-27400, SAR 3541
- In service: 1953-1954, 1963
- Rebuilder: South African Railways
- Rebuild date: 1973-1980
- Rebuilt to: Type EW2
Specifications
- Configuration: 3-axle bogies
- Gauge: 3 ft 6 in (1,067 mm) Cape gauge
- Wheel dia.: 34 in (864 mm)
- Wheelbase: 45 ft 10 in (13,970 mm)
  - Bogie: 10 ft (3,048 mm)
- Axle load: 19 LT 1 cwt 2 qtr (19,380 kg)
  - Front bogie: 57 LT 4 cwt (58,120 kg)
  - Rear bogie: 56 LT 14 cwt (57,610 kg)
- Weight empty: 158,339 lb (71,821 kg)
- Weight w/o: 113 LT 18 cwt (115,700 kg)
- Fuel type: Coal
- Fuel cap.: 19 LT (19.3 t)
- Water cap.: 4,400 imp gal (20,000 L) main tank 600 imp gal (2,730 L) condensate
- Stoking: Mechanical
- Couplers: Drawbar & AAR knuckle
Career
- Operators: South African Railways
- Numbers: SAR 3451-3541

The South African type CZ tender was a condensing steam locomotive tender.

Type CZ tenders entered service between 1953 and 1955, as tenders to the Class 25 4-8-4 Northern type condensing steam locomotives which entered service on the South African Railways in those years. One more tender was built by the Railways in 1963.

== Manufacturers ==
Altogether 91 Type CZ tenders were built in 1953 and 1963 by Henschel and Son, North British Locomotive Company (NBL) and the South African Railways (SAR).

Between 1953 and 1955, the SAR placed ninety Class 25 condensing steam locomotives in service, designed under the direction of L.C. Grubb, Chief Mechanical Engineer of the SAR from 1949 to 1954.

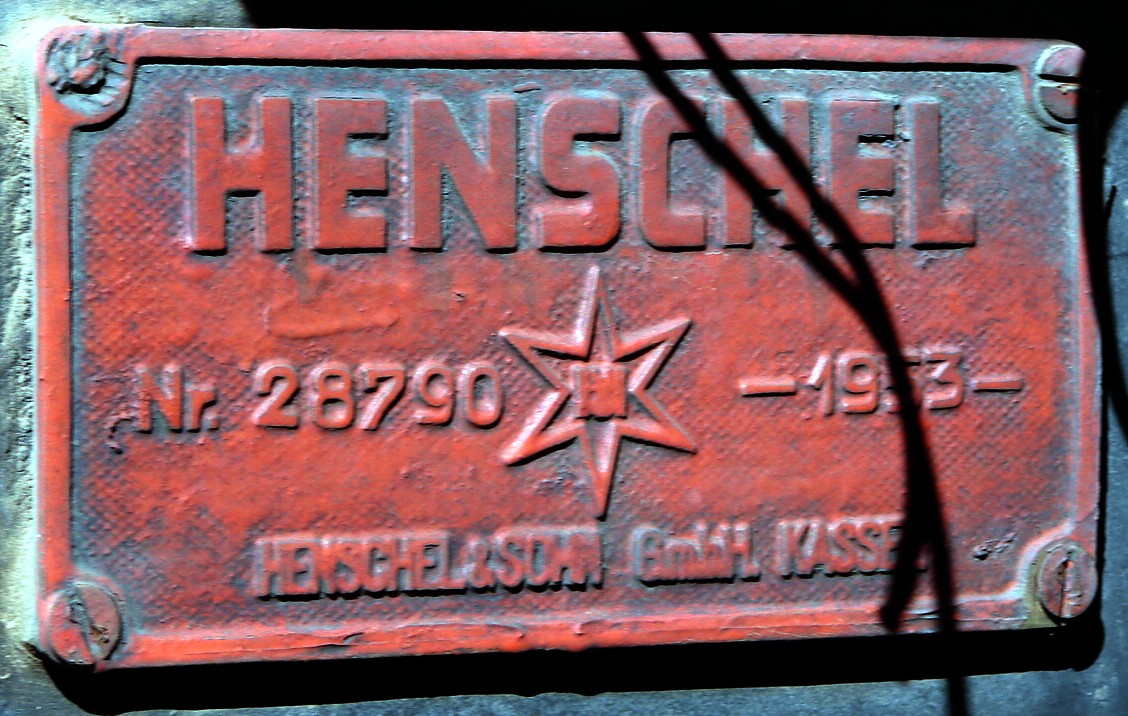
Tender works plate

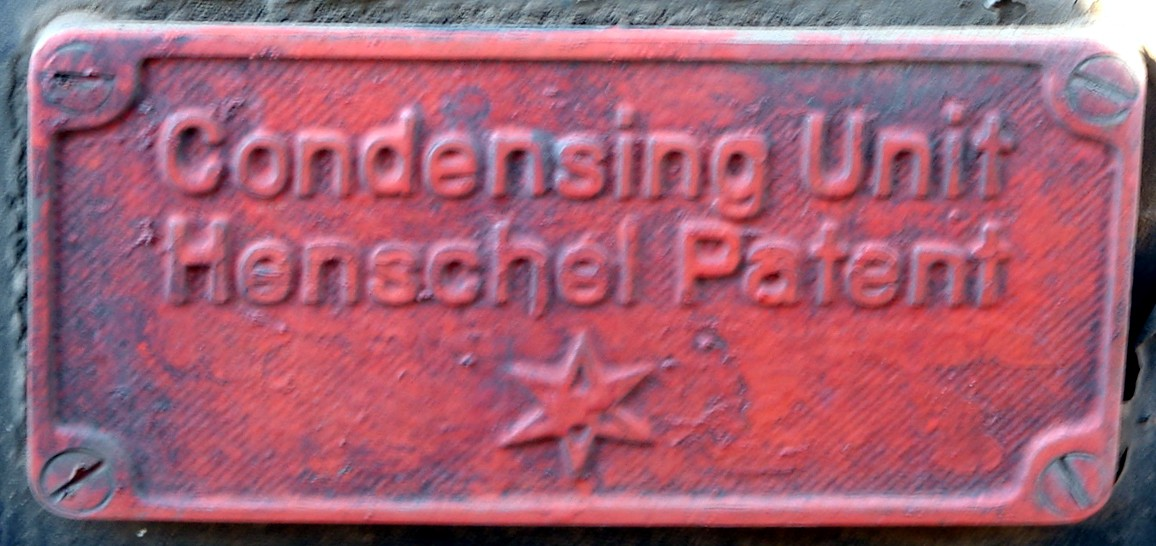
Henschel patent plate

The design work on the locomotive's condensing apparatus and the Type CZ condensing tender was carried out by Henschel, who built one locomotive complete with tender, no. 3451 with works number 28730. This locomotive was then dispatched to NBL in Glasgow, who built the rest of the Class 25 locomotives, numbered in the range from 3452 to 3540. They were delivered between 1953 and 1955.

Apart from the first engine and tender, another 60 tenders were built by Henschel, who held the patent, with works numbers in the range from 28780 to 28839. Another 29 tenders were built by NBL, who also built 89 of the 90 engines. The works numbers of these NBL-built tenders probably corresponded with the works numbers of the last 29 engines, in the range from 27372 to 27400, but this cannot be verified. One more tender was built by the SAR at its Salt River shops in 1963, on a spare cast water-bottom frame which had been delivered as part of the original order in 1953.

== Characteristics ==
On the Class 25 condensing locomotive, spent steam was fed through a thick pipe on the engine's left side back to the tender, to be condensed back to water for repeated use. The Type CZ tender was built on a one-piece cast-steel water-bottom frame, supplied by General Steel Castings in the United States of America, and rode on three-axle bogies with Timken roller bearings. It had four 21 inches (533 millimetres) diameter vacuum brake cylinders and the brake riggings of its bogies were independent of each other. Only the front bogie was equipped with a hand brake.

The tender was as long as the engine itself. Almost one-third of the total length of the condensing tender was taken up by the coal bunker, with a capacity of 19 long tons (19.3 tonnes). This part of the tender included the oil separator equipment to remove any oil from the spent steam and the mechanical stoker equipment which had a maximum delivery rate of 12,000 pounds (5,443 kilograms) of coal per hour.

The rear two-thirds of the tender's length was taken up by the water tanks and eight large radiators on each side, cooled by five exhaust steam-driven roof-mounted fans which drew air from outside through the radiators. The 5,000 imperial gallons (22,700 litres) water capacity consisted of two tanks, a 4,400 imperial gallons (20,000 litres) fresh water tank in the centre of the tender between the radiators and a 600 imperial gallons (2,730 litres) condensate tank under the tender belly between the bogies. Feedwater for the engine's boiler was taken directly from the condensate tank's hot contents rather than from the main tank's cold contents.

The water level in the condensate tank was controlled by a float valve which opened to replenish it from the fresh water tank as soon as the water level dropped to below 400 imperial gallons (1,820 litres) and automatically closed again as soon as that level was reached again. To provide for any malfunction in the water supply, a hand-operated stop cock was provided on the fresh water tank.

The condensing system proved to be extremely efficient and reduced water consumption by as much as 90% by using the same water up to eight times over. This gave the Class 25 locomotive a range of 800 kilometres (500 miles) between water refills. In addition, the hot condensate feedwater resulted in a significantly reduced coal consumption.

The condensing tenders were rather appropriately classified as Type CZ, since CZ is also the motor vehicle registration letters of Beaufort West, the capital town of the Karoo where the Class 25 was to serve.

== Locomotive ==
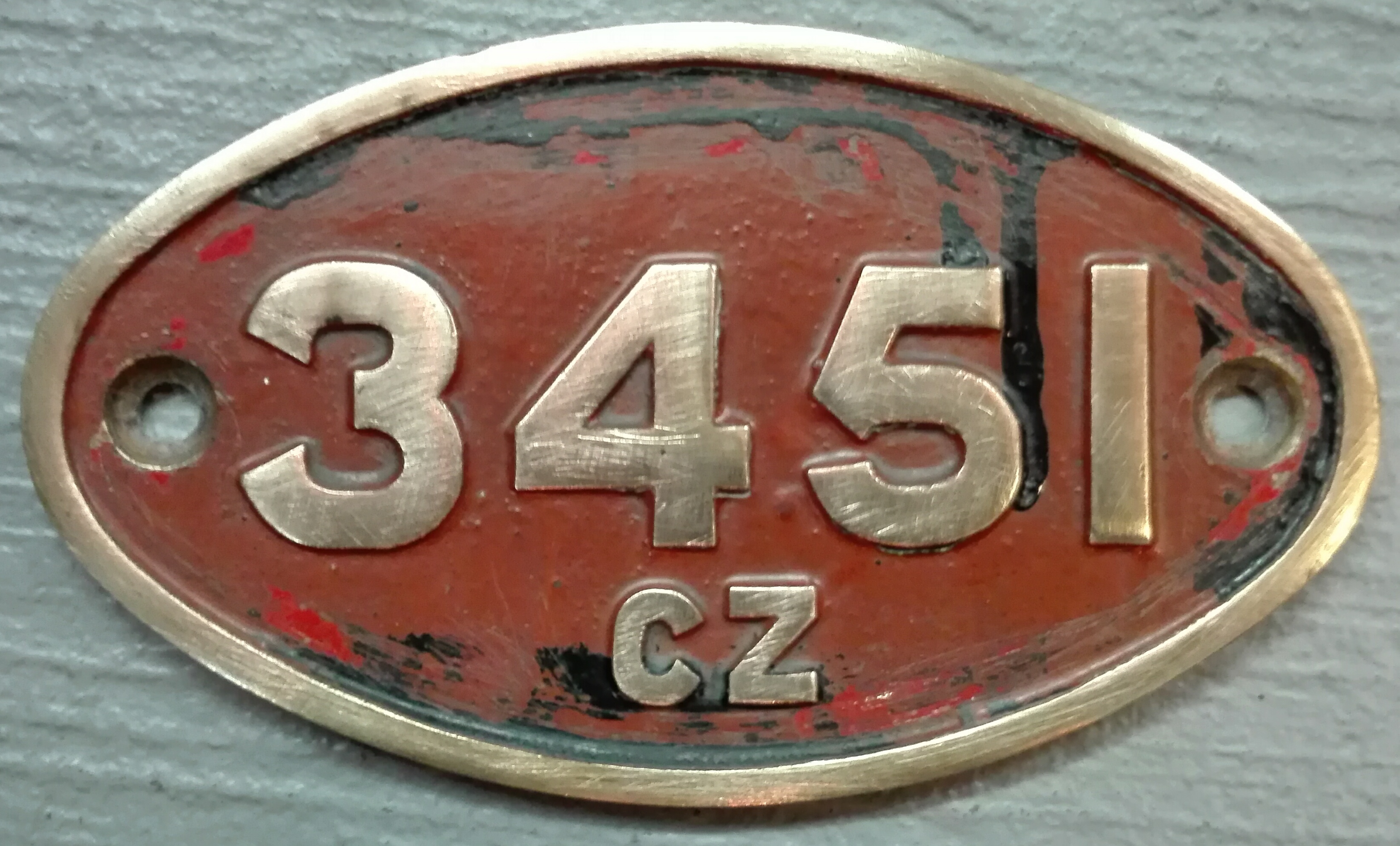

Only the Class 25 locomotives were delivered with Type CZ tenders, which were numbered in the range from 3451 to 3540 for their engines. An oval number plate, bearing the engine number and tender type, was attached to the rear end of the tenders. The additional tender, built by the SAR at its Salt River shops in 1963, was numbered 3541.

== Classification letters ==
Since many tender types are interchangeable between different locomotive classes and types, a tender classification system was adopted by the SAR. The first letter of the tender type indicates the classes of engines to which it can be coupled. The two "C_" tender types were condensing tenders and could only be used with the specific locomotive class for which each was designed.

- Type CL tender on the Class 20.
- Type CZ tender on the Class 25.

The second letter indicates the tender's water capacity. The "_Z" tenders had a capacity of 5,000 imperial gallons (22,700 litres; 6,000 US gallons).

== Rebuilding ==
Between 1973 and 1980, after serving for twenty years and partially accelerated by the introduction of electric and diesel-electric traction over routes which were previously served exclusively by the Class 25, all but three of the Class 25 condensing locomotives, numbers 3451, 3511 and 3540, were converted to free-exhausting and non-condensing locomotives as they went through the workshops for major overhauls. The converted locomotives were reclassified to Class 25NC.

The tender of the first locomotive to be converted to Class 25NC at Beaconsfield, no. 3452, was stripped of its condensing equipment, but retained its original fresh water and condensate tanks and feed pumps with the result that the boiler would now be fed with cold water, apparently with none of the ill effects which had been predicted earlier. The radiator framing and roof were panelled over. Its general appearance therefore changed little but, while the conversion of its tender was aesthetically superior when compared with subsequent conversions, it did not carry enough water.

The rest of the fleet was rebuilt at the Salt River shops in Cape Town at a rate of about fifteen per year. There, the condensing tenders were rebuilt to ordinary coal-and-water tenders by removing the condensing radiators and roof fans and replacing it with a massive round-topped water tank. These tenders were reclassified as Type EW2 and nicknamed Worshond tenders.

== Illustration ==
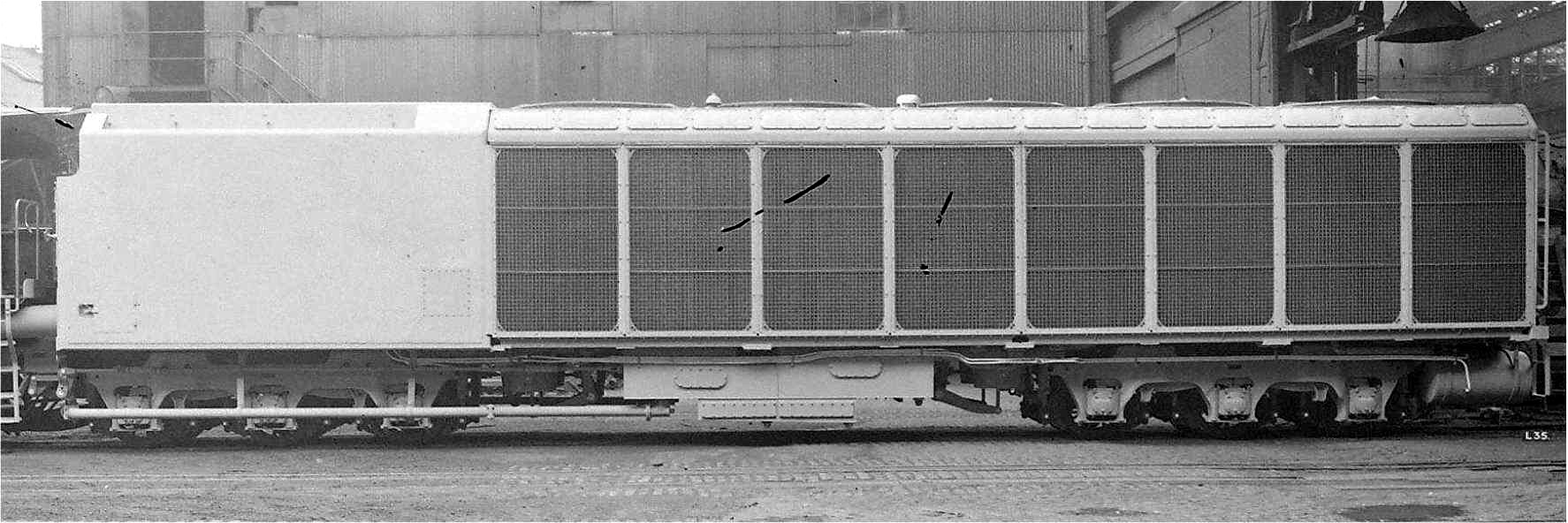
Type CZ condensing tender works picture, c. 1953

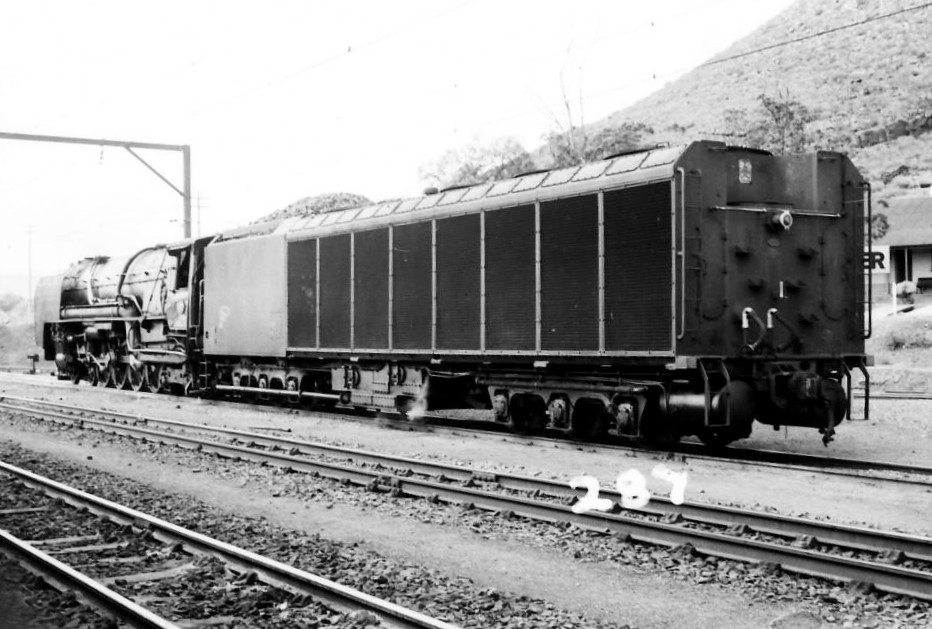
Class 25 and Type CZ condensing tender, c. 1970

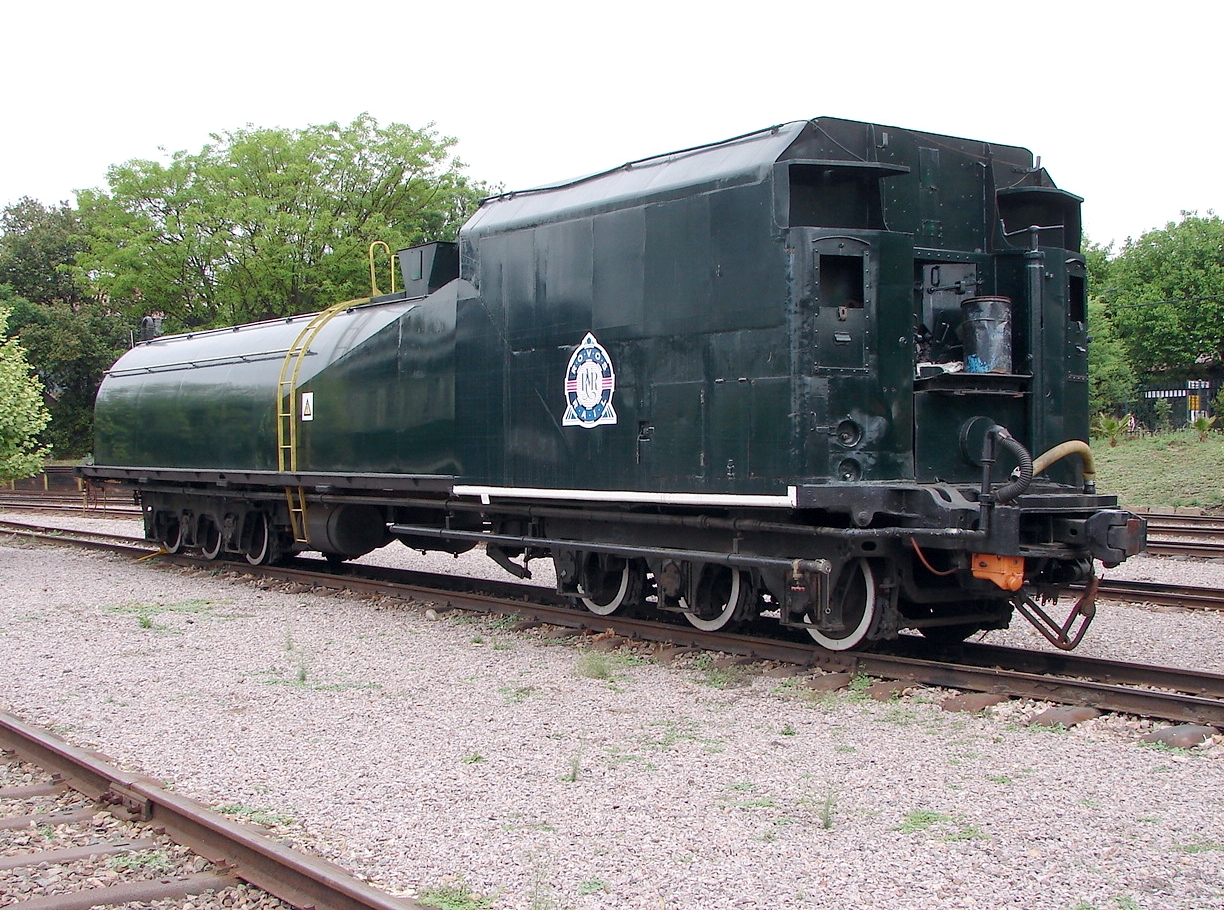
Type EW2 Worshond tender
