= Rovos Rail =

Private South African railway company

Coordinates: 25.7176°S 28.1906°E

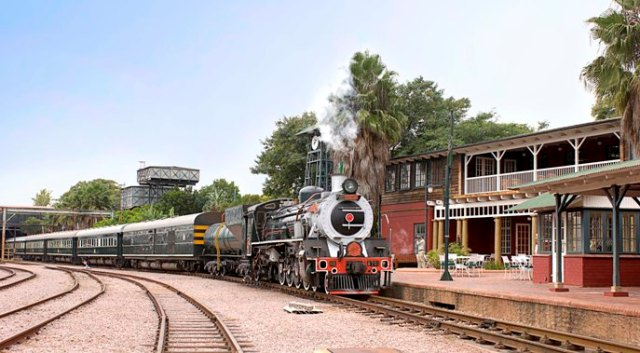
- Train about to depart from Capital Park Station
- Main routes: Cape Town to Dar es Salaam; Pretoria to Swakopmund; Pretoria to Cape Town; Pretoria to Durban; Pretoria to Victoria Falls

Other
- Website: rovos.com

Rovos Rail is a private railway company operating out of Capital Park Station in Pretoria, South Africa.

Rovos Rail runs its train-hotel to a regular schedule on various routes throughout Southern Africa, from South Africa to Namibia and Tanzania. The trains consist of restored National Railways of Zimbabwe (NRZ) coaches with two lounges, two restaurant cars, and private sleeping compartments, each with private ensuite facilities.

The train has three types of accommodation on board, the smallest being a Pullman, at 76 square feet; the largest being the Royal Suite, which is half a train car, and 172 square feet. All types of cabins have ensuite shower, sink, and toilet. The Royal Suite also has a Victorian-style bathtub.

The company was started in 1989 by Rohan Vos and is still family owned. Rovos Rail employs a staff of over 430, from the on-board staff to those working to restore carriages in the company's Capital Park depot.

== Routes ==
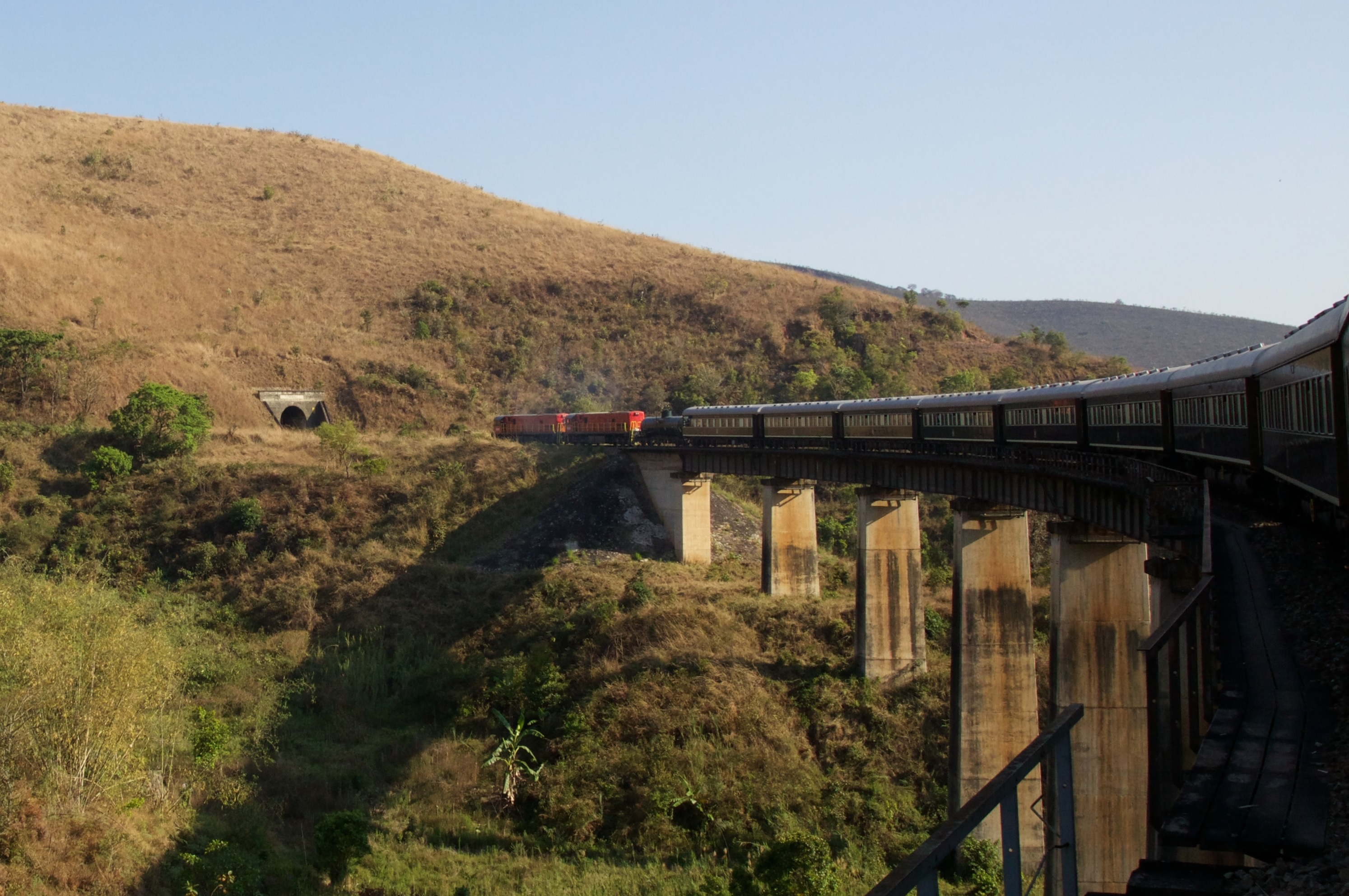
Entering a tunnel on the TAZARA line in southern Tanzania

Rovos Rail operates the following routes:

- Cape Town Journey (3 Nights * 1600km) - Pretoria to Cape Town or vice versa
- Durban Journey (2 Nights * 800km) - Pretoria to Durban or vice versa
- Victoria Falls Journey (3/4 Nights * 1400km) - Pretoria to Victoria Falls or vice versa
- Golf Safari Journey (9 Nights * 2100km)
- Namibia Safari Journey (11 Nights * 3400km) - Pretoria to Walvis Bay or vice versa
- African Collage Journey (12 Nights * 3700km) - Pretoria to Cape Town or vice versa
- Southern Cross Journey (11 Nights * 2500km) - Pretoria to Victoria Falls or vice versa
- African Trilogy Journey (15 Nights * 5000km) - Pretoria to Walvis Bay
- Dar es Salaam Journey (15 Nights * 5530km) - Cape Town to Dar es Salaam or vice versa
- Copper Trail (14 Nights * 3100km) - Victoria Falls to Lobito or vice versa
- Malawi Meander (16 Nights * 3600km) - Pretoria to Lilongwe or vice versa

== Steam locomotives ==
Rovos Rail owns 7 steam locomotives purchased between 1987 and 2007. The oldest steam locomotive was built by Dübs & Company in Glasgow in 1893. It is a Class 6 locomotive which Rovos Rail named 439 Tiffany (after the youngest daughter of Rohan Vos). The remaining locomotives are Class 19Ds and Class 25NCs built by Borsig Lokomotiv Werke, Henschel & Son and North British Locomotive Company. 2701 Brenda, 2702 Bianca and 3360 Shaun, named after the other three children, are Class 19D locomotives built during the 1930s. All three were saved from scrap metal dealers and, after extensive restoration, were put back into service in 1989. Locomotive 3484 Marjorie – named after Rohan's mother – is a Class 25NC locomotive built in 1954 by North British in Glasgow. Due to the difficulties in running steam over long distances the decision was made to convert this locomotive from a coal to a more efficient oil-fired engine. A further two Class 25NC locomotives have been restored and added to the fleet: 3442 Anthea, built in 1953 by Henschel & Son of Germany, is named after Rohan's wife; 3533 King Zog is named after Rohan's late Dalmatian.

== Derailments ==
A Rovos Rail train derailed on 21 April 2010 near Pretoria. Three people were killed and several passengers were injured. The owner of Rovos Rail said that the train's nineteen carriages were uncoupled from the locomotive during a changeover at Centurion Station when they freewheeled out of control, crashing back at Pretoria station. Approximately half of the 55 passengers were on board along with some of the thirty staff.

On 1 March 2026, another Rovos Rail train derailed near Keetmanshoop in Namibia, killing two persons.

== Gallery ==
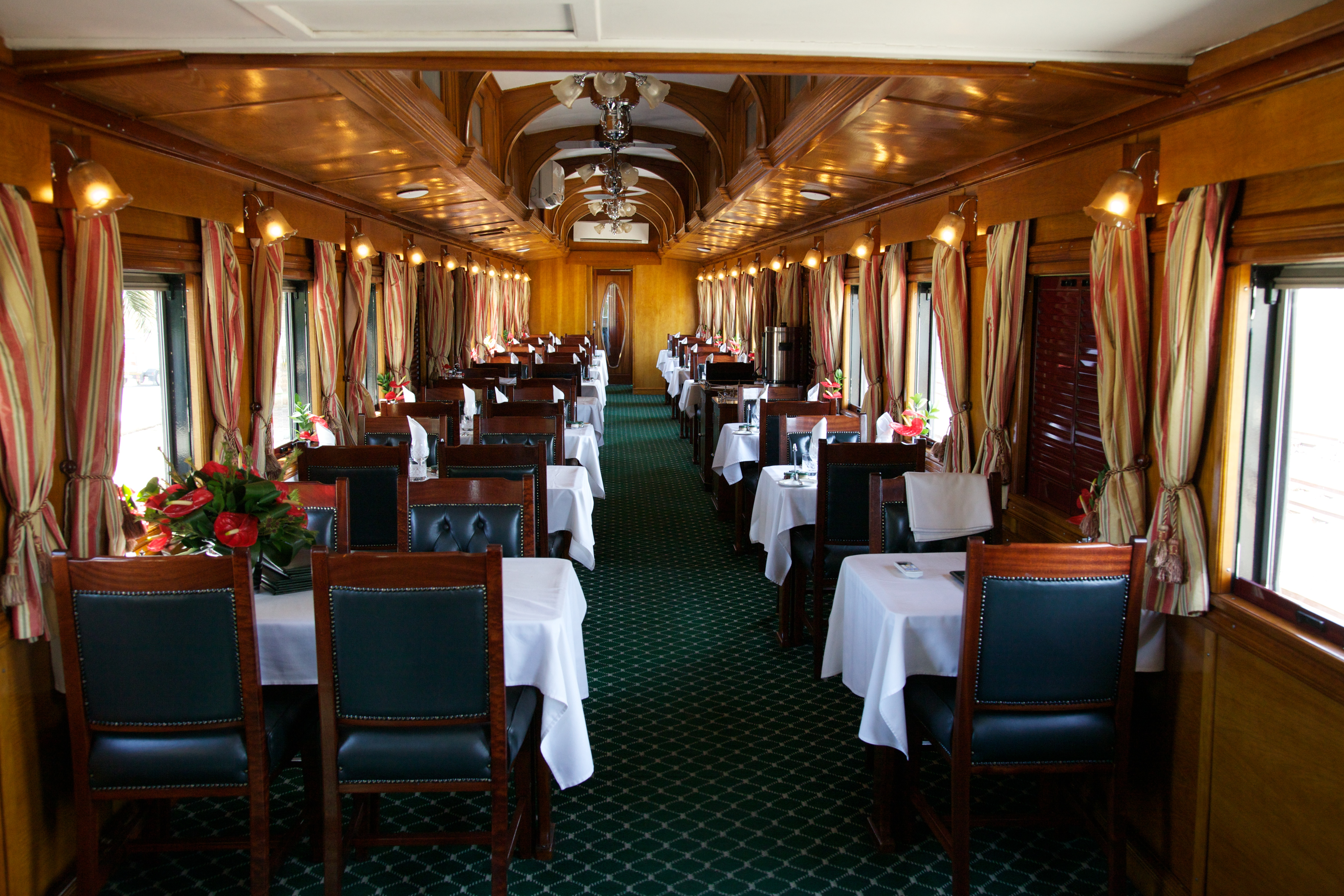
Dining Car

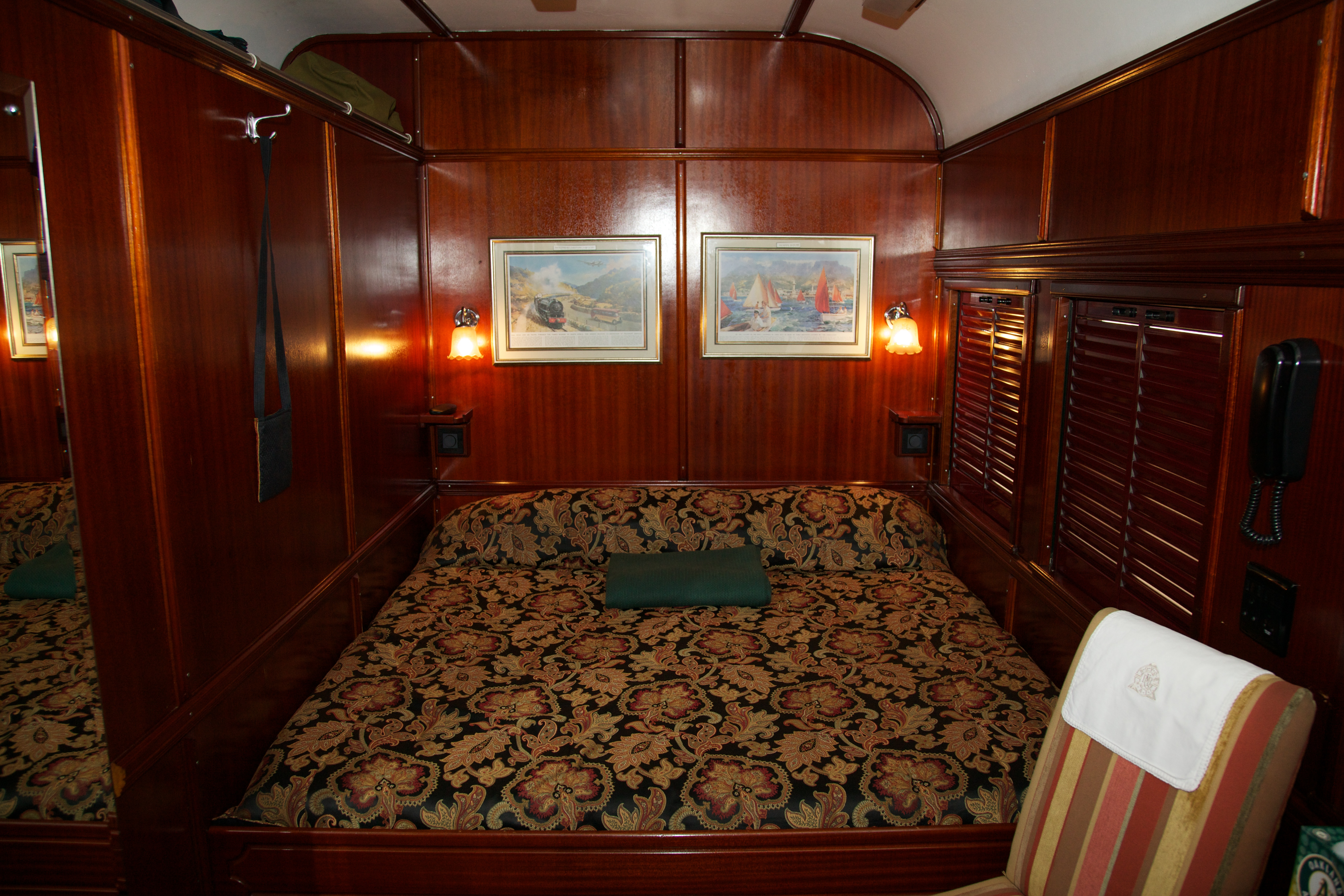
Deluxe Suite

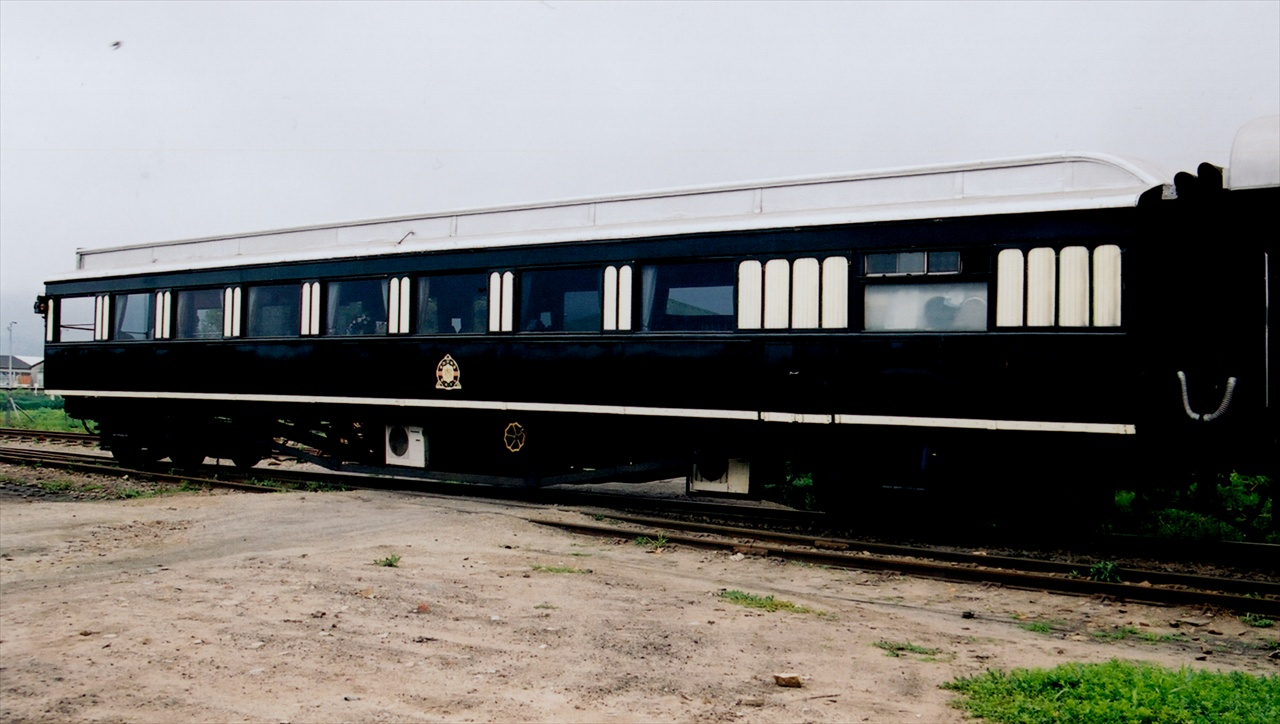
Observation car

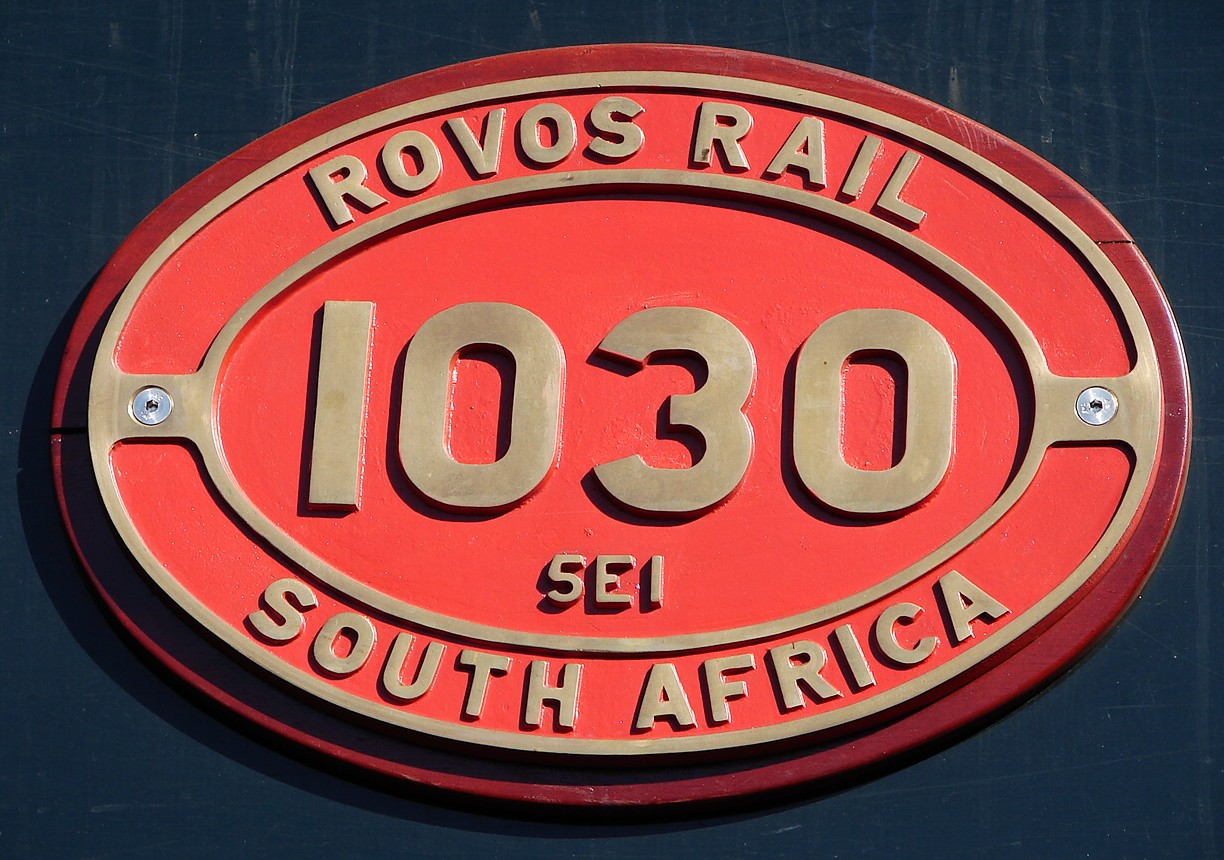
Number plate
