= South African Class 25NC 4-8-4 =

1953 design of steam locomotive

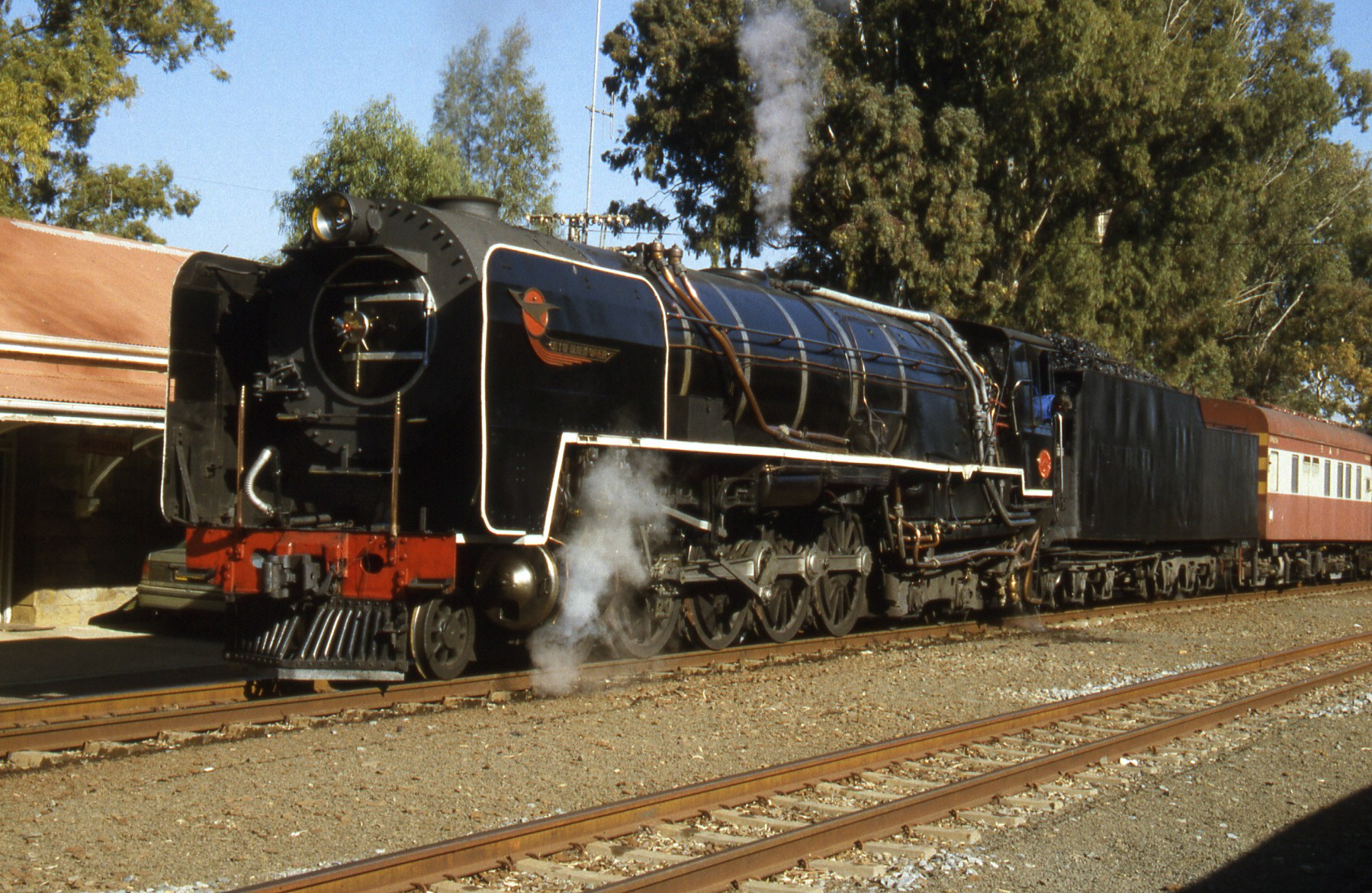
- 3410 at Sannaspos Free State in July 1999
Type and origin
- ♠ Type EW1 tender – ♥ Type EW2 tender
- Power type: Steam
- Designer: South African Railways (LC Grubb)
- Builder: Henschel & Son; North British Locomotive Company
- Serial number: Henschel 28731-28769; NBL 27287-27296, 27311
- Model: Class 25NC
- Build date: 1953
- Total produced: 137
Specifications
- Configuration
  - Whyte: 4-8-4 (Northern)
- Driver: 2nd coupled axle
- Gauge: 3 ft 6 in (1,067 mm) Cape gauge
- Leading dia.: 30 in (762 mm)
- Coupled dia.: 60 in (1,524 mm)
- Trailing dia.: 30 in (762 mm)
- Tender wheels: 34 in (864 mm)
- Minimum curve: 275 ft (84 m)
- Wheelbase: ♠ 81 ft 4 11/16 in (24,808 mm) ♥ 95 ft 1 11/16 in (28,999 mm)
  - Engine: 38 ft (11,582 mm)
  - Leading: 6 ft 10 in (2,083 mm)
  - Coupled: 15 ft 9 in (4,801 mm)
  - Trailing: 5 ft 6 in (1,676 mm)
  - Tender: ♠ 32 ft (9,754 mm) ♥ 45 ft 10 in (13,970 mm)
  - Tender bogie: 10 ft (3,048 mm)
- Length
  - Over couplers: ♠ 91 ft 6 9/16 in (27,903 mm) ♥ 107 ft 6 1/16 in (32,768 mm)
- Height: 13 ft (3,962 mm)
- Frame type: Cast
- Axle load: 18 LT 14 cwt (19,000 kg)
  - Leading: 21 LT 2 cwt (21,440 kg)
  - 1st coupled: 18 LT 10 cwt (18,800 kg)
  - 2nd coupled: 18 LT 14 cwt (19,000 kg)
  - 3rd coupled: 18 LT 12 cwt (18,900 kg)
  - 4th coupled: 18 LT 9 cwt (18,750 kg)
  - Trailing: 22 LT 12 cwt (22,960 kg)
  - Tender bogie: Bogie 1: ♠ 51 LT 6 cwt (52,120 kg); Bogie 2: ♠ 54 LT 5 cwt (55,120 kg)
  - Tender axle: ♠ 18 LT 1 cwt 2 qtr (18,370 kg)
- Adhesive weight: 74 LT 5 cwt (75,440 kg)
- Loco weight: 117 LT 9 cwt (119,300 kg)
- Tender weight: ♠ 105 LT 11 cwt (107,200 kg)
- Total weight: ♠ 223 LT (226,600 kg)
- Tender type: EW1 (3-axle bogies); EW2 (3-axle bogies)
- Fuel type: Coal
- Fuel capacity: ♠ 18 LT (18.3 t) ♥ 19 LT (19.3 t)
- Water cap.: ♠ 10,500 imp gal (47,700 L) ♥ 11,200 imp gal (50,900 L)
- Firebox
  - Type: Round-top
  - Grate area: 70 sq ft (6.5 m^{2})
- Boiler
  - Type: Domeless
  - Pitch: 9 ft 1 5/8 in (2,784 mm)
  - Diameter: 6 ft 4 1/8 in (1,934 mm)
  - Tube plates: 19 ft (5,791 mm)
  - Small tubes: 158: 2 1/2 in (64 mm)
  - Large tubes: 40: 5 1/2 in (140 mm)
- Boiler pressure: 225 psi (1,551 kPa)
- Safety valve: Ross-pop
- Heating surface
  - Firebox: 294 sq ft (27.3 m^{2})
  - Tubes: 3,059 sq ft (284.2 m^{2})
  - Arch tubes: 37 sq ft (3.4 m^{2})
  - Total surface: 3,390 sq ft (315 m^{2})
- Superheater
  - Type: Melesco
  - Heating area: 630 sq ft (59 m^{2})
- Cylinders: Two
- Cylinder size: 24 in × 28 in (610 mm × 711 mm) bore x stroke
- Valve gear: Walschaerts
- Valve type: Piston
- Valve travel: 7 3/8 in (187 mm)
- Loco brake: Vacuum
- Couplers: AAR knuckle
Performance figures
- Tractive effort: 45,360 lbf (201.8 kN) @ 75%
Career
- Operators: South African Railways
- Class: Class 25NC
- Number in class: 50 original, 87 rebuilt Class 25
- Numbers: 3401-3450, 3452-3510, 3512-3539
- Delivered: 1953-1954
- First run: 1953

The South African Railways Class 25NC 4-8-4 of 1953 was a class of steam locomotives built between 1953 and 1955 for the South African Railways (SAR). The Class 25NC was the non-condensing version of the Class 25 condensing locomotive, of which ninety were placed in service at the same time. Between 1973 and 1980, all but three of the condensing locomotives were converted to non-condensing and also designated Class 25NC.

== Manufacturers ==
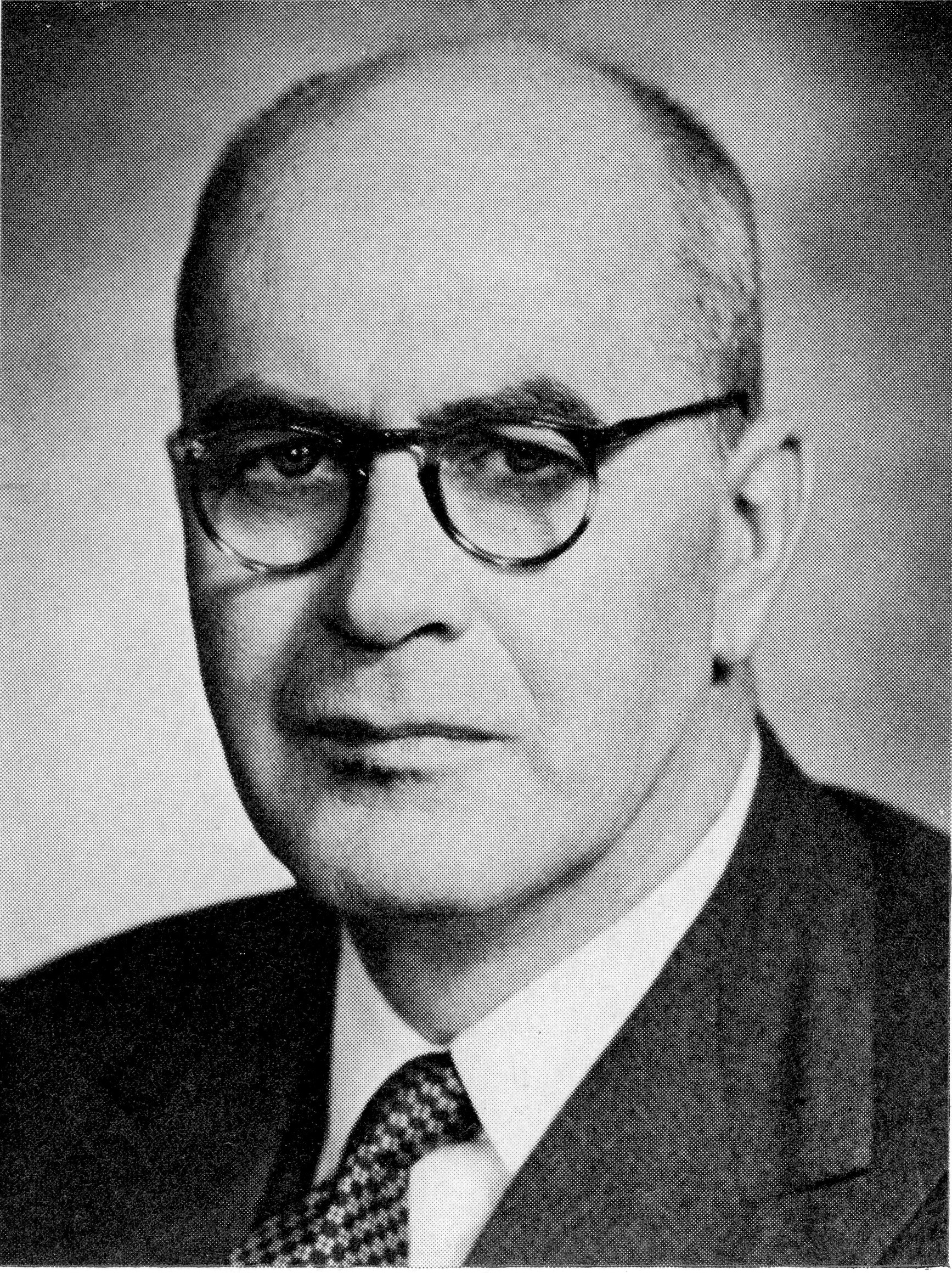
L.C. Grubb

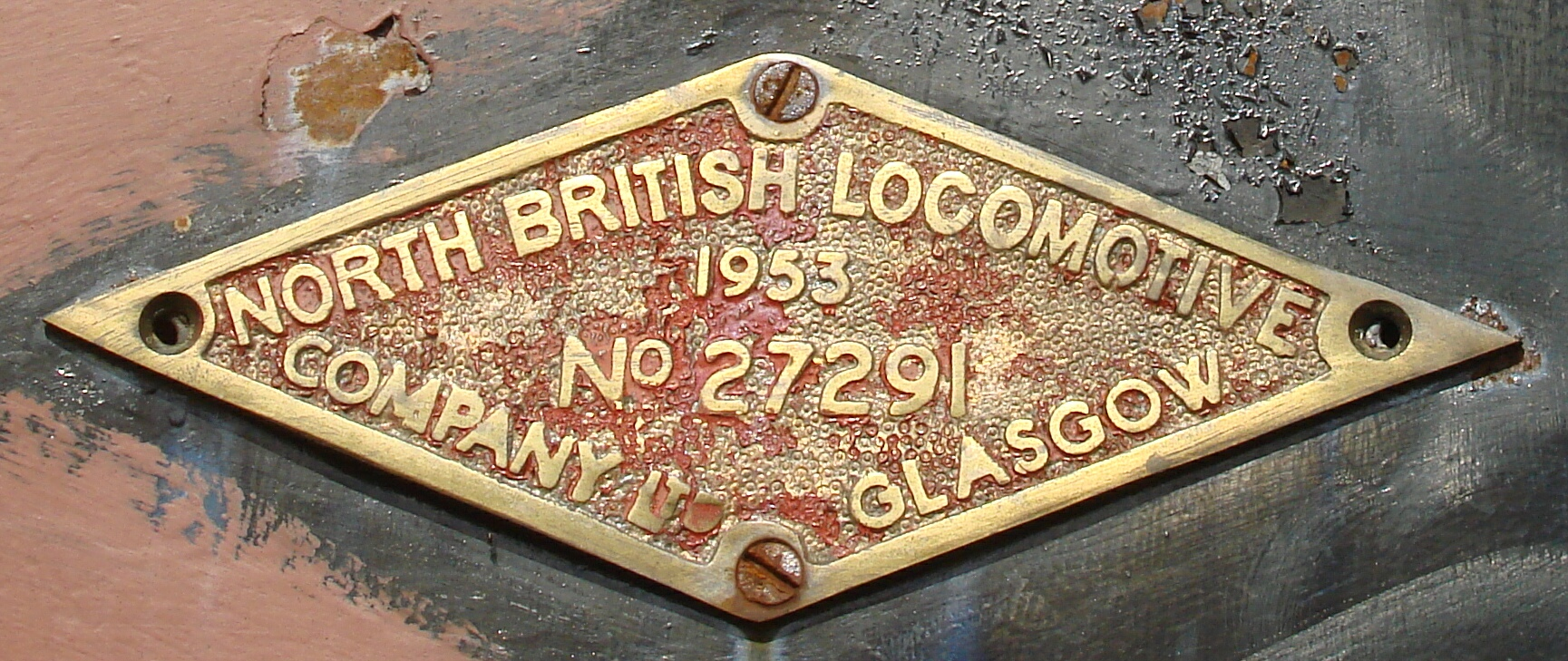
25NC 3405 Builders Plate

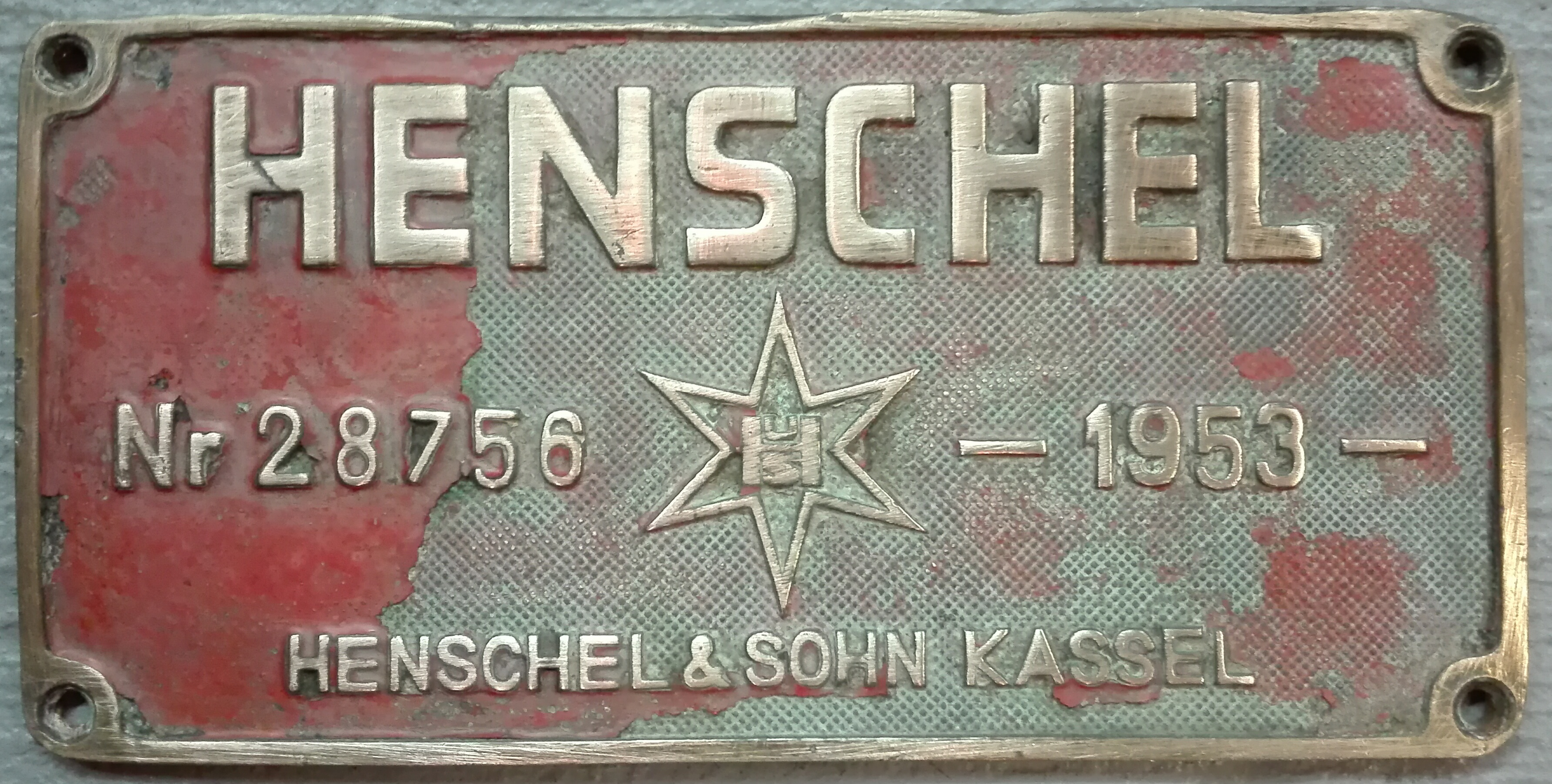
25Nc 3437 Builders Plate

The Class 25NC non-condensing and Class 25 condensing 4-8-4 Northern type steam locomotives were designed by the South African Railways (SAR) under the direction of LC Grubb, Chief Mechanical Engineer of the SAR from 1949 to 1954, in conjunction with Henschel & Son of Kassel in Germany who designed the condensing apparatus and the condensing tender of the Class 25 sister locomotive. Between 1953 and 1955,eleven Class 25NC locomotives were built by the North British Locomotive Company (NBL) and numbered in the range from 3401 to 3411 while 39 locomotives were built by Henschel and numbered in the range from 3412 to 3450.

== Characteristics ==
The Class 25NC was superheated and used piston valves actuated by Walschaerts valve gear. Timken roller bearings were used throughout, including on the three-axle tender bogies, the coupling and connecting rods as well as the crosshead gudgeon pins, while the locomotive's leading bogies and coupled wheels had Cannon-type axle boxes. Compared to earlier SAR practice, a novelty was the adoption of mechanical lubrication. A sixteen-feed lubricator was driven off the expansion link trunnion. The cylinders and frames were cast in one piece by Commonwealth Steel Company in the United States. The steel cylinders and steam chests were fitted with cast iron liners. Being entirely mounted on roller bearings, very little effort was required to move these locomotives.

The Alligator type crossheads were split on the vertical centre line and clamped on to the end of the piston rods, which had three coned rings engaging in grooves in the crossheads. The original coupling rods differed from the usual in being three separate rods, thereby doing away with four knuckle joints and pins.

The multiple-valve superheater header was of the Melesco type. The boiler was fitted with four Ross-pop safety valves, each 2 1/2 inches (64 millimetres) in diameter, and two Hopkinson boiler blowdown cocks on the firebox wrapper, one on each side. Feedwater was delivered to the boiler by two Friedmann vertical type non-lifting injectors, each with a capacity of 5,200 imperial gallons (23,600 litres; 6,240 US gallons) per hour.

The locomotive was equipped with a Type EW1 tender which was equipped with a mechanical stoker of which the engine was mounted on the tender. The tank had a water capacity of 10,500 imperial gallons (47,700 litres; 12,600 US gallons) and the coal bunker a capacity of 18 long tons (18.3 tonnes; 20.2 short tons). The tender frame was also a one-piece steel casting and was a water-bottom frame, with the frame itself forming the bottom of the tank instead of being a separate tank and frame as in previous designs.

== Teething troubles ==
Soon after entering service, problems were experienced with failing connecting rods, big end bearings breaking up as well as cracks developing in the motion girder of the Alligator crossheads. After investigations by SAR engineers with assistance from the South African Council for Scientific and Industrial Research, the crossheads, slide bars and coupling rods were modified. The crossheads were converted to the multiple-bearing type with single guide bars while the three independent coupling rods were replaced with the more conventional single coupling rod with knuckle joints.

When new, the tapered Timken crankpin roller bearings soon became notorious for throwing their lubricant onto the underside of the boiler, from where it ran down to the lowest point and dripped onto the coupled wheel tyres along the way. This manufacturer's fault also applied to the Class 25 and was one of the reasons for the reputation of both classes of being slippery. Timken managed to resolve the problem before all their bearings had been replaced, but by then about two-thirds of the locomotives had already been fitted with redesigned coupling rods with SKF crankpin ball bearings.

== Service ==
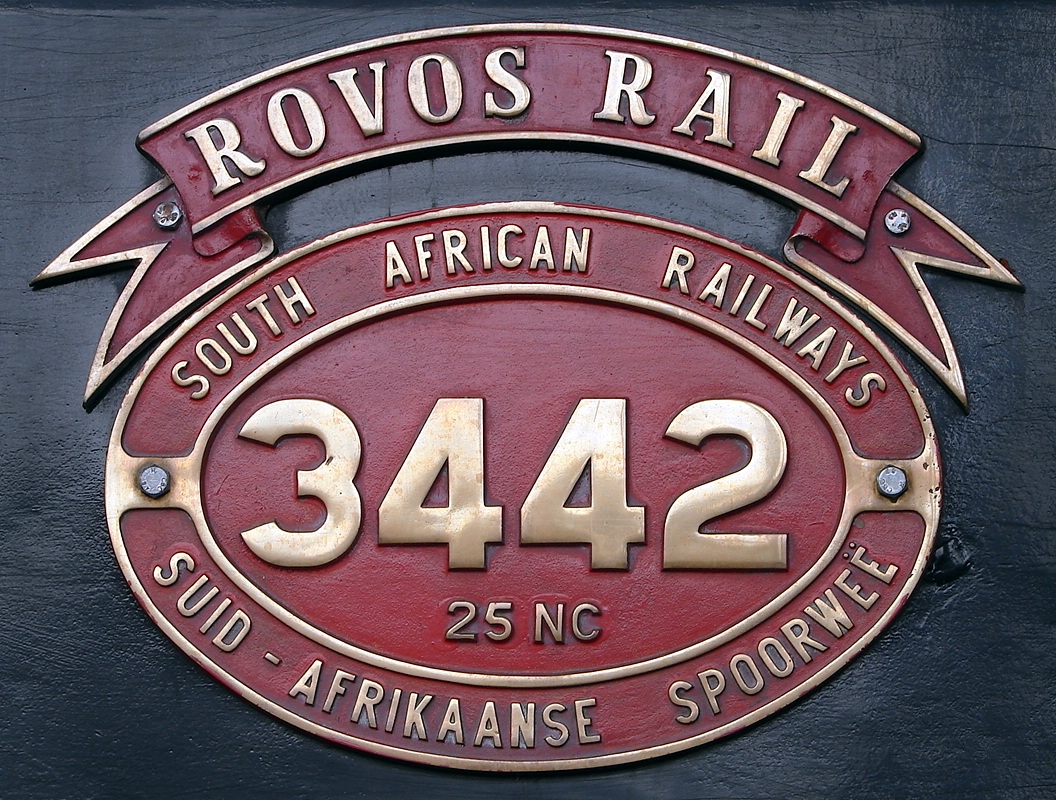

The Class 25NC initially served on the unelectrified mainlines from De Aar via Kimberley to Welverdiend. They were pooled from their introduction and were run through from De Aar to Welverdiend and vice versa, recoaling at Warrenton. After electrification was extended from Welverdiend to Klerksdorp, they ran from there to De Aar, still recoaling at Warrenton. Later they also worked from Kimberley via Bloemfontein to Harrismith in the Free State while some joined the Class 25 condensers on the line from De Aar via Beaufort West to Touws River.

When the line south from De Aar was dieselised between 1973 and 1974, the Class 25 condensers working there were moved north to work the section from De Aar to Kimberley, where they replaced twenty-two Class 25NCs which were then relocated to Bethlehem in the Free State. From 1982, Class 25NCs also replaced Class 19Ds and Class GMAM Garratts on the line from Warrenton via Vryburg to Mafeking.

== Class 25 rebuilding ==
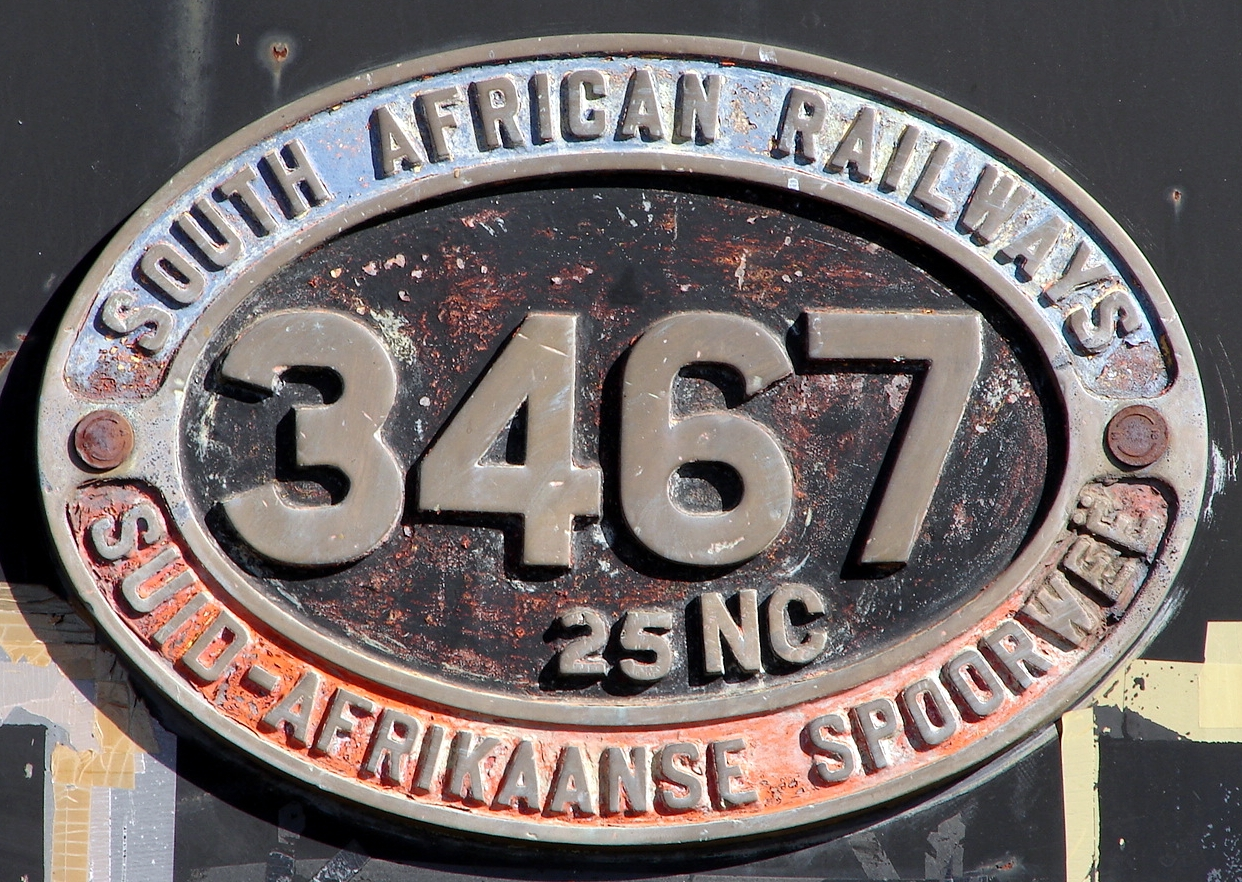

Along with the Class 25NC, ninety Class 25 condensing locomotives were built as part of the same order, one by Henschel and the rest by NBL. The condensing apparatus for these engines and their condensing tenders were designed and patented by Henschel.

Between 1973 and 1980, all but three of the ninety Class 25 condensers were converted to non-condensing locomotives and reclassified to Class 25NC, the exceptions being numbers 3451, 3511 and 3540. The number plates of some were copied and recast with the additional "NC" for "non-condensing" squeezed in next to the existing "25", which resulted in a lopsided class indication on their cabside plates. Locomotives with all four characters neatly in line and centred were therefore usually identifiable as original Class 25NCs.

In the process, their Type CZ condensing tenders were also rebuilt to ordinary coal-and-water Type EW2 tenders by removing the condensing radiators and roof fans and replacing it with a massive water tank. Since the Type CZ tenders were built on single cast steel water-bottom frames it was impractical to attempt to shorten them, which resulted in the rebuilt Type EW2 tenders with their long round-topped water tanks. Locomotives with these rebuilt tenders were soon nicknamed Worshond (Sausage dog or Dachshund).

== The Class 26 Red Devil ==
Between 1979 and 1981 no. 3450, the last Class 25NC to be built, was rebuilt to the sole Class 26, the Red Devil, at the SAR workshops at Salt River, Cape Town. The primary objectives of the project were to improve the combustion and steaming rate, to reduce the emission of wasteful black smoke and to overcome the problem of clinkering.

This was achieved by the use of a Gas Producer Combustion System, which relies on the gasification of coal on a low temperature firebed so that the gases are then fully burnt above the firebed. These extensive modifications justified reclassification and the locomotive became the first and only Class 26, although the locomotive's original Class 25NC number was retained.

== Project Zimbabwe ==
During 1988 a severe motive power shortage was experienced by the National Railways of Zimbabwe and discussions with South Africa revealed that numerous class 25NC 4-8-4, had been recently withdrawn from service and were available for either hire or purchase. NRZ decided to investigate the purchase of 20 to 25 of these locomotives for a short-term basis. A team of three were sent down from Bulawayo inspected 50 locomotives at Warrenton and De Aar.

A list of 28 locomotives was submitted from which it would be possible to choose 20 to 25, or any lesser number which might be needed

Category A (locomotives with 5 or more years before heavy overhaul)

3404, 3410, 3422, 3428, 3438, 3442, 3445, 3453, 3457, 3459, 3479, 3504, 3508, 3519

Category B (needing heavy repairs by 1993–1994)

3412, 3424, 3464, 3473, 3475, 3490, 3498, 3507, 3518, 3520, 3537

Category C (needing heavy repairs by 1992)

3439, 3446, 3515

The project did not materialise but several did survive into preservation.

== Works numbers ==
The locomotive numbers, builders and works numbers are listed in the table. On the builders' works lists, all the locomotives are shown as having been built in 1953. All tenders bore the same works number as the engines they were built with, except the sixty tenders which were built by Henschel for condensing engines which were built by NBL. These sixty tenders were allocated Henschel works numbers.

Class 25NC 4-8-4 Non-Condensing Builders, Works Numbers, Tender Builders & Rebuilding
Loco no	Builder	Works no	Tender Builder	Tender Works no	Rebuilt Date from class 25 to class 25nc	Date and Place Scrapped
3401	NBL	27287				2007 Bethlehem
3402	NBL	27288				1986 Bloemfontein Works
3403	NBL	27289				2007 Bloemfontein
3404	NBL	27290				
3405	NBL	27291				
3406	NBL	27292				1983 Bloemfontein Works
3407	NBL	27293				
3408	NBL	27294				2007 Bethlehem
3409	NBL	27295				2010 Jan Kempdorp
3410	NBL	27296				
3411	NBL	27311				
3412	Henschel	28731				2007 Bloemfontein
3413	Henschel	28732				2007 Bethlehem
3414	Henschel	28733				2008 Krugerersdorp
3415	Henschel	28734				2007 Bethlehem
3416	Henschel	28735				1983 Bloemfontein Works
3417	Henschel	28736				2016 Worcester
3418	Henschel	28737				2007 Bethlehem
3419	Henschel	28738				2007 Bethlehem
3420	Henschel	28739				2007 Bethlehem
3421	Henschel	28740				2007 Bethlehem
3422	Henschel	28741				
3423	Henschel	28742				1993 De Aar
3424	Henschel	28743				1993 De Aar
3425	Henschel	28744				2007 Kimberley
3426	Henschel	28745				2007 Kimberley
3427	Henschel	28746				2007 Kimberley
3428	Henschel	28747				1993 De Aar
3429	Henschel	28748				1993 De Aar
3430	Henschel	28749				1993 De Aar
3431	Henschel	28750				2007 Bethlehem
3432	Henschel	28751				
3433	Henschel	28752				1985 Bloemfontein Works
3434	Henschel	28753				1993 De Aar
3435	Henschel	28754				2007 Warrenton
3436	Henschel	28755				1993 De Aar
3437	Henschel	28756				
3438	Henschel	28757				2010 Jan Kempdorp
3439	Henschel	28758				2007 Warrenton
3440	Henschel	28759				
3441	Henschel	28760				
3442	Henschel	28761				
3443	Henschel	28762				2007 Kimberley
3444	Henschel	28763				2007 Kimberley
3445	Henschel	28764				2007 Warrenton
3446	Henschel	28765				2007 Warrenton
3447	Henschel	28766				2007 Kimberley
3448	Henschel	28767				2007 Kimberley
3449	Henschel	28768				2007 Kimberley
3450	Henschel	28769			Class 26 Red Devil	
3452	NBL	27312	Henschel	28780	1976-09	1993 De Aar
3453	NBL	27313	Henschel	28781	1977-11	2010 Jan Kempdorp
3454	NBL	27314	Henschel	28782	1977-06	
3455	NBL	27315	Henschel	28783	1975-09	1993 De Aar
3456	NBL	27316	Henschel	28784	1976-07	2007 Kimberley
3457	NBL	27317	Henschel	28785	1978-01	
3458	NBL	27318	Henschel	28786	1975-01	1993 De Aar
3459	NBL	27319	Henschel	28787	XX	2007 Warrenton
3460	NBL	27320	Henschel	28788	XX	2007 Kimberley
3461	NBL	27321	Henschel	28789	1975-10	1983 Salt River
3462	NBL	27322	Henschel	28790	1979-12	2007 Warrenton
3463	NBL	27323	Henschel	28791	XX	1987 Bloemfontein Works
3464	NBL	27324	Henschel	28792	1976-10	2007 Warrenton
3465	NBL	27325	Henschel	28793	1975-06	1993 De Aar
3466	NBL	27326	Henschel	28794	1976-04	2007 Kimberley
3467	NBL	27327	Henschel	28795	1979-07	
3468	NBL	27328	Henschel	28796	XX	1993 De Aar
3469	NBL	27329	Henschel	28797	1979-05	2007 Kimberley
3470	NBL	27330	Henschel	28798	1975-06	1993 De Aar
3471	NBL	27331	Henschel	28799	1976-05	1993 De Aar
3472	NBL	27332	Henschel	28800	XX	
3473	NBL	27333	Henschel	28801	1976-07	1993 De Aar
3474	NBL	27334	Henschel	28802	1979-04	2007 Warrenton
3475	NBL	27335	Henschel	28803	1976-06	2007 Bloemfontein
3476	NBL	27336	Henschel	28804	1979-06	
3477	NBL	27337	Henschel	28805	XX	2007 Warrenton
3478	NBL	27338	Henschel	28806	1978-08	2007 Kimberley
3479	NBL	27339	Henschel	28807	1979-05	2016 Bloemfontein
3480	NBL	27340	Henschel	28808	1975-05	2014 Capital Park(Rovos Rail)
3481	NBL	27341	Henschel	28809	1975-10	2008 Dal Josafat
3482	NBL	27342	Henschel	28810	1979-02	
3483	NBL	27343	Henschel	28811	1975-11	2007 Kimberley
3484	NBL	27344	Henschel	28812	1978-05	2014 Capital Park(Rovos Rail)
3485	NBL	27345	Henschel	28813	1976-11	2007 Kimberley
3486	NBL	27346	Henschel	28814	1976-12	2007 Kimberley
3487	NBL	27347	Henschel	28815	1974-11	1993 De Aar
3488	NBL	27348	Henschel	28816	1976-08	
3489	NBL	27349	Henschel	28817	1977-03	2007 Warrenton
3490	NBL	27350	Henschel	28818	1976-05	2007 Warrenton
3491	NBL	27351	Henschel	28819	1975-02	2007 Warrenton
3492	NBL	27352	Henschel	28820	1974-11	1993 De Aar
3493	NBL	27353	Henschel	28821	1975-11	2007 Kimberley
3494	NBL	27354	Henschel	28822	1975-11	2010 Jan Kempdorp
3495	NBL	27355	Henschel	28823	1979-12	2007 Warrenton
3496	NBL	27356	Henschel	28824	1978-08	
3497	NBL	27357	Henschel	28825	1975-02	1993 De Aar
3498	NBL	27358	Henschel	28826	1977-01	2010 Jan Kempdorp
3499	NBL	27359	Henschel	28827	1975-06	2007 Kimberley
3500	NBL	27360	Henschel	28828	1978-02	2007 Kimberley
3501	NBL	27361	Henschel	28829	1979-08	
3502	NBL	27362	Henschel	28830	1976-02	2007 Kimberley
3503	NBL	27363	Henschel	28831	1975-05	2007 Warrenton
3504	NBL	27364	Henschel	28832	1977-09	2007 Warrenton
3505	NBL	27365	Henschel	28833	1981-10	2007 Kimberley
3506	NBL	27366	Henschel	28834	1974-12	1993 De Aar
3507	NBL	27367	Henschel	28835	1976-10	1993 De Aar
3508	NBL	27368	Henschel	28836	1977-03	
3509	NBL	27369	Henschel	28837	1976-02	1993 De Aar
3510	NBL	27370	Henschel	28838	1978-04	1987 Bloemfontein Works
3512	NBL	27372			1974-10	1993 De Aar
3513	NBL	27373			1974-07	2007 Bloemfontein
3514	NBL	27374			1976-09	2007 Kimberley
3515	NBL	27375			1975-08	1993 De Aar
3516	NBL	27376			1979-04	2007 Kimberley
3517	NBL	27377			1976-03	2007 Kimberley
3518	NBL	27378			1977-02	2007 Bloemfontein
3519	NBL	27379			1977-02	2007 Warrenton
3520	NBL	27380			1976-03	2007 Warrenton
3521	NBL	27381			1977-04	2007 Warrenton
3522	NBL	27382			1975-12	1993 De Aar
3523	NBL	27383			1975-09	1993 De Aar
3524	NBL	27384			1979-10	2007 Warrenton
3525	NBL	27385			1976-08	2007 Kimberley
3526	NBL	27386			1979-01	2007 Kimberley
3527	NBL	27387			1978-06	2007 Kimberley
3528	NBL	27388			1976-06	2010 Jan Kempdorp
3529	NBL	27389			1976-02	2007 Kimberley
3530	NBL	27390			1975-04	1993 De Aar
3531	NBL	27391			1979-11	2007 Warrenton
3532	NBL	27392			1978-10	1987 Bloemfontein Works
3533	NBL	27393			1978-03	
3534	NBL	27394			1976-05	2007 Kimberley
3535	NBL	27395			1979-02	2007 Kimberley
3536	NBL	27396			1978-11	
3537	NBL	27397			1975-12	
3538	NBL	27398			1978-08	1987 Bloemfontein Works
3539	NBL	27399			1979-10	2007 Warrenton

== Preservation ==
The following is a list of 25NC and 26 class that have survived. AUGUST 2025.

Most are still owned by the Transnet Heritage Foundation. None except the class 25Nc 3437 & 25Nc 3482 (and it only for the winter months) are mainline certified as of 1 January 2019.

Number (*EW2 tenders)	Works number	Transnet Heritage Foundation / Private	Leaselend / Owner	Current Location	Notes
3404	NBL 27290	Transnet Heritage Foundation		Germiston Locomotive Depot	
3405	NBL 27291	Private	Quainton Railway Society	Buckinghamshire Railway Centre, England	Repatriated 1991
3407*	NBL 27293	Private	Greg McLennan	Worcester Locomotive Depot	
3410	NBL 27296	Transnet Heritage Foundation	Transnet Heritage Foundation	Bloemfontein Locomotive Depot	Selected as Transnet Heritage Foundation representative of the class (National Collection)
3411	NBL 27311	Transnet Heritage Foundation	Museum	Kimberley station	
3422	Hensc 28741	Transnet Heritage Foundation		Cape Town station	Oilburner
3432	Hensc 28751	Private	Mainline Steam Heritage Trust	Auckland, New Zealand	Exported 1996
3437*	Hensc 28752	Private	Oscar Sabitini	Kimberley Locomotive Depot	Passed boiler test July 2024 Operational
3440	Hensc 28759	Private	Rovos Rail	Capital Park Locomotive Depot	Scrapped 3440 or 3480
3441*	Hensc 28760	Transnet Heritage Foundation	Steamnet 2000	Kimberley Locomotive Depot	
3442*	Hensc 28761	Private	Rovos Rail	Capital Park Locomotive Depot	Named Anthea
3454*	NBL 27314	Transnet Heritage Foundation		Bloemfontein Locomotive Depot	
3457*	NBL 27317	Transnet Heritage Foundation	Steamnet 2000	Kimberley Locomotive Depot	
3467	NBL 27327	Transnet Heritage Foundation	Steamnet 2000	Kimberley Locomotive Depot	
3472	NBL 27331	Transnet Heritage Foundation		Germiston Locomotive Depot	
3476	NBL 27336	Transnet Heritage Foundation		Waterval Boven	
3480	NBL 27340	Private	Rovos Rail	Capital Park Locomotive Depot	Scrapped 3440 or 3480
3482	NBL 27342	Transnet Heritage Foundation	Steamnet 2000	Kimberley Locomotive Depot	Passed boiler test June 2023 Operational
3488*	NBL 27348	Private	Sandstone Estates	Sandstone Estate, Ficksburg	
3496	NBL 27356	Transnet Heritage Foundation	Sandstone Estates	Sandstone Estate	Partly converted to oilburner
3501*	NBL 2731	Transnet Heritage Foundation		Kimberley Locomotive Depot	Oil Burner
3508	NBL 27368	Private	Mainline Steam Heritage Trust	Auckland, New Zealand	Exported 1996
3533*	NBL 27393	Private	Rovos Rail	Capital Park Locomotive Depot	Named King Zog
3536	NBL 27396	Transnet Heritage Foundation	Sandstone Estates	Sandstone Estate	
3537	NBL 27397	Private	Henry Posner	Kimberley Locomotive Depot	
3450	Hensc 28397	Transnet Heritage Foundation	Ceres Railway Company	Royal Cape Yacht Club	

== Illustration ==
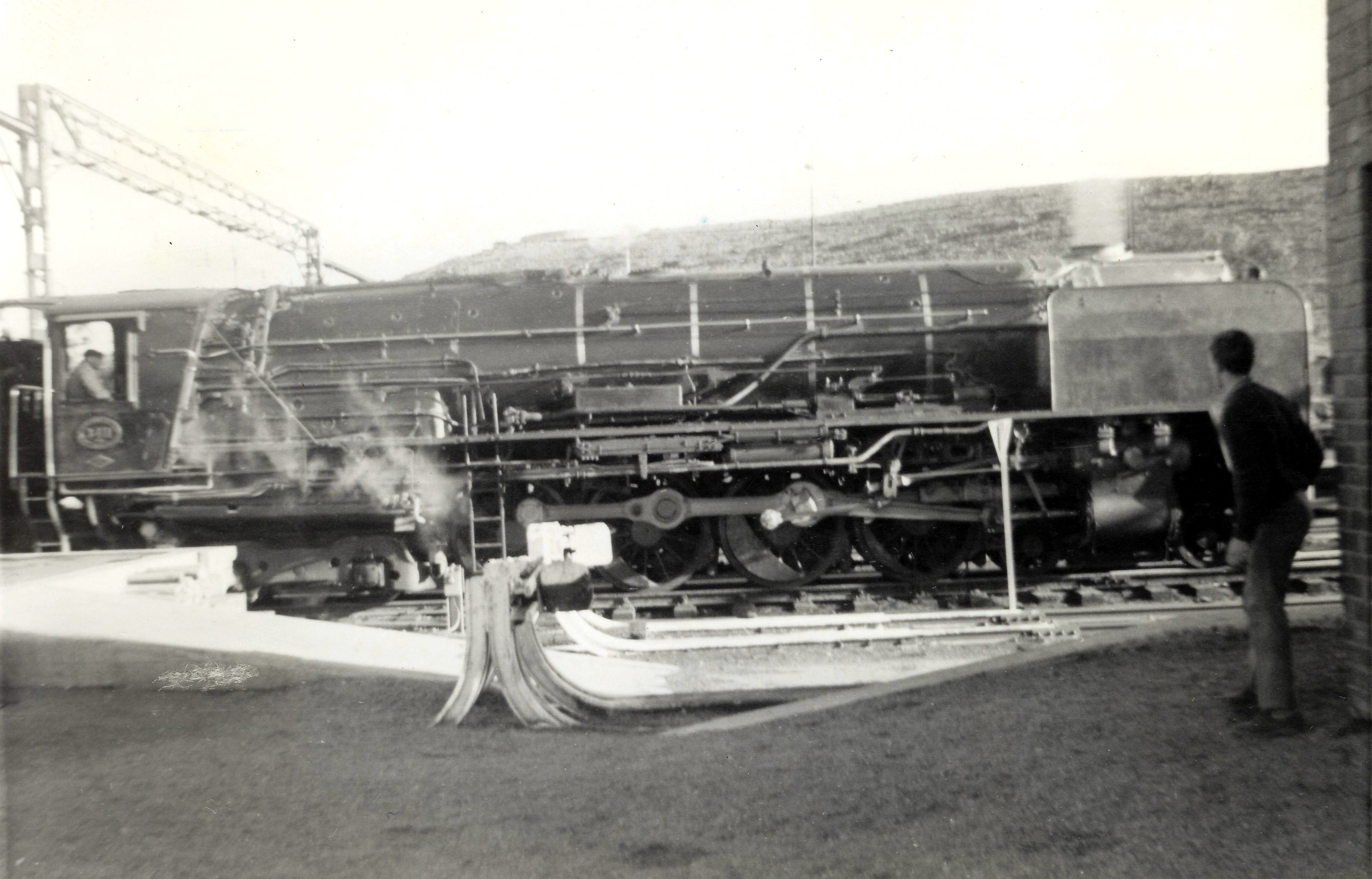
NBL-built no. 3411 relieving electric units on a northbound Trans-Karoo at Beaufort West, Cape Province, 26 June 1966

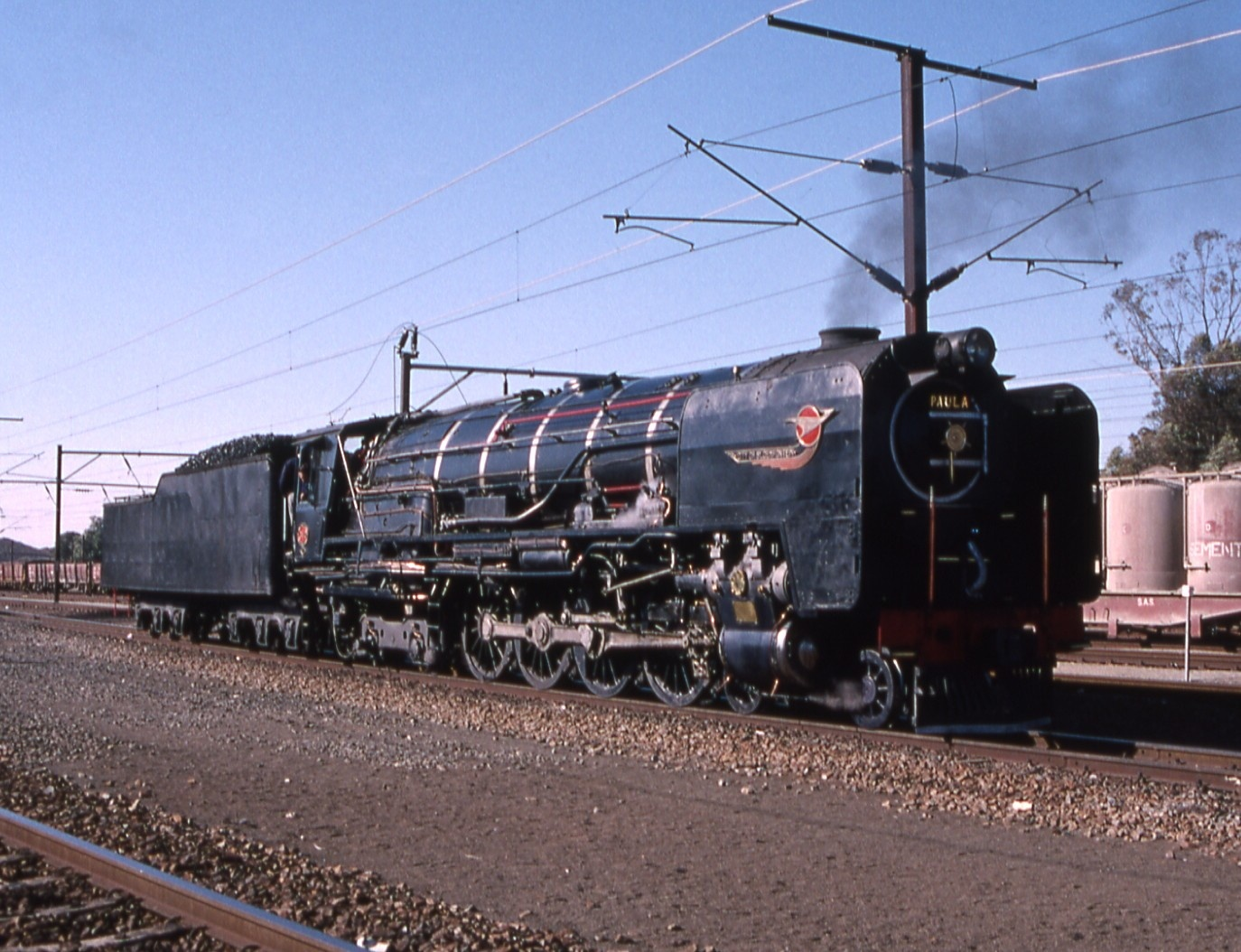
NBL-built no. 3410 Paula making its way to the water tanks at Springfontein in the Free State, c. 1995

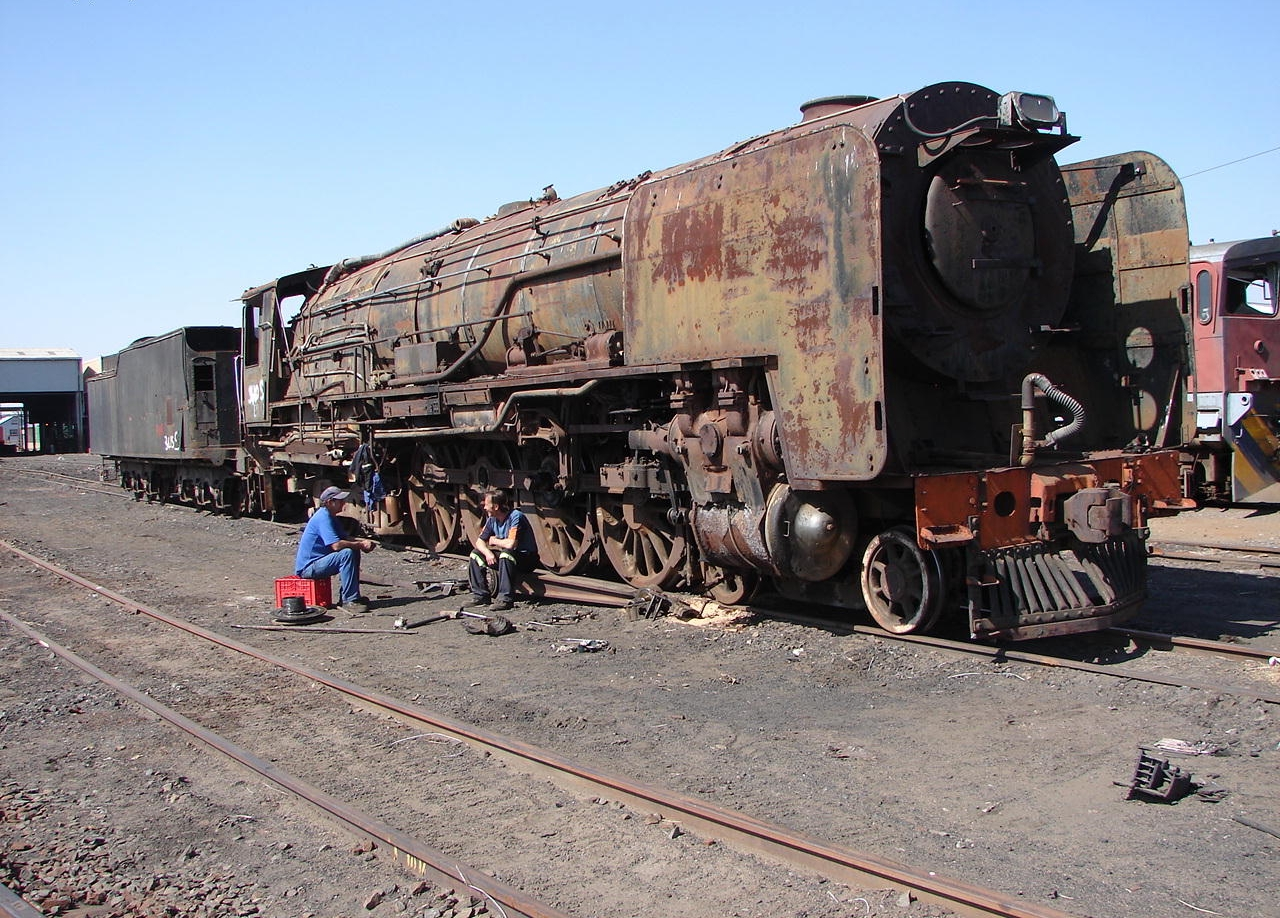
Preparing Henschel-built no. 3440 to be hauled to Pretoria for restoration by Rovos Rail, Beaconsfield, 25 August 2007

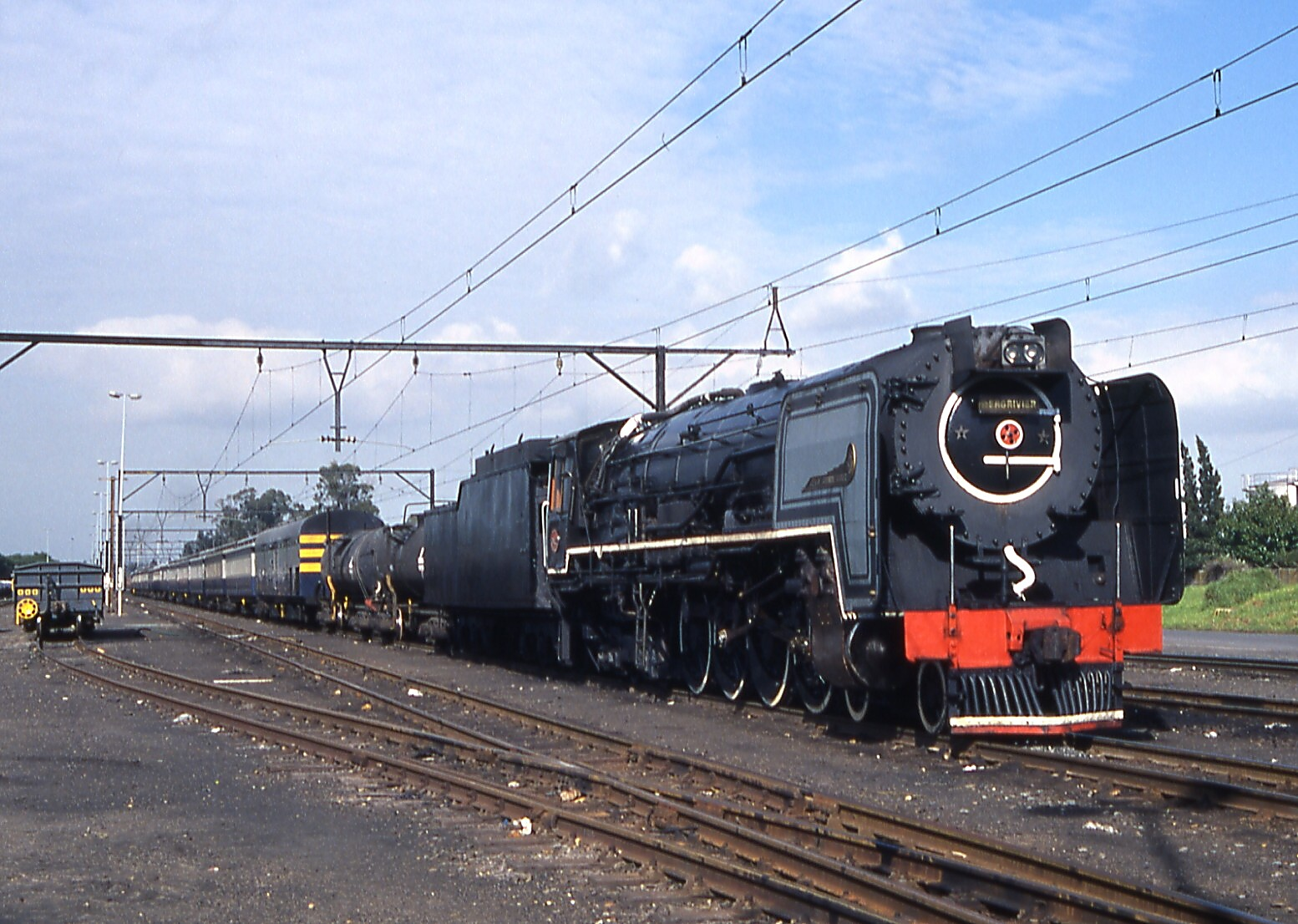
Henschel-built no. 3422 Bergrivier, converted to oil-firing, with two type X-20 water tenders on the Union Express, c. 2002

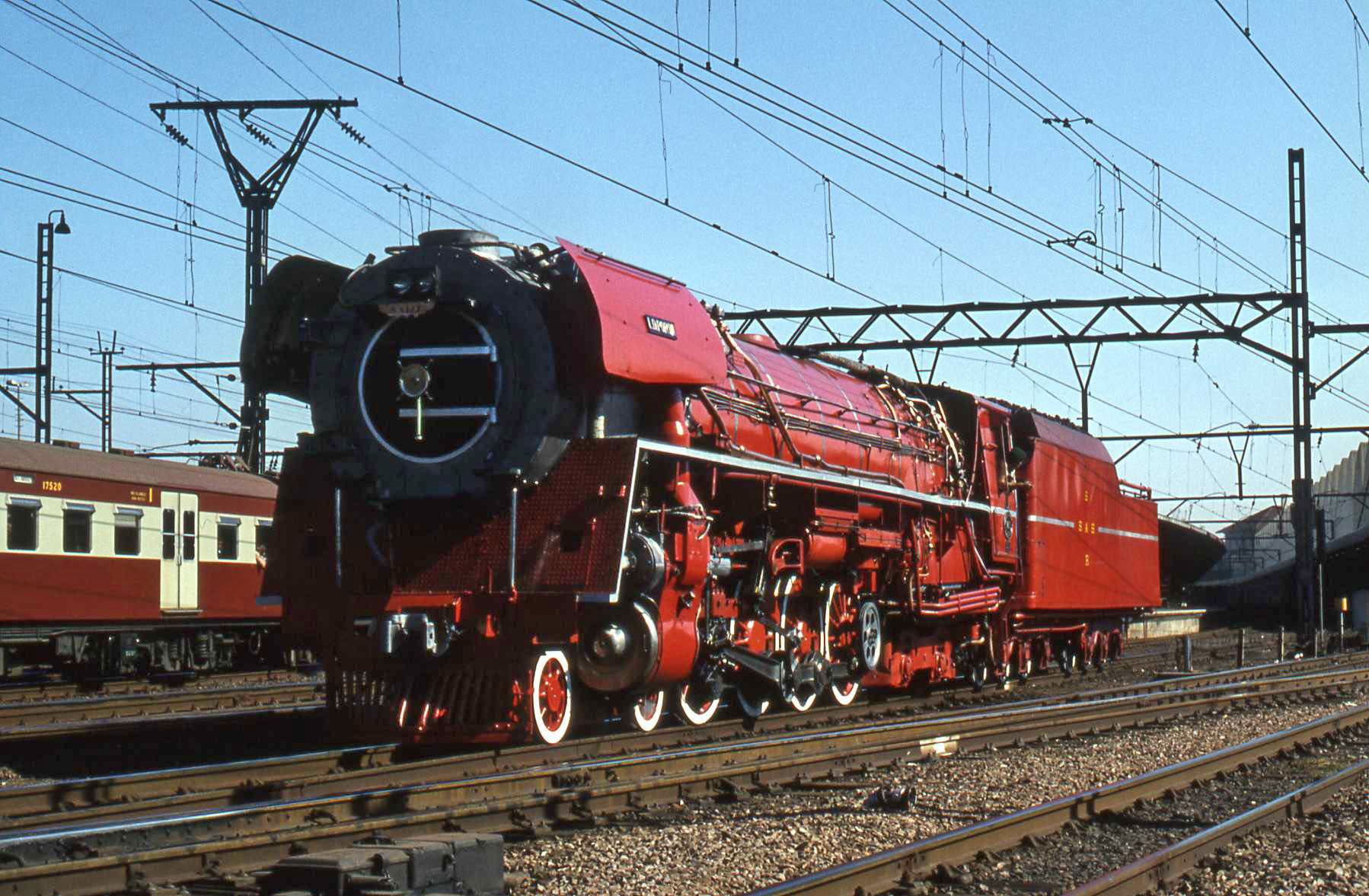
SAR-rebuilt Red Devil no. 3450, shortly after being rebuilt to the only Class 26, Pretoria, 25 April 1981
