= South African type EW1 tender =

Steam locomotive introduced in 1953

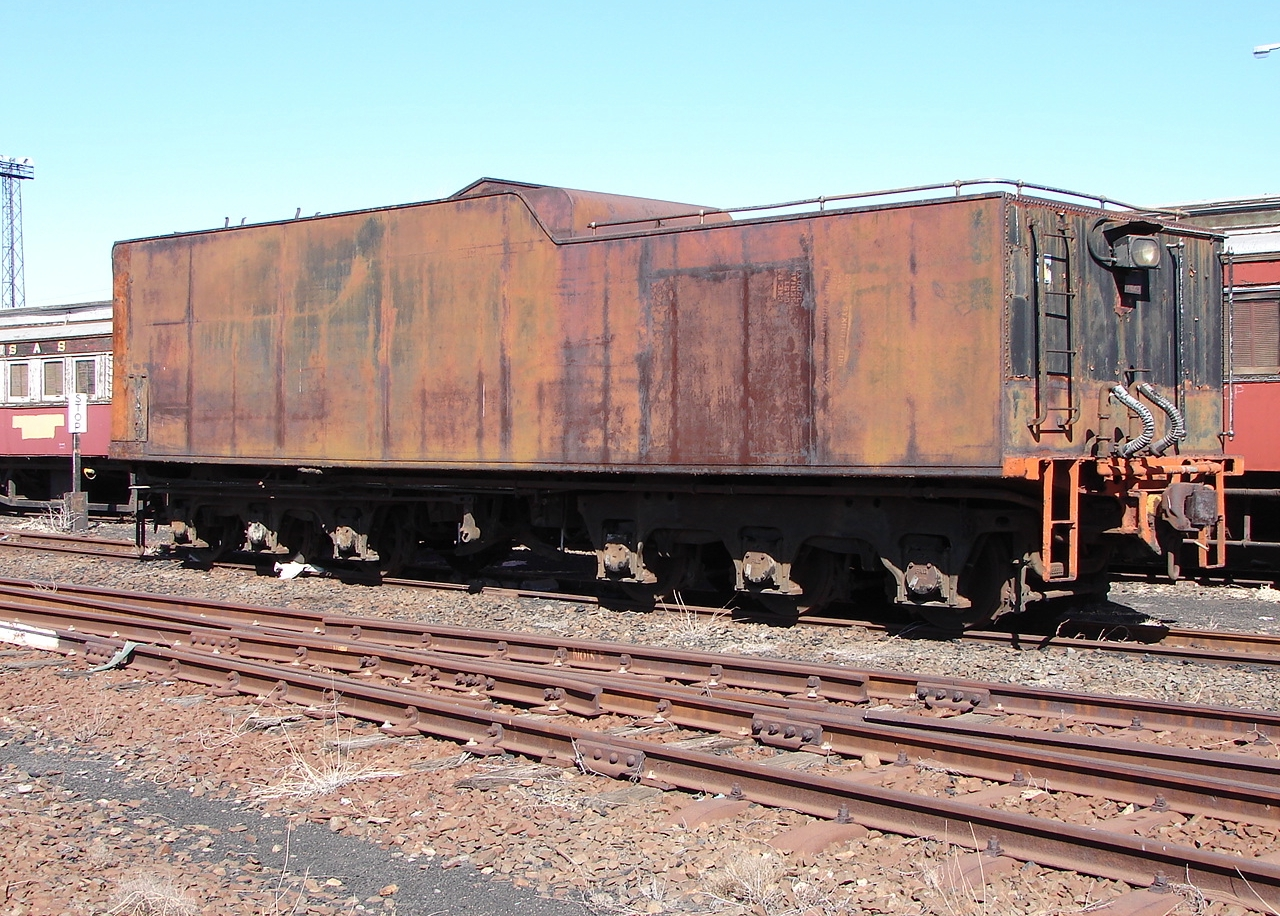
- Type EW1 tender off Class 25NC, 2009
Type and origin
- Locomotive: Class 25NC
- Designer: South African Railways (L.C. Grubb)
- Builder: North British Locomotive Company; Henschel and Son
- Works no.: NBL 27287-27296, 27311; Henschel 28731-28769
- In service: 1953
Specifications
- Configuration: 3-axle bogies
- Gauge: 3 ft 6 in (1,067 mm) Cape gauge
- Wheel dia.: 34 in (864 mm)
- Wheelbase: 32 ft (9,754 mm)
  - Bogie: 10 ft (3,048 mm)
- Axle load: 18 LT 1 cwt 2 qtr (18,370 kg)
  - Front bogie: 51 LT 6 cwt (52,120 kg)
  - Rear bogie: 54 LT 5 cwt (55,120 kg)
- Weight empty: 97,300 lb (44,100 kg)
- Weight w/o: 105 LT 11 cwt (107,200 kg)
- Fuel type: Coal
- Fuel cap.: 18 LT (18.3 t)
- Water cap.: 10,500 imp gal (47,700 L)
- Stoking: Mechanical
- Couplers: Drawbar & AAR knuckle
Career
- Operators: South African Railways
- Numbers: SAR 3401-3450

The South African type EW1 tender was a steam locomotive tender.

Type EW1 tenders entered service between 1953 and 1955 as tenders to the Class 25NC 4-8-4 Northern type steam locomotives which entered service on the South African Railways in those years.

== Manufacturers ==
Type EW1 tenders were built in 1953, eleven by North British Locomotive Company and 39 by Henschel and Son.

The South African Railways (SAR) placed fifty Class 25NC locomotives in service between 1953 and 1955. The locomotive and tender were designed by L.C. Grubb, Chief Mechanical Engineer of the SAR from 1949 to 1954. It was the non-condensing version of the Class 25 condensing locomotive, of which ninety were placed in service at the same time.

== Characteristics ==
The tender rode on six-wheeled bogies, each with a 10 feet (3,048 millimetres) wheelbase and fitted with Timken roller bearings. It was equipped with a mechanical stoker, of which the engine was mounted on the tender. The tank had a water capacity of 10,500 imperial gallons (47,700 litres) and the coal bunker a capacity of 18 long tons (18.3 tonnes). The tender had a one-piece steel casting water-bottom frame, with the frame itself forming the bottom of the tank instead of being a separate tank and frame as in previous designs. The casting was done by Commonwealth Steel Castings Corporation in the United States of America.

== Locomotive ==
Only Class 25NC locomotives were delivered new with Type EW1 tenders, which were numbered in the range from 3401 to 3450 for their engines. An oval number plate, bearing the engine number and often also the locomotive class and tender type, was attached to the rear end of the tender.

== Classification letters ==
Since many tender types are interchangeable between different locomotive classes and types, a tender classification system was adopted by the SAR. The first letter of the tender type indicates the classes of engines to which it could be coupled. The "E_" tenders were arranged with mechanical stokers and could be used with the locomotive classes as shown.

- Class 15F, if equipped with a mechanical stoker.
- Class 23.
- Class 25NC.
- Class 26.

The second letter indicates the tender's water capacity. The "_W1" tenders had a capacity of 10,500 imperial gallons (47,700 litres; 12,600 US gallons).

== Modification ==
Between 1979 and 1981, the last one of the Class 25NC locomotives, no. 3450, was rebuilt to the sole Class 26 Red Devil. The coal capacity of this locomotive's Type EW1 tender was increased from 18 long tons (18.3 tonnes) to approximately 20 long tons (20.3 tonnes) by raising the bunker sides. Since the water capacity remained unchanged, the tender was not reclassified.

A number, when added after the letter code, indicates differences between similar tender types, such as function, wheelbase or coal bunker capacity.

== Illustration ==
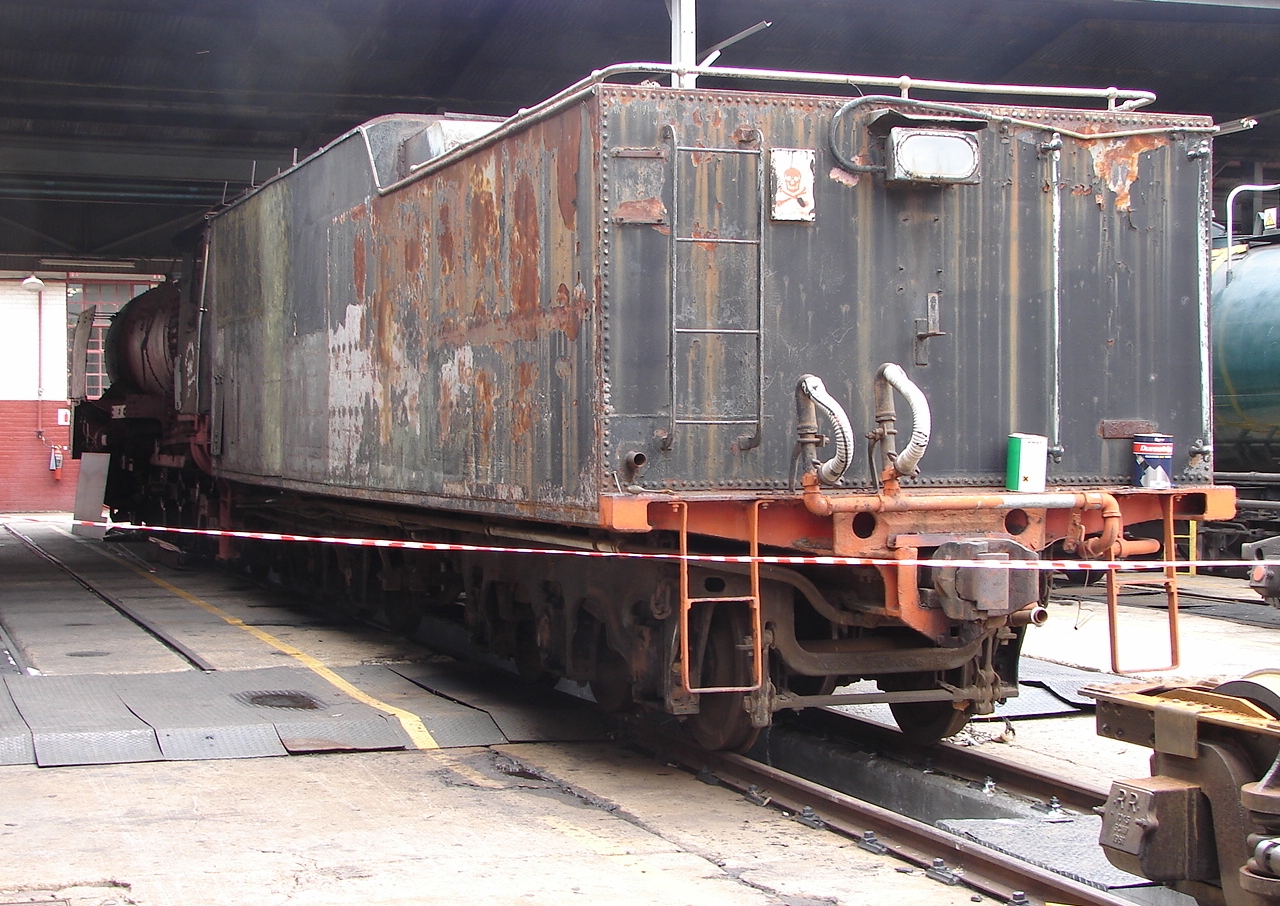
Type EW1 rear end, 2009

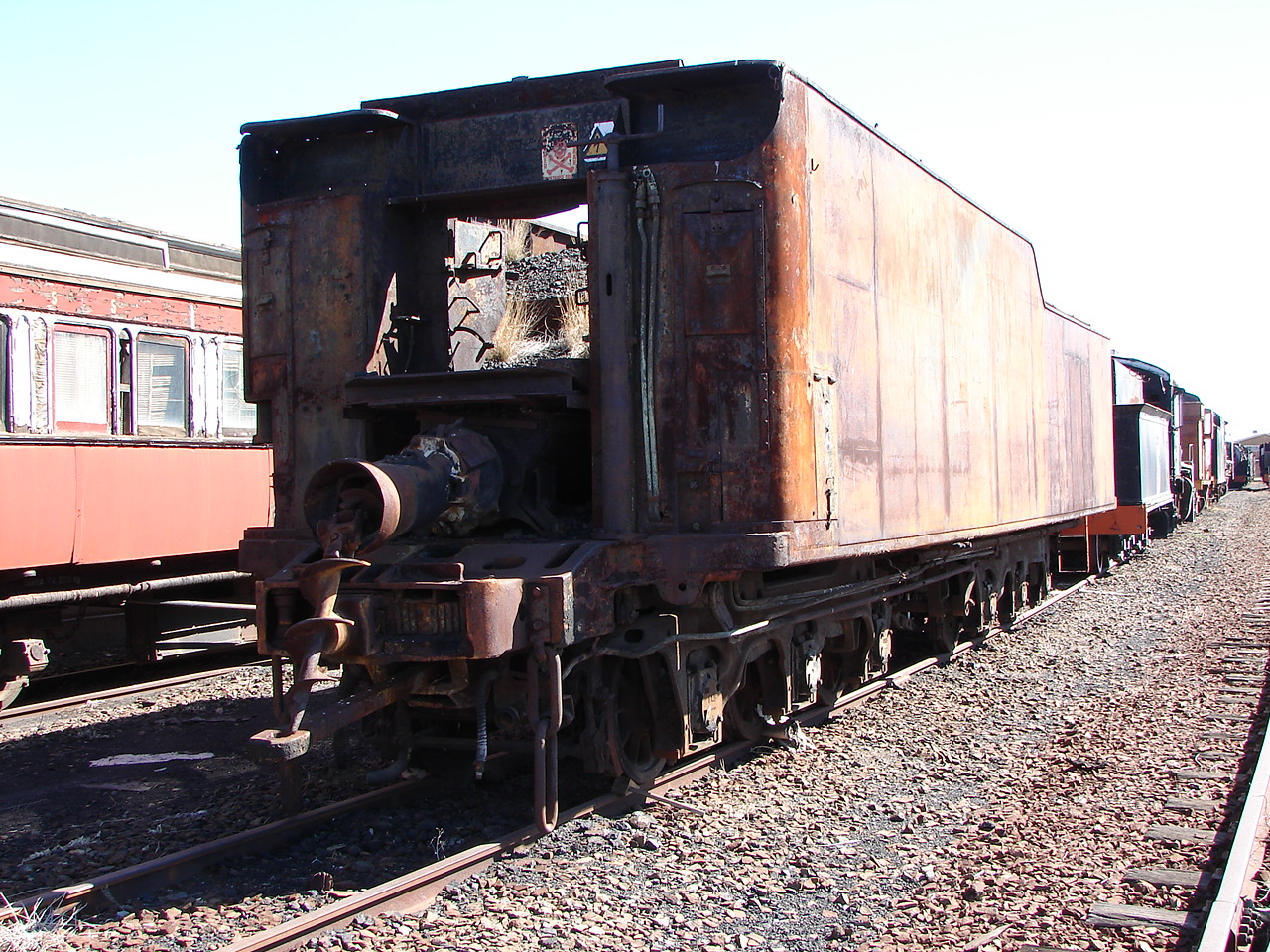
Type EW1 showing stoker worm, 2009

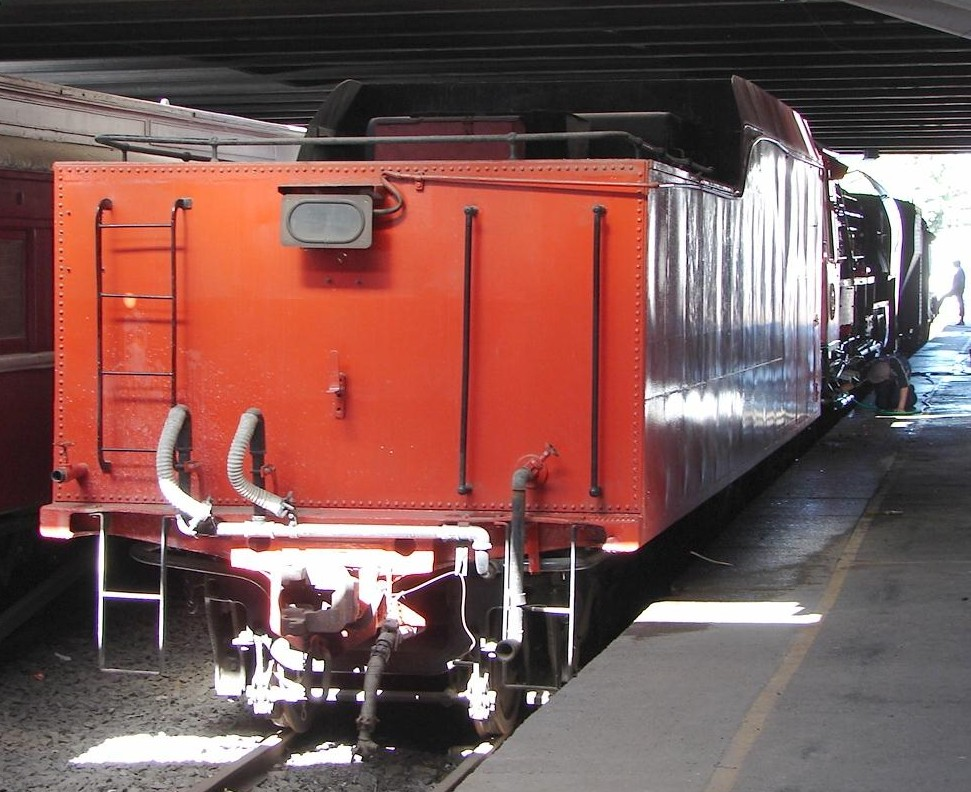
Raised bunker sides, Red Devil, 2010
