= 20P =

20P or 20p may refer to:

== Money ==
- Twenty pence (British coin) (20p), a coin of the United Kingdom, worth 1/5 of a pound
- Twenty pence (Irish coin) (20p), a coin of Ireland, worth 1/5 of a pound
- Gold penny (English coin), a medieval England coin worth 20 pence (20p) or 1/12 of a pound

== Other uses ==
- Tropical Depression 20P (1995), a storm in the 1994–95 Australian region cyclone season
- Tropical Low 20P (2008), a storm in the 2007–08 Australian region cyclone season
- Progress 20P, a Russian 2005-2006 unmanned space mission to the International Space Station
- South Dakota Highway 20P, United States

== See also ==
- P (disambiguation)
- 20 (disambiguation)
- 2P (disambiguation)
- P20 (disambiguation)
