= P20 =

P20 may refer to:

== Military ==
- ARA Murature (P-20), a minelayer and patrol boat of the Argentine Navy
- Curtiss YP-20, a prototype fighter of the United States Army Air Service
- LÉ Deirdre (P20), a patrol vessel of the Irish Naval Service
- Lippisch P.20, a proposed World War II German fighter aircraft
- P-20 radar, a Soviet radar
- P-20, a variant of the USSR P-15 Termit missile

== Other uses ==
- Avi Suquilla Airport, in La Paz County, Arizona, United States
- Huawei P20, a smartphone
- Papyrus 20, a biblical manuscript
- Toyota Publica (P20), a subcompact car
- P-20, a Latvian state regional road

== See also ==
- P2O-Lab (Process-to-Order Lab), Dresden University of Technology
- P_{2}O (diphosphorus monoxide), see phosphorus monoxide (P_{1}O_{1})
- P (disambiguation)
- 20 (disambiguation)
- P2 (disambiguation)
- 20P (disambiguation)
