= Radio P2 =

Radio P2 may refer to:

- DR P2, Danish radio station
- NRK P2, Norwegian radio station
- Sveriges Radio P2, Swedish radio station

== See also ==
- P2 (disambiguation)
