= P. =

P. is an abbreviation or acronym that may refer to:

- Page (paper), where the abbreviation comes from Latin pagina
- Paris Herbarium, at the Muséum national d'histoire naturelle
- Pani (Polish), translating as Mrs.
- The Pacific Reporter
- Pádraig Flynn, a former Irish politician

== See also ==
- P (disambiguation)
- P, the letter
