= 2P =

2P may refer to:

== Science ==
- 2P/Encke, official designation of Comet Encke
- 2p, an arm of Chromosome 2 (human)
- 2p, an atomic orbital for electrons
- Two-photon absorption
- Two-photon excitation microscopy

== Transportation ==
- Airphil Express, a Philippines airline, IATA code 2P
- LMS Class 2P 4-4-0, a British locomotive

== Other ==
- 2P, a 408mm artillery piece from the Soviet Union
- Two pence (British decimal coin), currently circulating
- 2P, rapper 2 Pistols
- 2P reserves, proven reserves of fossil fuels
- 2P, meaning "player 2" in fandoms which can include inverting a character's personality and appearance
- 2P, meaning "Second-Party" as a digital sales model sitting between first-party (1P) supplier relationship and third-party (3P) independent seller relationship, notably as partner/seller of record on Amazon for brands.

== See also ==
- P2 (disambiguation)
