= P (disambiguation) =

P, or p, is the sixteenth letter of the Latin alphabet.

P may also refer to:

- Rho (letter), in Greek alphabet; the lowercase p is also sometimes confused with the lowercase Rho, ρ or ϱ
- Er (Cyrillic), in Cyrillic alphabet; it is sometimes confused with the Latin letter P
- 𝔓^{n} siglum for New Testament papyrus with Gregory-Aland number n
- In linguistics, P (also O), the patient-like argument (object) of a canonical transitive verb
- Encircled P, or ℗, is the sound recording copyright symbol
- p., an abbreviation for page when referencing a page number in a print publication
- Portugal country code in the vehicle registration plates of the European Union
- Parking, see also Parking (disambiguation).
- P (Nazi symbol), worn by Polish forced labourers during Nazi occupation
- P, the aircraft registration prefix for North Korean planes
- P, an abbreviation of gridiron football position punter

== Arts, literature and music ==
- P, code for the Paris Herbarium at the Muséum national d'histoire naturelle
- P, the ancient Greek author of the Hellenica Oxyrhynchia
- P, the production code for the 1965 Doctor Who serial The Crusade
- P (film), a 2005 Thai film
- "P" Is for Peril, a 2001 novel by Sue Grafton
- P, an abbreviation of Pinxit
- p or piano, a dynamic direction to play softly
- P, priestly source of the Hebrew Bible
- Agent P, the codename for Perry the Platypus in Phineas and Ferb

=== Music ===
- P (band), a 1993–95 American alternative rock band
  - P (album), the 1995 eponymous release by American alternative rock band P
- "P," a song from the Venetian Snares album Cavalcade of Glee and Dadaist Happy Hardcore Pom Poms
- "P", a song by American rapper Jaden from his 2019 album ERYS

== Computing ==
- P(), the usual name for the operation to acquire a semaphore
- <p>...</p>, the HTML element used to create a paragraph
- P-type semiconductor
- P (programming language), developed by Microsoft and UC, Berkeley
- Primitive programming language P′′
- p, a suffix unit for video resolution (vertical Progressive-scan lines), as in 720p or 1080p
- The P convention in communication

== Mathematics ==
- p-value, in statistical hypothesis testing
- P (complexity), a complexity class in computational complexity theory
- #P complexity class
- P, universal parabolic constant
- Pi
- P or $\mathbb{P}$ - the set of all primes and p an individual prime
- ℘-functions or p-functions, are the Weierstrass elliptic function
- p-series, a common name for the Harmonic series (mathematics)
- P, Projective space

== Money, corporate ==
- P (instead of ₱), a symbol often used for the Philippine peso
- p is a symbol for penny
- P, the New York Stock Exchange ticker symbol for Pandora Media, Inc., the corporate owner of Pandora Radio
- P, Panasonic's mobile phones in Japan
- Railpower Technologies (TSX: P), a Canadian company that builds environmentally friendly hybrid yard locomotives
- Everpure (NYSE symbol P)

== Science ==
- p, the symbol for momentum in physics
- P, the symbol for power (physics)
- P, the symbol for proposition
- Pulse, the rate of heartbeats
- °P, the unit in descriptions of alcohol proof
- Poise, the unit for dynamic viscosity in the centimetre gram second system of units
- Phosphorus, symbol P, a chemical element
- p, the symbol for pressure
- p, the SI prefix symbol for pico-, 10^{−12}
- P, the SI prefix symbol for Peta-, 10^{15}
- p, approximates the negative common logarithm (base 10) in pH, the measure of acidity or basicity
- Haplogroup P (mtDNA), a human mitochondrial DNA (mtDNA) haplogroup
- Haplogroup P (Y-DNA), a Y-chromosomal DNA (Y-DNA) haplogroup
- Methamphetamine, nicknamed "P" in New Zealand
- p designates the short arm of a chromosome
- ATC code P Antiparasitic products, insecticides and repellents, a section of the Anatomical Therapeutic Chemical Classification System
- Proline, an amino acid abbreviated P or Pro
- P-factor, an aerodynamic effect
- p factor (psychopathology)

== Technology ==
- P-states, the CPU performance states

== Transportation ==
- Transilien Line P, a line of the Paris transport network
- P (Los Angeles Railway)
- The official West Japan Railway Company service symbol for:
  - Sakurajima Line.
  - Geibi Line.
- Nankō Port Town Line, an automated guideway line operated by the Osaka Metro, labeled
- Bondowoso, Situbondo, Jember and Banyuwangi (vehicle registration prefix P)

== Other uses ==
- Papa, the military time zone code for UTC−03:00

== See also ==
- Pea (disambiguation)
- Pee (disambiguation)
- Rho (disambiguation)
- P. (disambiguation)
