= P2 =

P2, P02, P.2, or P-2 might refer to several subjects:

== Technology ==
- P2 (storage media), a "Professional Plug-in" solid state data storage technology employed by Panasonic
- DSC-P2, a Sony Cyber-shot P series camera model
- Honda P2, a 1996 Honda P series of robots, an ASIMO predecessor
- Intel 80286, 2nd generation processor architecture
- Pentium II, 6th generation Intel central processing unit
- Samsung P2, a 2007 flash memory based Yepp portable media player
- P2 audio connector, see Phone connector (audio)

== Science ==
- Bacteriophage P2, a temperate phage of the family Myoviridae that infects E. coli
- P2 laboratory, biosafety-level-2 laboratory
- P2 receptor, a purinergic and pyrimidinergic cell surface receptor
- P2, a pulmonic valve closure sound
- Nix (moon) (former designation P2), a moon of Pluto
- P200 or P2, a component of brain evoked-response potential
- ATC code P02 Anthelmintics, a subgroup of the Anatomical Therapeutic Chemical Classification System
- Buffer P2, a lysis buffer solution
- Period 2, of the periodic table
- Pollution prevention in the US, an environmental management strategy emphasizing avoiding waste rather than treating it
- Diphosphorus (P_{2}), an inorganic chemical
- SARS-CoV-2 Zeta variant, one of the variants of SARS-CoV-2, the virus that causes COVID-19
- P2 (space group), three-dimensional space group no. 3

== Transportation ==
- P2 transport, a World War II passenger ship/troop ship design of the United States Maritime Commission
- P2, a State 1st class road in Latvia
- LNER Class P2, a class of 6 British 2-8-2 locomotives designed by Sir Nigel Gresley

=== Aircraft ===
- P-2 Hawk, a variant of the 1923 P-1 Hawk biplane fighter of the United States Army Air Corps
- P-2 Neptune, known as "P2V Neptune" until 1962, a United States Navy maritime patrol and antisubmarine warfare aircraft introduced in 1947
- Piaggio P.2, a 1923 Italian fighter prototype
- Pilatus P-2, a Swiss Air Force trainer aircraft in service from 1946 to 1981
- Polikarpov P-2, a Soviet Polikarpov biplane trainer prototype

=== Automobiles ===
- Alfa Romeo P2, an iconic 1920s racing automobile
- Prodrive P2, an automobile built by Prodrive
- Volvo P2 platform, an automobile platform

== Entertainment ==
- P2 (film), a 2007 suspense/thriller film directed by Franck Khalfoun
- P2 virus, a fictional virus in the novel The Second Angel
- DR P2, a Danish radio channel playing classical music and jazz, literary programming and radio dramas
- NRK P2, a Norwegian radio channel playing cultural programming operated by Norsk rikskringkasting
- Sveriges Radio P2, a Swedish radio channel playing classical music, jazz and world music operated by Sveriges Radio
- Persona 2, 1999 and 2000 role-playing video games by Atlus
- Portal 2, a 2011 puzzle-platform video game by Valve
- Postal 2, a 2003 first-person shooter by Running with Scissors
- "P2" (song), a 2020 song by Lil Uzi Vert from the album Eternal Atake

== Other uses ==
- P2 (panel building), a design for blocks of flats used in East Germany
- P-2 (mountain lion), a mountain lion in the Santa Monica Mountains
- Papyrus 2 (P^{2}, 𝔓^{2}), a papyrus New Testament manuscript
- Propaganda Due, an Italian Masonic lodge, legal 1945–76 and afterwards clandestine and conspiratorial

== See also ==
- 2P (disambiguation)
