= 2007–08 Australian region cyclone season =

Tropical cyclone season

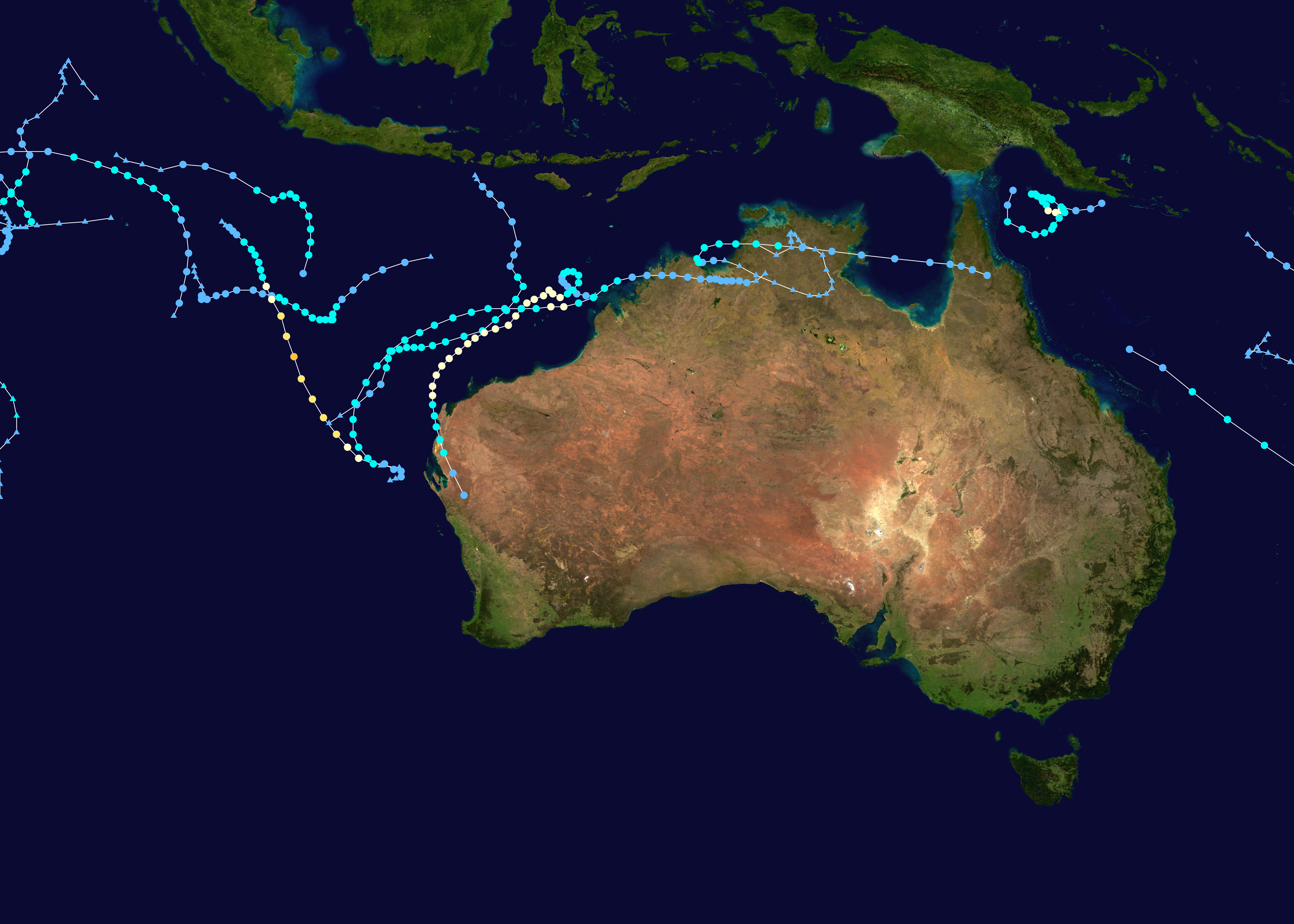
- Season summary map

Seasonal boundaries
- First system formed: 29 July 2007
- Last system dissipated: 26 April 2008

Strongest storm
- Name: Pancho
  - Maximum winds: 165 km/h (105 mph) (10-minute sustained)
  - Lowest pressure: 938 hPa (mbar)

Seasonal statistics
- Tropical lows: 14
- Tropical cyclones: 10
- Severe tropical cyclones: 3
- Total fatalities: 149
- Total damage: $93.8 million (2008 USD)

Related articles
- Timeline of the 2007–08 Australian region cyclone season; 2007–08 South-West Indian Ocean cyclone season; 2007–08 South Pacific cyclone season

The 2007–08 Australian region cyclone season was a slightly below-average tropical cyclone season. The season began with an early start, with the formation of the first tropical cyclone on 29 July, which was only recognized as a tropical cyclone during post-season analysis. This was the second time that a tropical cyclone had formed during July. The other one was Cyclone Lindsay in the 1996–1997 season. The next tropical cyclone that formed was Cyclone Guba, which formed on 13 November with TCWC Port Moresby assigning the name Guba on 14 November, which was the first named storm within TCWC Port Moresby's area of responsibility since Cyclone Epi in June 2003. Guba was also the first cyclone to occur in the Queensland region in November since 1977.

Tropical Cyclone Lee also formed on 13 November and was named by TCWC Perth on 14 November, with the system moving into RSMC Réunion's area of responsibility and being renamed Ariel. The next Cyclone to form within the Australian region was Melanie, which formed on 27 December and was named on the 28th by TCWC Perth. Melanie was the first storm of the season to require cyclone watches, and warnings were issued for the Pilbara coast, but it had weakened into a low-pressure area before it made landfall.

Tropical Cyclone Helen was the first tropical cyclone to form in 2008, in the Southern Hemisphere, forming in TCWC Darwin's area of responsibility. Helen marked the first time that Darwin had experienced a tropical cyclone since Cyclone Gretel in the 1984–85 season. Cyclone Nicholas made landfall north of Carnarvon on 20 February as a category one cyclone. Cyclone Ophelia actually formed in TCWC Darwin's area of responsibility, but had moved into TCWC Perth's area when it was named. Tropical Cyclone Pancho formed on 23 March to the south of Christmas Island, and was named by TCWC Perth on 25 March; the system eventually reached category 4 status, with winds of 95 kn (176 km/h).

In April 2008, Tropical Cyclones Rosie and Durga were the first tropical depressions to be monitored within TCWC Jakarta's area of responsibility and Durga was also the first storm to reach tropical cyclone status and named whilst being monitored by TCWC Jakarta. Durga was also the last storm of the season, which officially ended on 30 April.

== Systems ==
=== Tropical Cyclone 01U ===
- Category 1 tropical cyclone (Australian scale)
- Tropical storm (SSHWS)
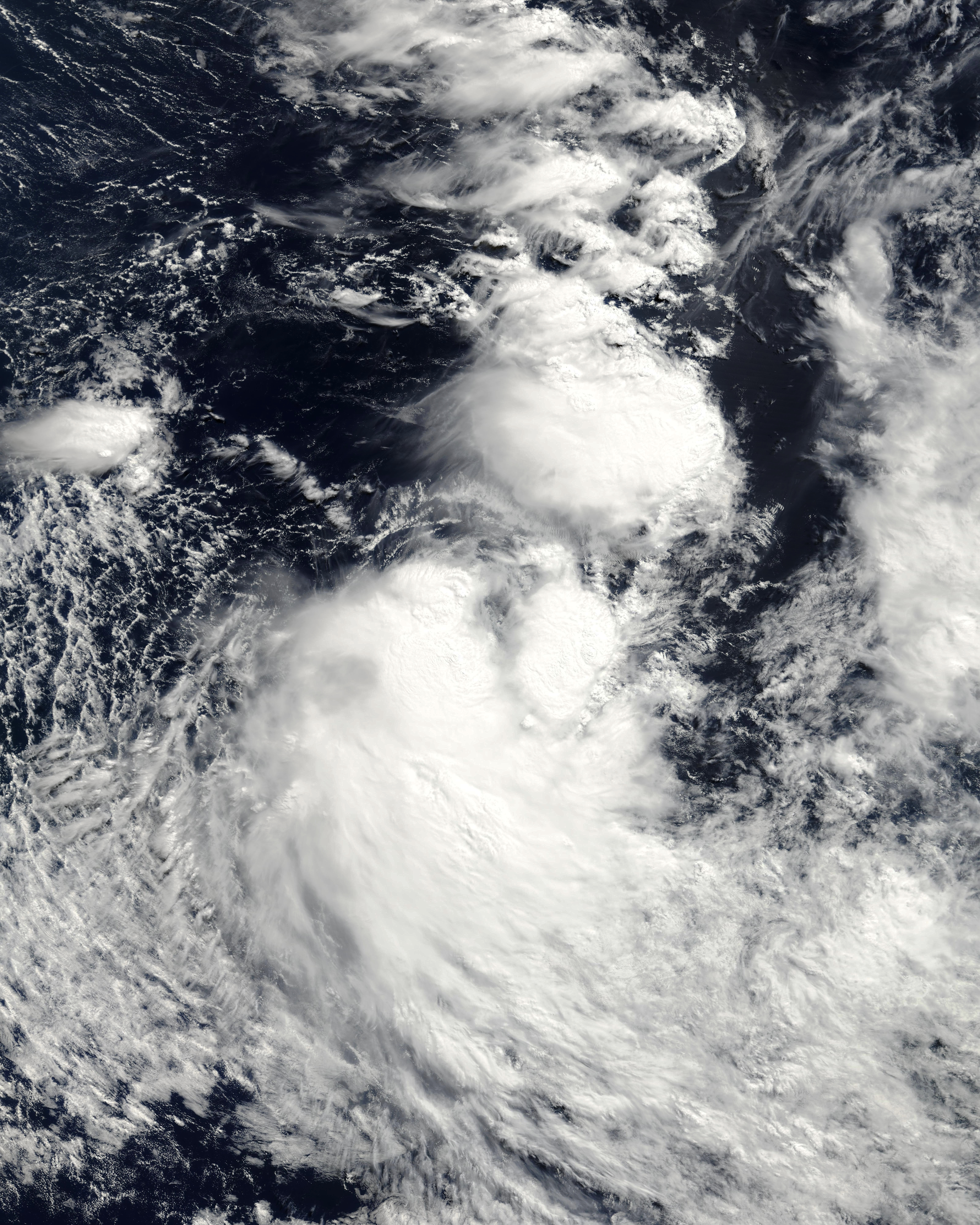
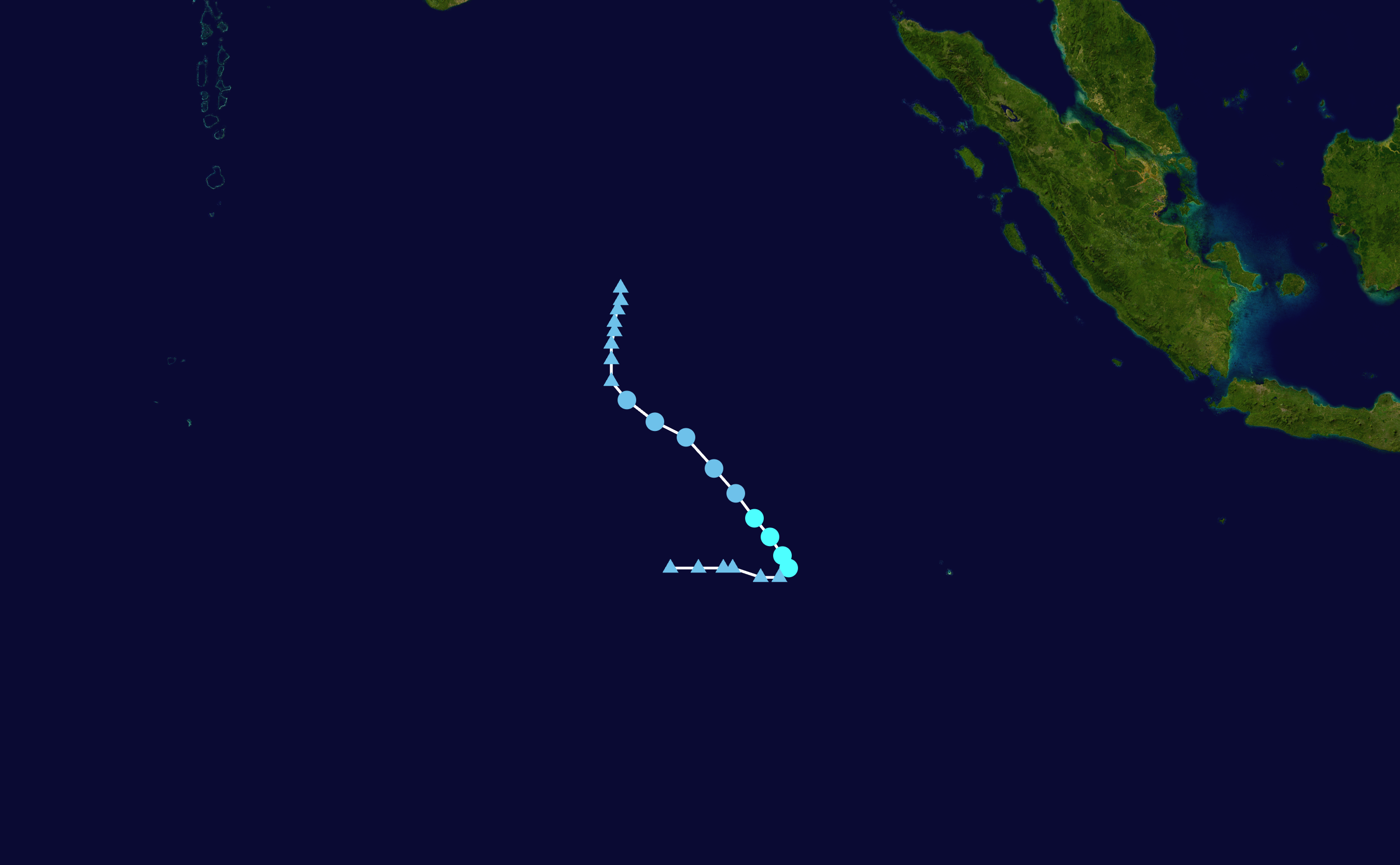
- Duration: 29 July (entered basin) – 1 August
- Peak intensity: 75 km/h (45 mph) (10-min); 992 hPa (mbar)

On 29 July, an area of low pressure, close to the edge of RSMC La Reunion's Area of responsibility, was designated as Tropical Disturbance 01R. However, this number was withdrawn in RSMC La Reunion's post–storm analysis. The JTWC issued a Tropical Cyclone Formation Alert (TCFA) on the developing system on 29 July, and initiated warnings on the tropical cyclone late that day, designating it as Tropical Cyclone 01S. However, by this time, the cyclone had crossed 90E and entered TCWC Perth's Area of Responsibility, which designated it as a Tropical Low and issued shipping warnings on the Tropical Low. Early on 30 July, the tropical cyclone began to dissipate, so the JTWC issued their final advisory on the system on that day. and the Bureau of Meteorology issued its last warning the next day.

During post–storm analysis, The Bureau of Meteorology upgraded the tropical low to a tropical cyclone in its post-storm analysis, with maximum 10-min sustained winds of 75 km/h (47 mph), based on QuikSCAT observations. The cyclone was estimated to have reached tropical cyclone intensity from 29 to 30 July.

The tropical cyclone is the second on record to exist in the Western Australian region in July, the first being Cyclone Lindsay in 1996.

=== Tropical Cyclone Lee–Ariel ===
- Category 2 tropical cyclone (Australian scale)
- Tropical storm (SSHWS)
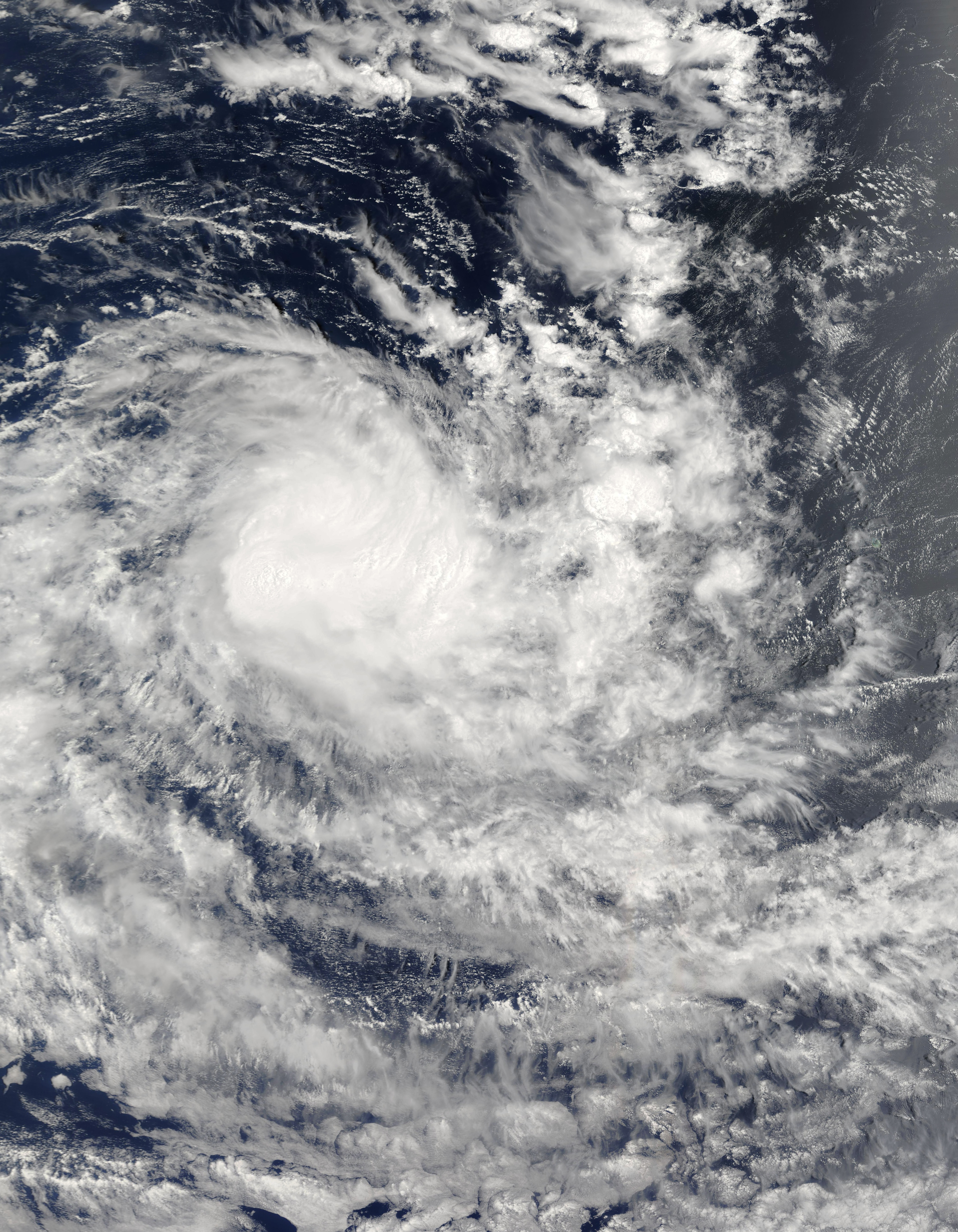
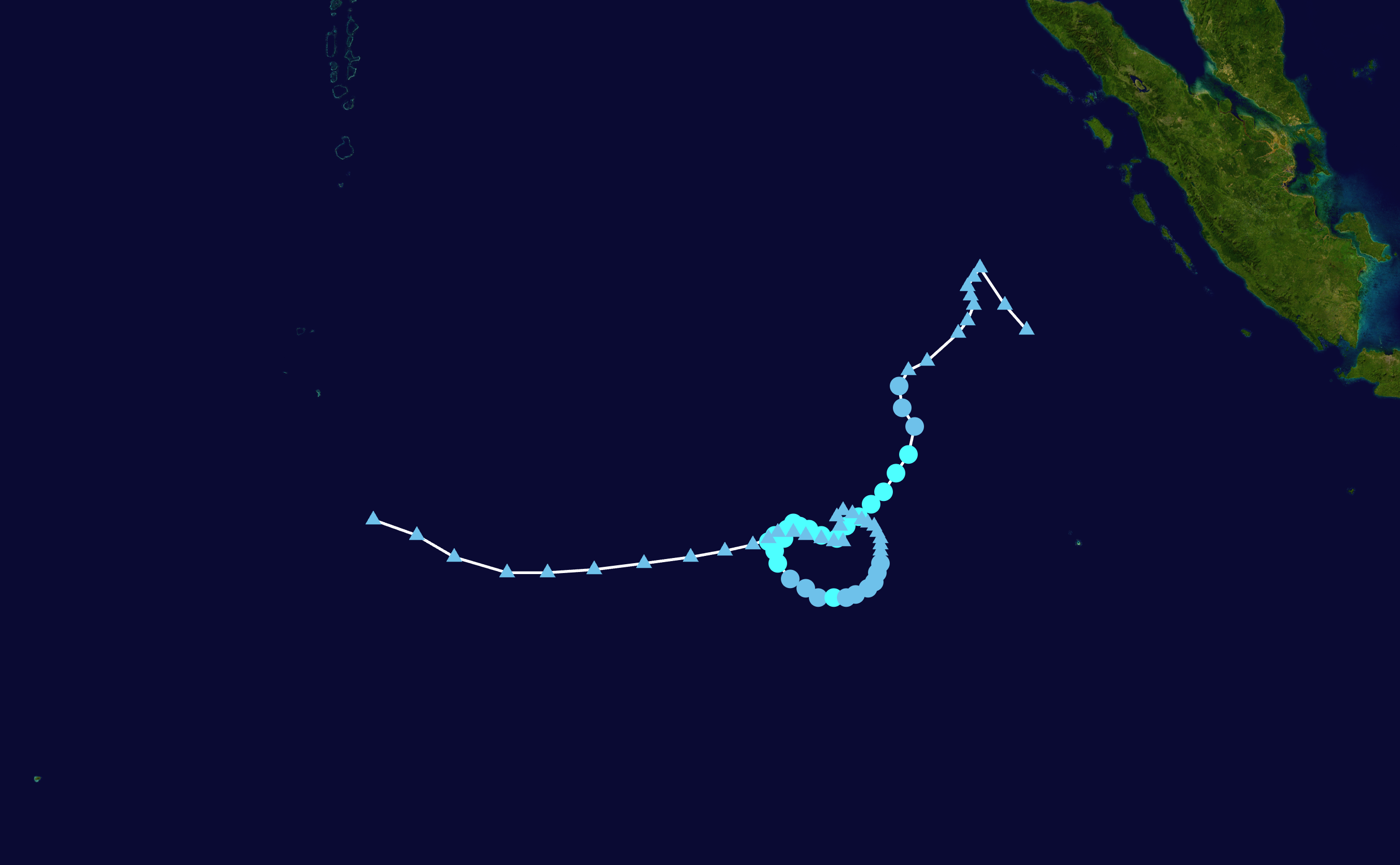
- Duration: 11 November – 15 November (Exited basin)
- Peak intensity: 95 km/h (60 mph) (10-min); 984 hPa (mbar)

On 13 November, the Tropical Cyclone Warning Centre (TCWC) in Perth began issuing warnings on a developing tropical low that was located within the area of responsibility of TCWC Jakarta. On 14 November, TCWC Perth upgraded the tropical low to tropical cyclone status and assigned it the name Lee, while the cyclone was still in TCWC Jakarta's area of responsibility. Later that day, the Joint Typhoon Warning Center (JTWC) issued a Tropical Cyclone Formation Alert on Tropical Cyclone Lee, and then designated the storm as Tropical Cyclone 03S shortly after. The TCWC in Perth upgraded Lee to category 2 on 15 November. Later that day, TCWC Perth issued its final advisory on Lee as it crossed west of 90°E, and the system was renamed Severe Tropical Storm Ariel by the Sub-Regional Tropical Cyclone Advisory Centre in Mauritius.

=== Severe Tropical Cyclone Guba ===
- Category 3 severe tropical cyclone (Australian scale)
- Category 1 tropical cyclone (SSHWS)
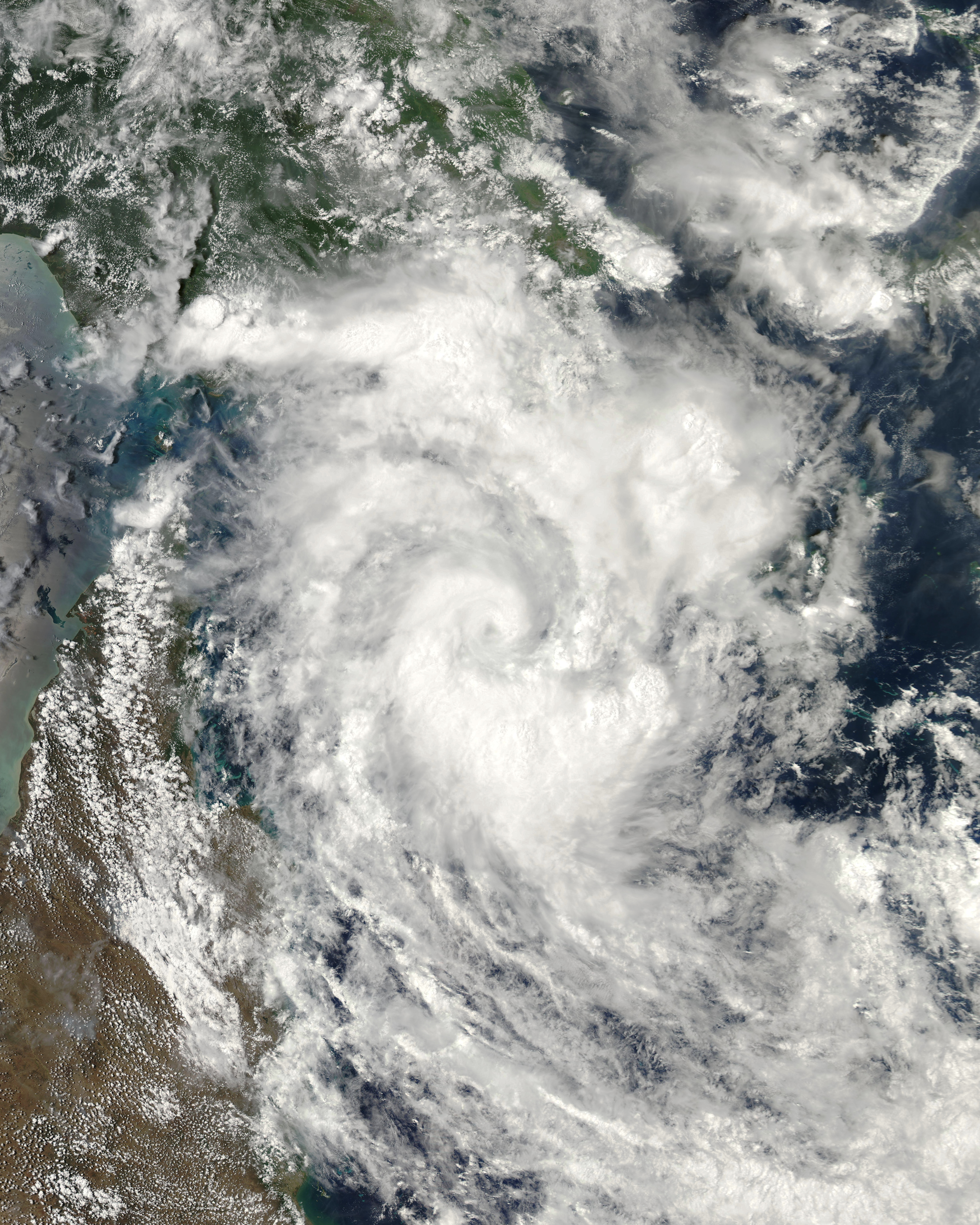
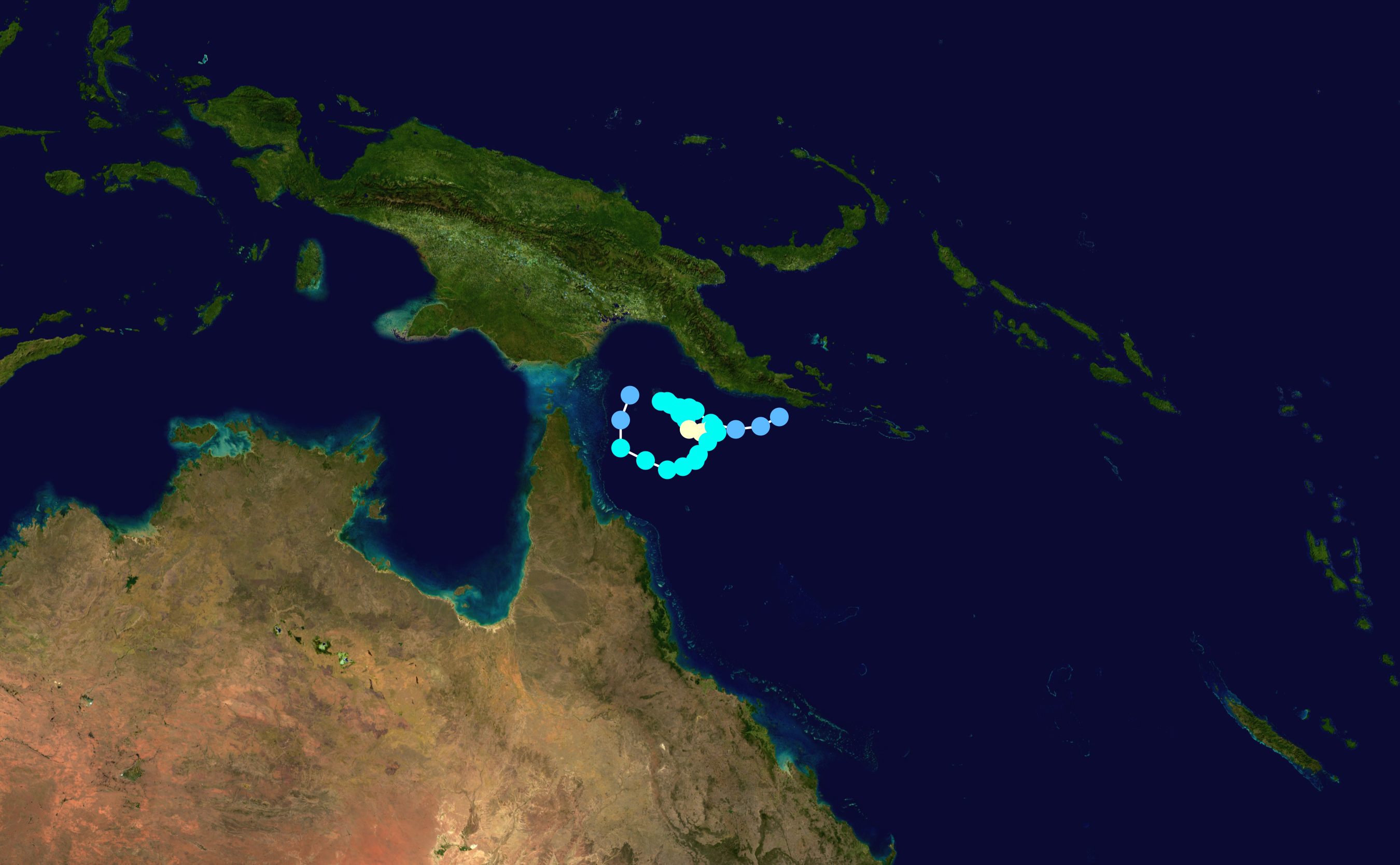
- Duration: 13 November – 20 November
- Peak intensity: 120 km/h (75 mph) (10-min); 971 hPa (mbar)

The Tropical Cyclone Warning Centre (TCWC) in Brisbane began issuing warnings on a developing tropical low which was located near the southern Papua New Guinea mainland on 13 November 2007, while the Joint Typhoon Warning Center (JTWC) issued a Tropical Cyclone Formation Alert on the storm. Later that day, the JTWC issued its first advisory, designating the low as Tropical Cyclone 02P. TCWC Brisbane initiated tropical cyclone advisories on the tropical low early on 14 November. Shortly after, TCWC Brisbane upgraded the system to Tropical Cyclone Guba, which was a name assigned by the TCWC in Port Moresby. Guba drifted erratically off the Queensland coast for the next two days, and intensified on 16 November, becoming a Category 3 severe tropical cyclone. Guba was a small, but intense system, forming a well-defined eye. Guba began weakening on 17 November as it started to accelerate to the west towards the Queensland coast. However, it later turned northwards, avoiding the Australian mainland, then north-east while it continued to weaken. TCWC Brisbane downgraded Guba below tropical cyclone strength, and issued its last advisory early on 20 November.

Flooding in Papua New Guinea led to at least 150 deaths. In the Oro Province, about 2,000 people were evacuated as a result of the flooding. Roads, bridges and 40 houses were washed away, as tides in the area reached two metres high. The provincial capital, Popondetta, had its water supply shut down, and Papua New Guinea's national airline, Air Niugini, suspended flights to Popondetta's main airport. The Rabaraba district in Milne Bay Province was also hit by flooding, with 30 houses and food gardens washed away, and forcing the evacuation of about 100 people. The government in Papua New Guinea reported that an estimated 145,000 people were affected from the flooding in Oro Province. Six days of torrential rain led to a damage total of 200 million kina (US$71.4 million). Guba was the first tropical cyclone to be assigned a name from Port Moresby's name lists since Tropical Cyclone Epi in 2003. It is the first cyclone to occur in the Queensland region in the month of November since 1977.

=== Tropical Low 04U (Dama) ===
- Tropical low (Australian scale)
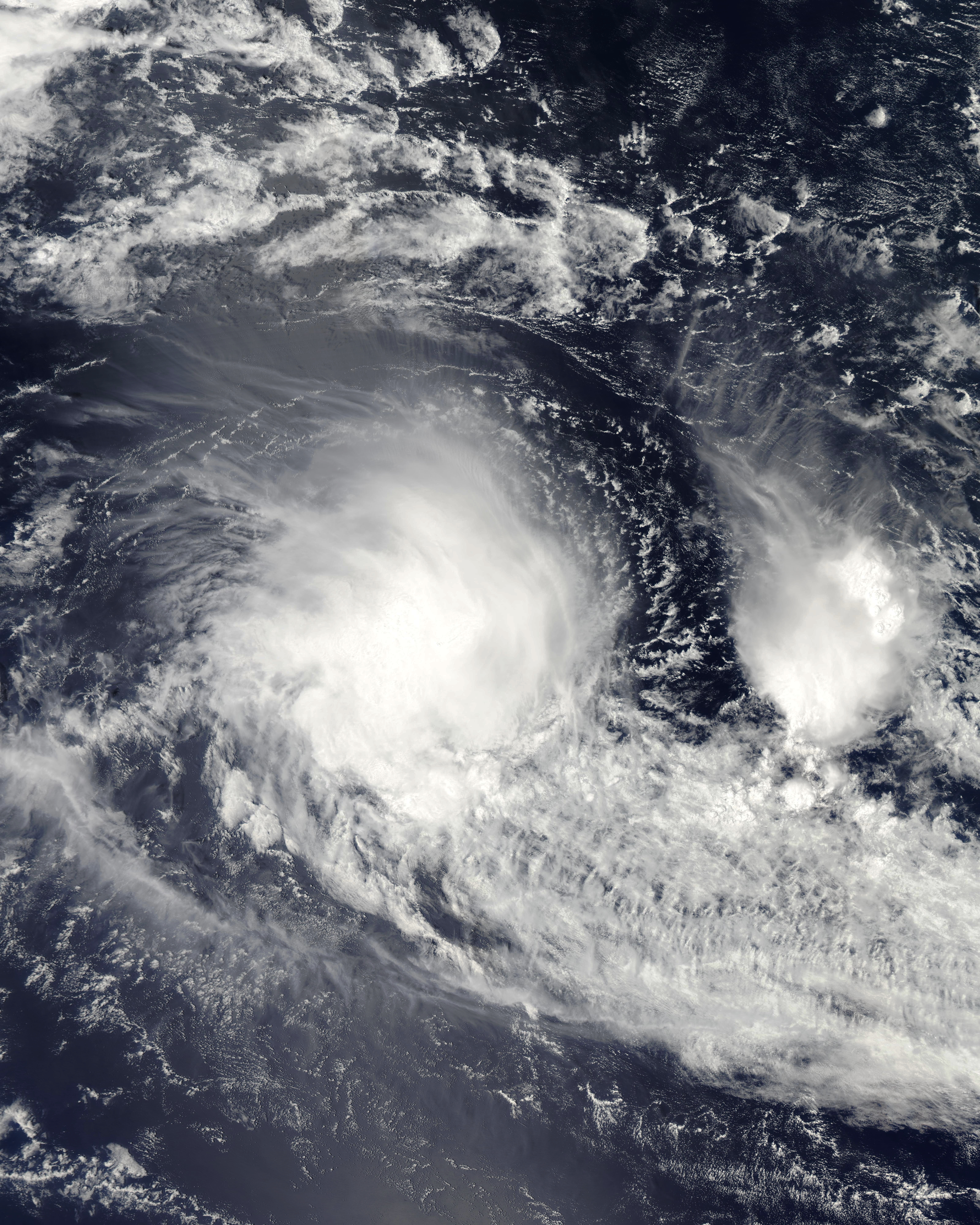
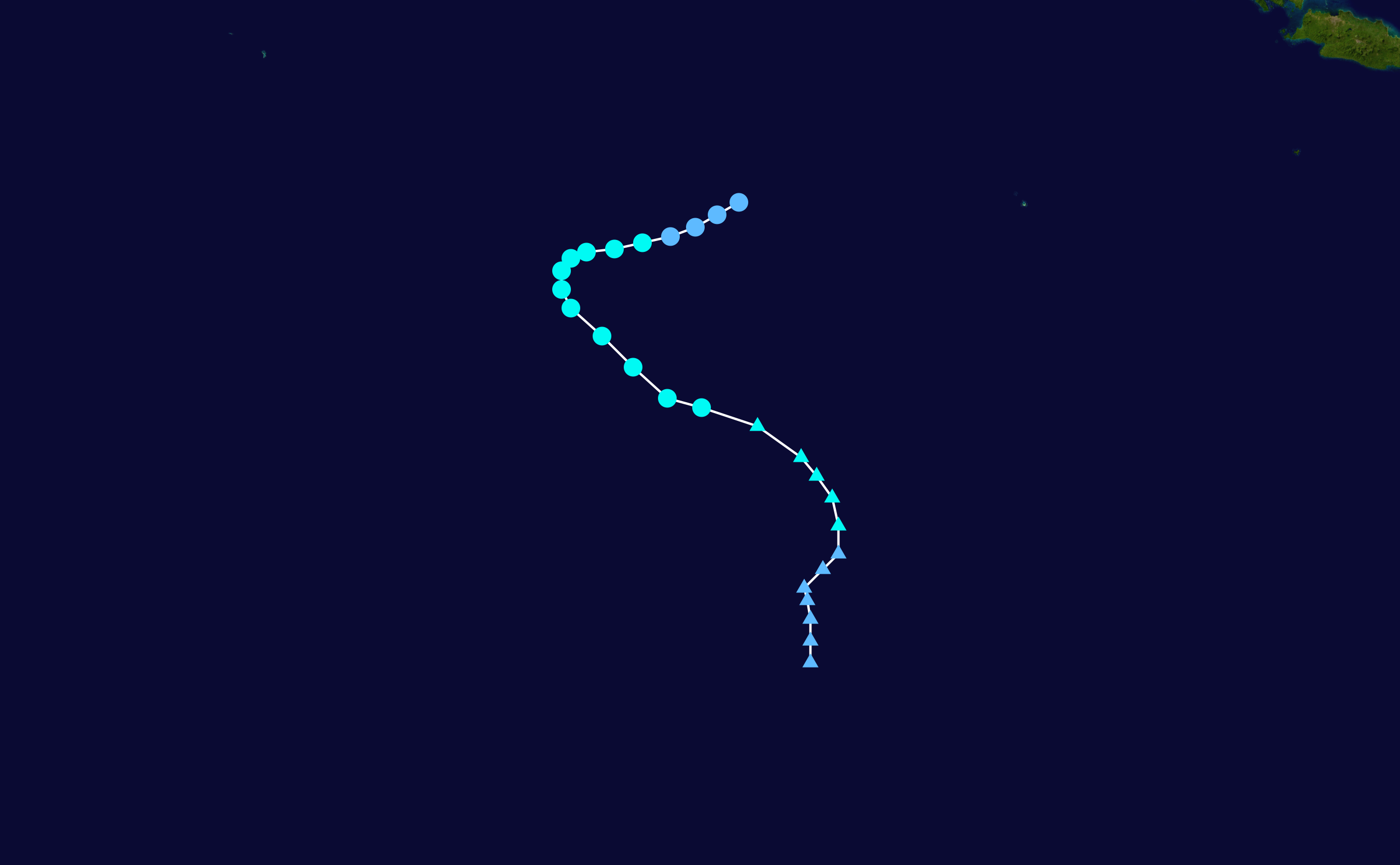
- Duration: 21 December – 22 December
- Peak intensity: 55 km/h (35 mph) (10-min); 998 hPa (mbar)

On 18 December, a Tropical Depression in the south-west Indian Ocean was named Moderate Tropical Storm Dama, monitored by Météo-France. The system then moved south-east, entering the area of responsibility of Perth's Tropical Cyclone Warning Centre, east of 90°E. The storm however, was not at Tropical Cyclone strength when it crossed the area, but was still a tropical depression, in which the Perth TCWC began issuing shipping warnings.

=== Tropical Cyclone Melanie ===
- Category 2 tropical cyclone (Australian scale)
- Tropical storm (SSHWS)
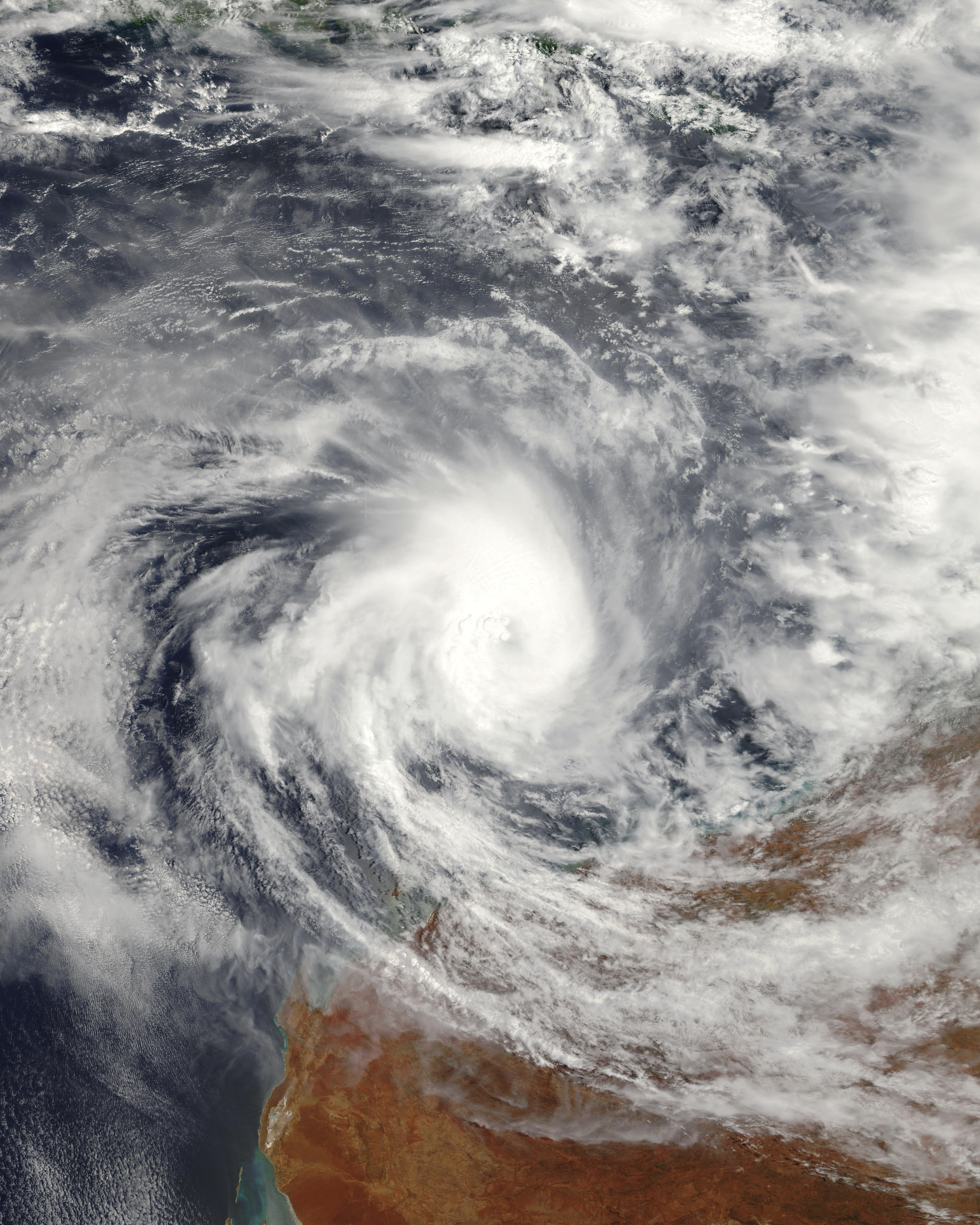
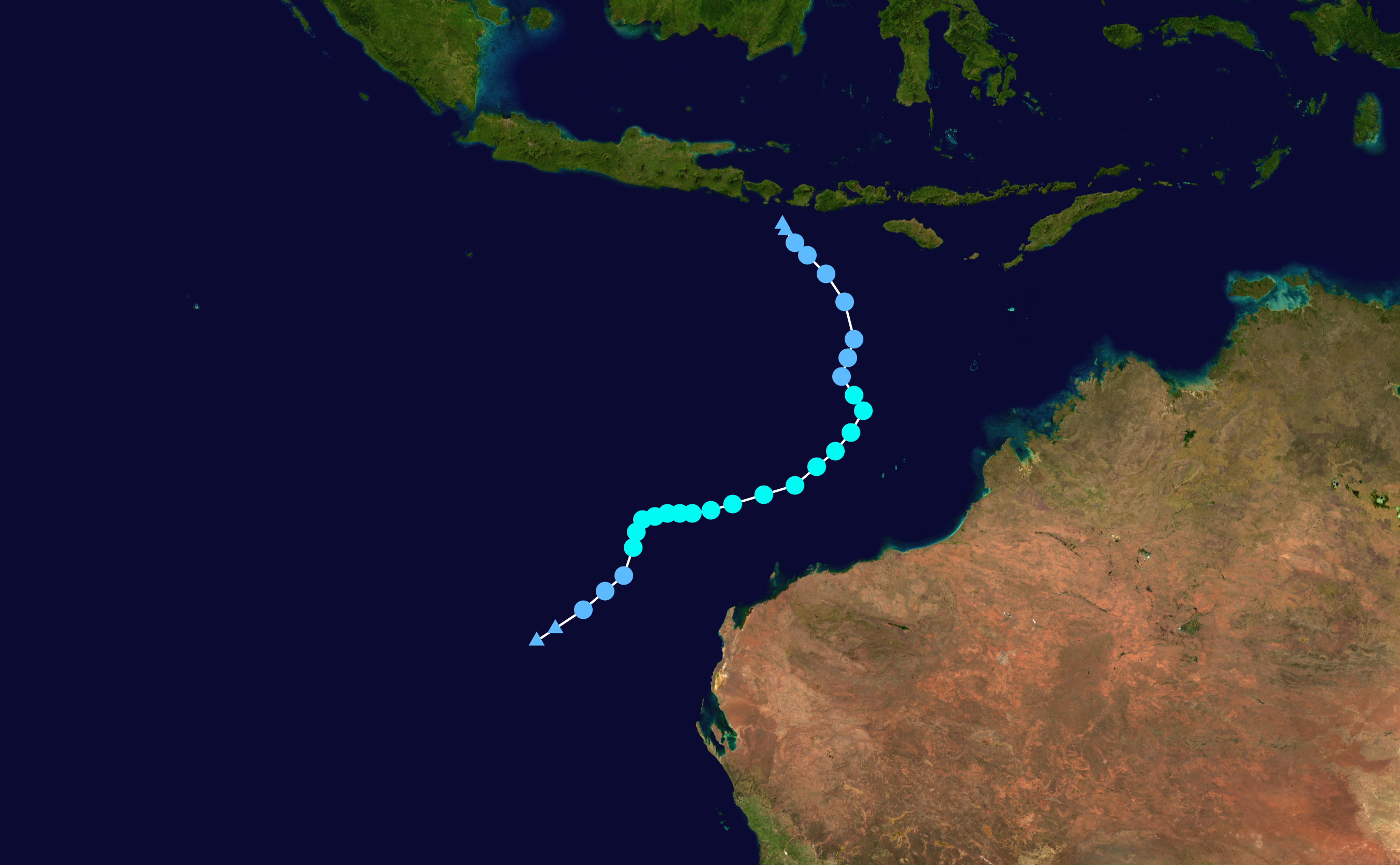
- Duration: 28 December – 2 January
- Peak intensity: 110 km/h (70 mph) (10-min); 962 hPa (mbar)

On 27 December, the Tropical Cyclone Warning Centre (TCWC) in Perth identified a Tropical Low near 11.2°S and 117.2°E, and began issuing shipping warnings for the developing system. Early on 28 December, the TCWC in Perth upgraded the tropical low to a tropical cyclone and named it Melanie. The cyclone moved southwards, then turned to the south-west on 29 December and strengthened to a Category 2 (Australian scale). Cyclone watches and warnings were issued for the Pilbara coast. On 30 December Melanie began to weaken and become less organised. Melanie continued to weaken and the system was downgraded to Category 1 status on 31 December. Continued weakening took place thereafter and it weakened below cyclone status early on 2 January, when the final advisory was issued.

=== Tropical Cyclone Helen ===
- Category 2 tropical cyclone (Australian scale)
- Tropical storm (SSHWS)
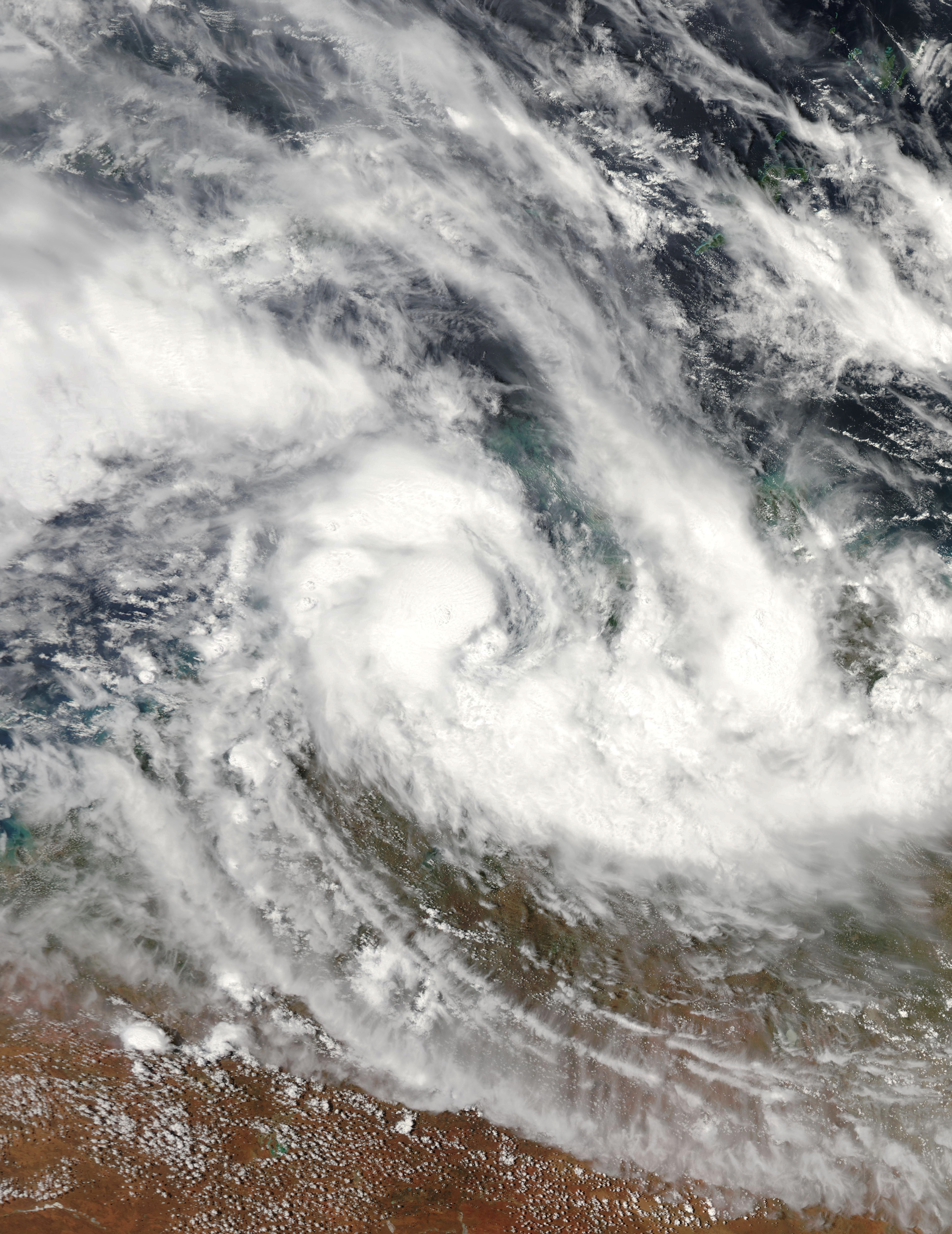
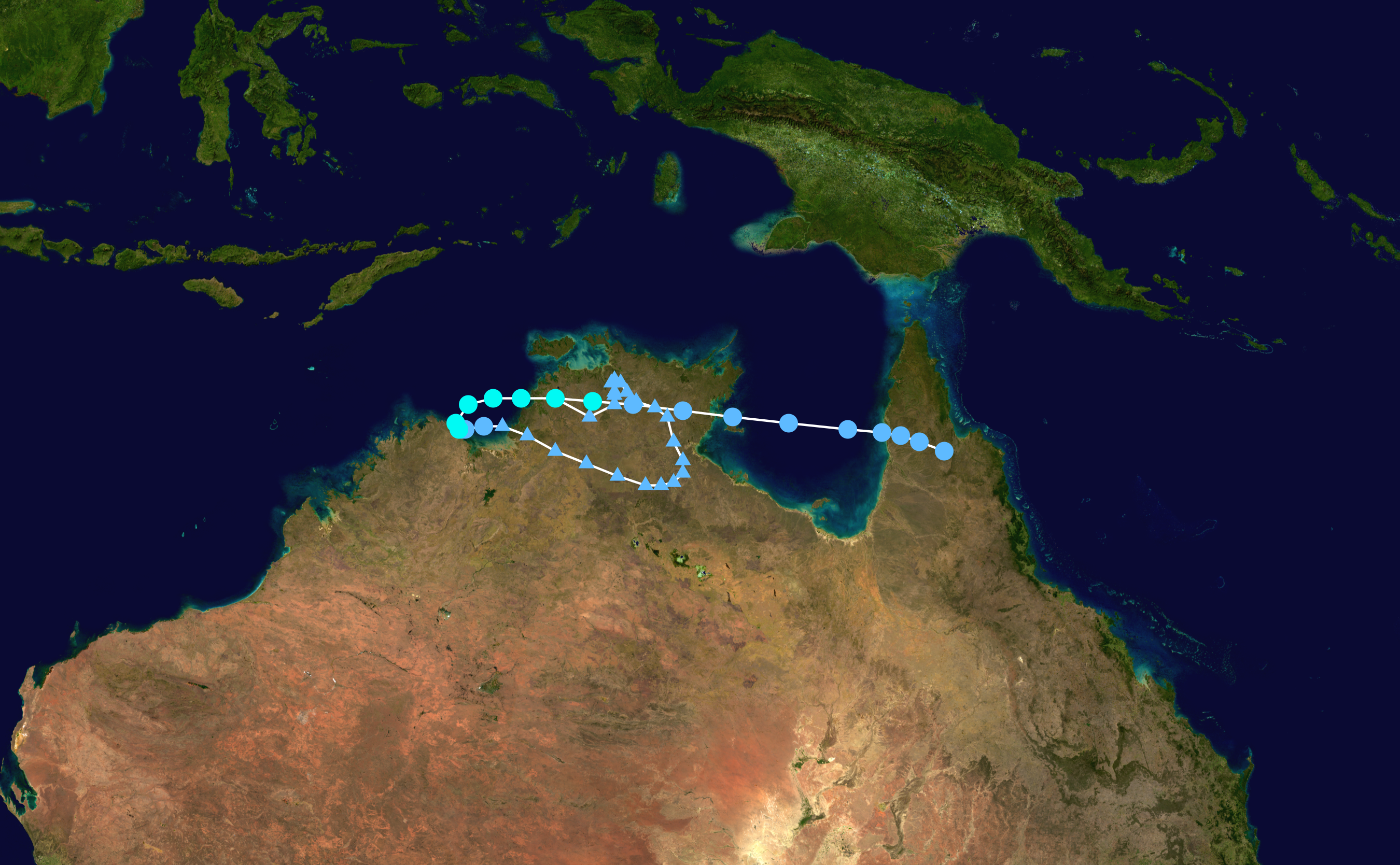
- Duration: 28 December – 6 January
- Peak intensity: 95 km/h (60 mph) (10-min); 975 hPa (mbar)

In late December a tropical low formed over the Top End which was slow moving in the eastern Top End on 29 December, which began moving west during 1 January at the base of the Top End. By the evening of 2 January the Tropical low moved into the Joseph Bonaparte Gulf. On 3 January at 11 am ACST (01:30 UTC) the TCWC in Darwin, Australia, located near the edge of their Area of Responsibility, with TCWC Perth, declared a Tropical Cyclone Warning for the coastal areas from Mitchell Plateau in Western Australia to the Daly River Mouth in Northern Territory with a Tropical Cyclone Watch declared for coastal areas from the Daly River Mouth to Goulburn Island which also included Darwin. Later that day a TCFA was issued by the JTWC who then upgraded the low to a Tropical Cyclone designating the cyclone 10S later that day. On 4 January at 8 am ACST (2230 UTC), TCWC Darwin upgraded the Tropical Cyclone Warning to include Darwin, by 11 am ACST (0103 UTC) the TCWC Darwin upgraded the Tropical low to Tropical Cyclone Helen which was located 380 km to the west/south west of Darwin moving towards the northeast. During the afternoon of 4 January Tropical Cyclone Helen was steadily moving towards the east to the Daly River Mouth region. At approximately 7 pm ACST (09:30 UTC) TCWC Darwin upgraded the intensity to 50 knots (Category 2), making landfall at Channel Point approximately 130 km southwest of Darwin at 10 pm ACST (12:30 UTC), It soon started to weaken due to interaction with land and it weakened into a tropical low on 5 January as it had become less organised. On 6 January the JTWC issued its final warning on Tropical Cyclone Helen, and then later that day TCWC Darwin followed suit and issued its final advisory on Tropical Low Ex-Helen as it approached TCWC Brisbane's Area of Responsibility.

The strongest wind gust recorded was at Charles Point Lighthouse with 120 kilometres an hour recorded during the Tropical Cyclone with Darwin Airport recording 102 kilometres an hour around 2 am ACST making it the first time since April 1985 for Darwin to experience Category 1 or more since Cyclone Gretel passed Darwin on 12 April 1985. Damages from the storm amounted to an estimated A$21.5 million (US$15 million).

=== Tropical Low 07U ===
- Tropical low (Australian scale)
- Duration: 31 December – 2 January
- Peak intensity: 55 km/h (35 mph) (10-min); 994 hPa (mbar)

On 31 December, the Tropical Cyclone Warning Centre (TCWC) in Perth identified a Tropical Low north north-west of the Cocos Islands, and began issuing shipping warnings. The low then moved south-west for the next few days, where it proceeded to enter an area of high vertical wind shear, and began to rapidly weaken. The TCWC issued its final shipping warning on 2 January.

=== Tropical Low 17S ===
- Tropical low (Australian scale)
- Tropical storm (SSHWS)
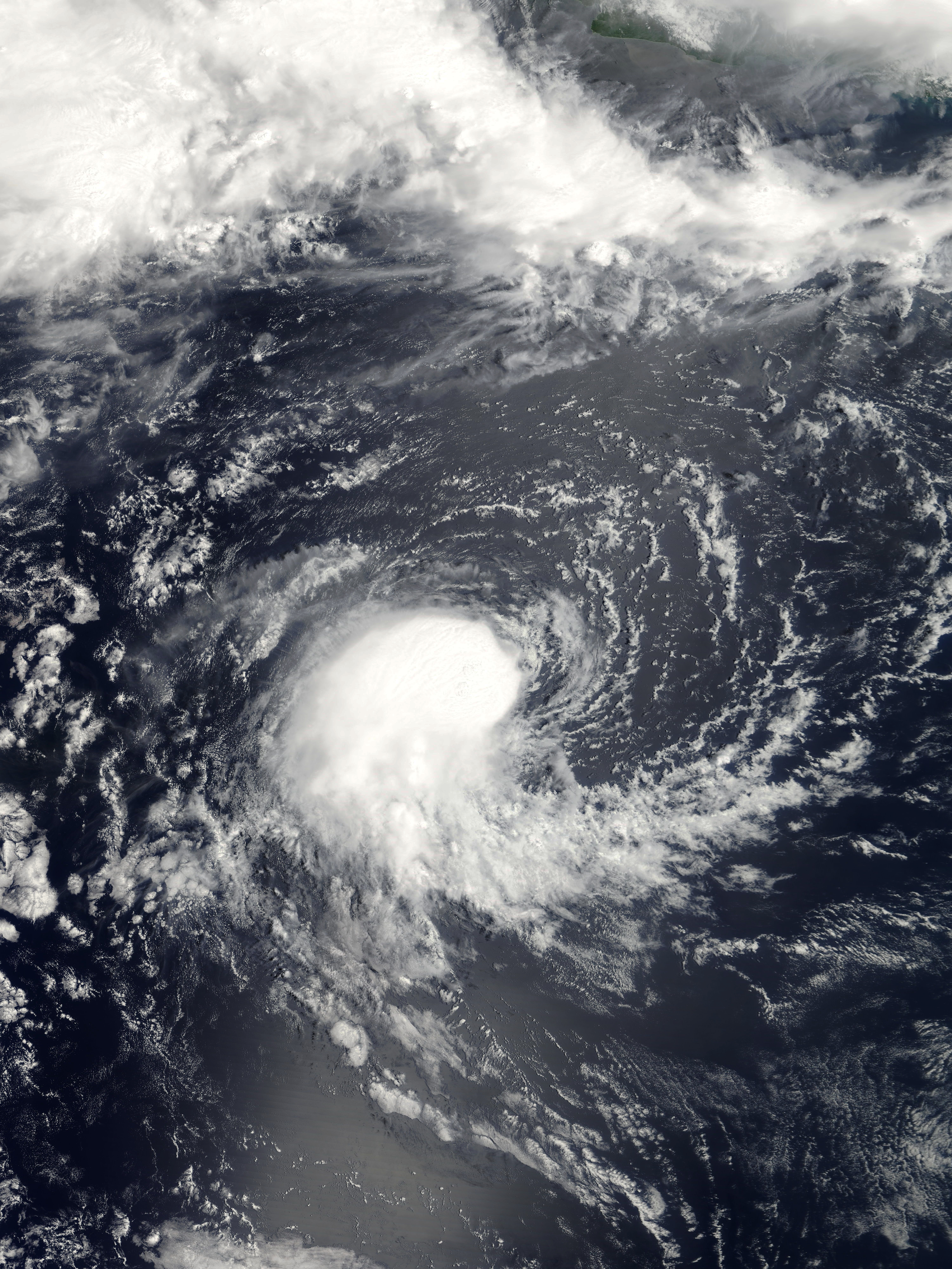
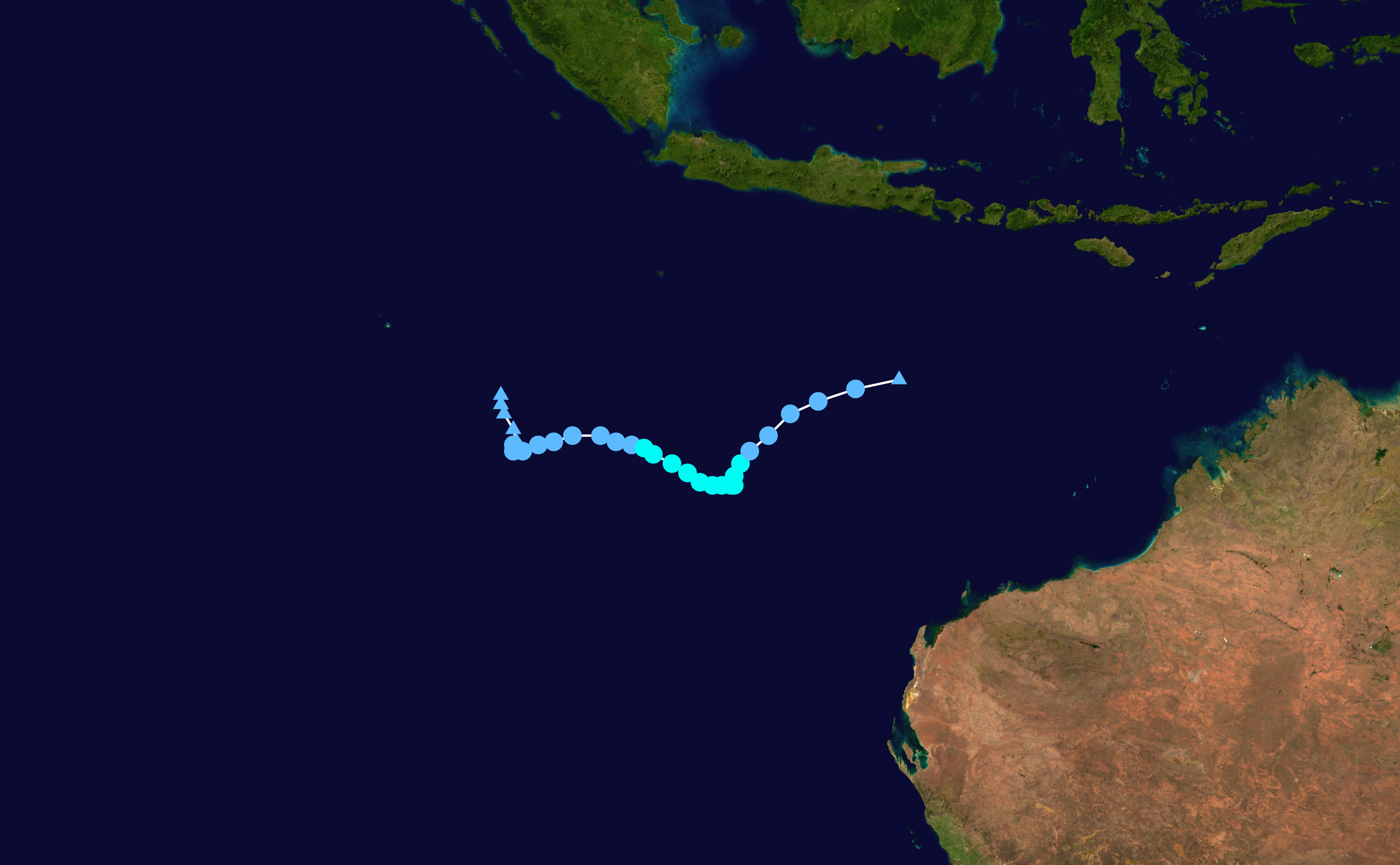
- Duration: 4 February – 10 February
- Peak intensity: 55 km/h (35 mph) (10-min); 990 hPa (mbar)

On 4 February, the Tropical Cyclone Warning Centre (TCWC) in Perth identified a Tropical Low South west of Christmas Island, and began issuing shipping warnings. Initially it was predicted that the system would intensify into a tropical cyclone but later on 4 February, the cyclone began to weaken with the final gale warnings being issued by TCWC Perth later that day. Over the next few days the system drifted eastwards and then on 6 February began showing signs of intensification. The following day, the Joint Typhoon Warning Center (JTWC) issued its first advisory, designating the low as Tropical Cyclone 17S. Later that day TCWC Perth reinstated Gale warnings on the tropical low. On 10 February The TCWC Perth and the JTWC issued their final advisories on the system.

=== Severe Tropical Cyclone Nicholas ===
- Category 3 severe tropical cyclone (Australian scale)
- Category 1 tropical cyclone (SSHWS)
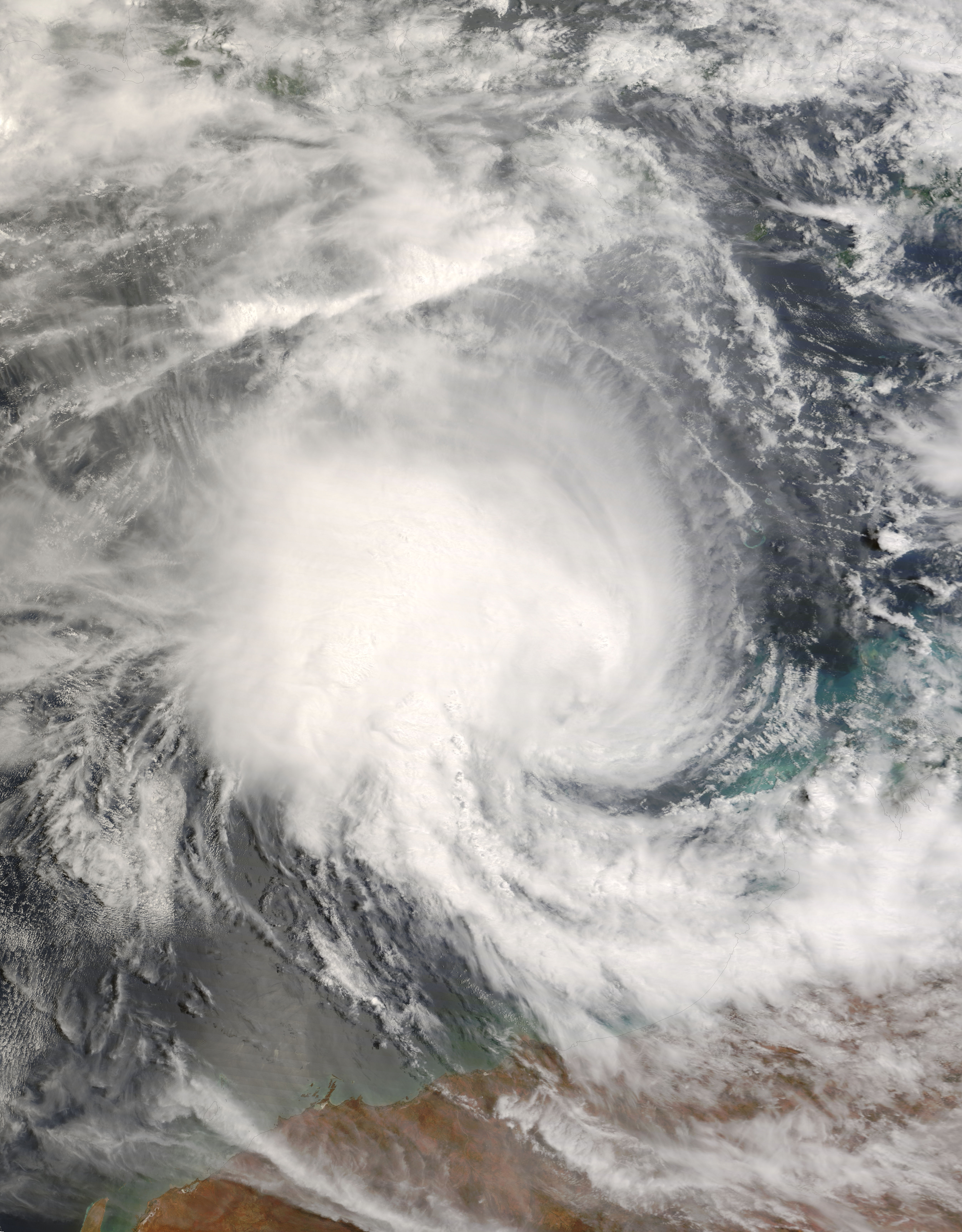
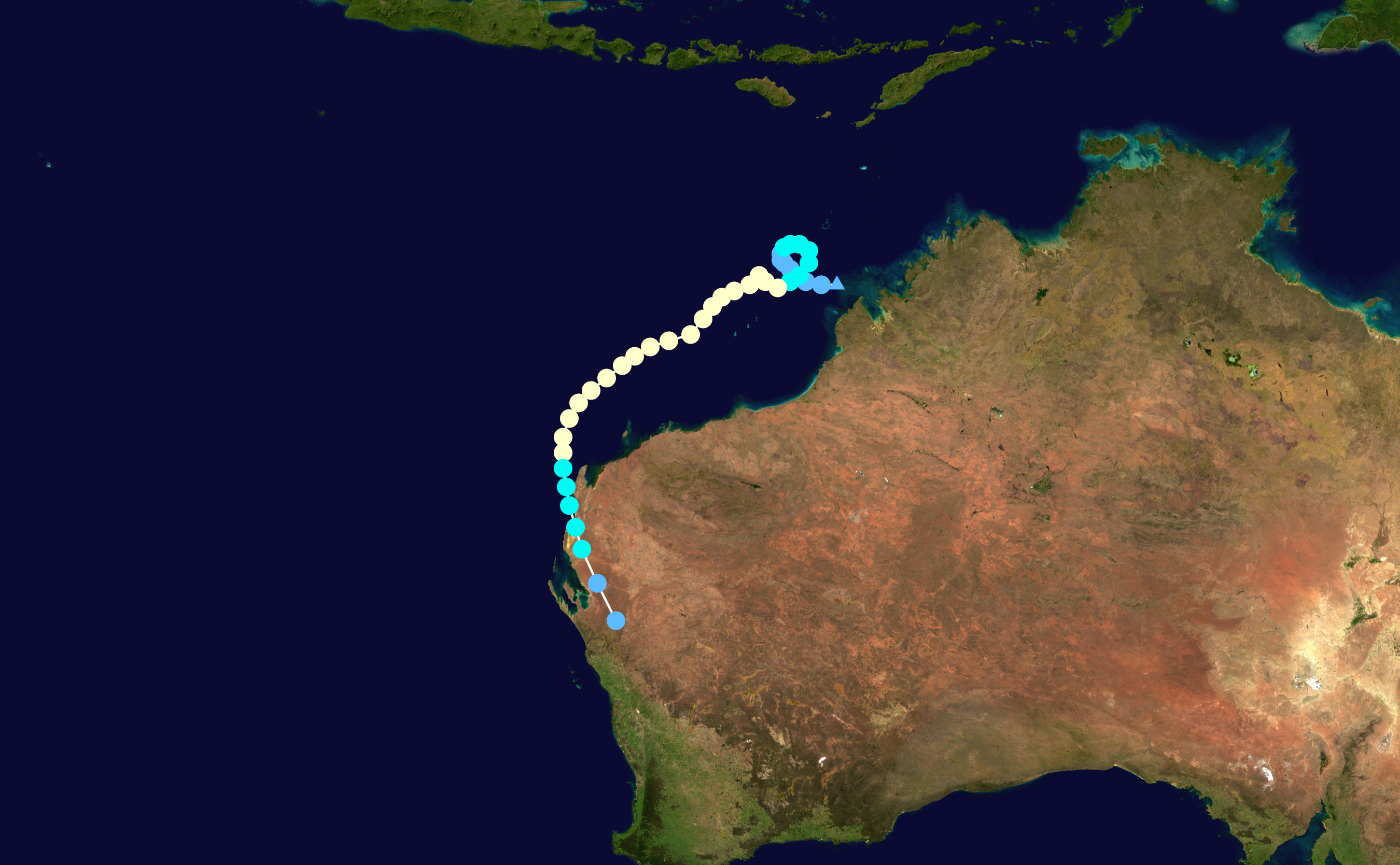
- Duration: 10 February – 20 February
- Peak intensity: 150 km/h (90 mph) (10-min); 948 hPa (mbar)

On 10 February, the Tropical Cyclone Warning Centre (TCWC) in Perth identified a Tropical Low near 16.0°S and 124.7°E, and began issuing tropical cyclone advisories on the system. On 12 February, the Joint Typhoon Warning Center (JTWC) issued a Tropical Cyclone Formation Alert on the developing system. Later in the day, the JTWC issued its first advisory, designating it as Tropical Cyclone 19S. Early on 13 February, the Tropical Cyclone Warning Centre in Perth upgraded the tropical low to a tropical cyclone and named it "Nicholas". On 16 February, Nicholas was upgraded to a Severe Tropical Cyclone, but it was downgraded back to a tropical cyclone on 18 February. Nicholas squirmed around Western Australia before finally making landfall north of Carnarvon on 20 February. Once inland, TCWC Perth discontinued advisories. The cyclone caused gales over the North West cape in Western Australia, and the town of Exmouth was on high alert.

=== Tropical Cyclone Ophelia ===
- Category 2 tropical cyclone (Australian scale)
- Category 1 tropical cyclone (SSHWS)
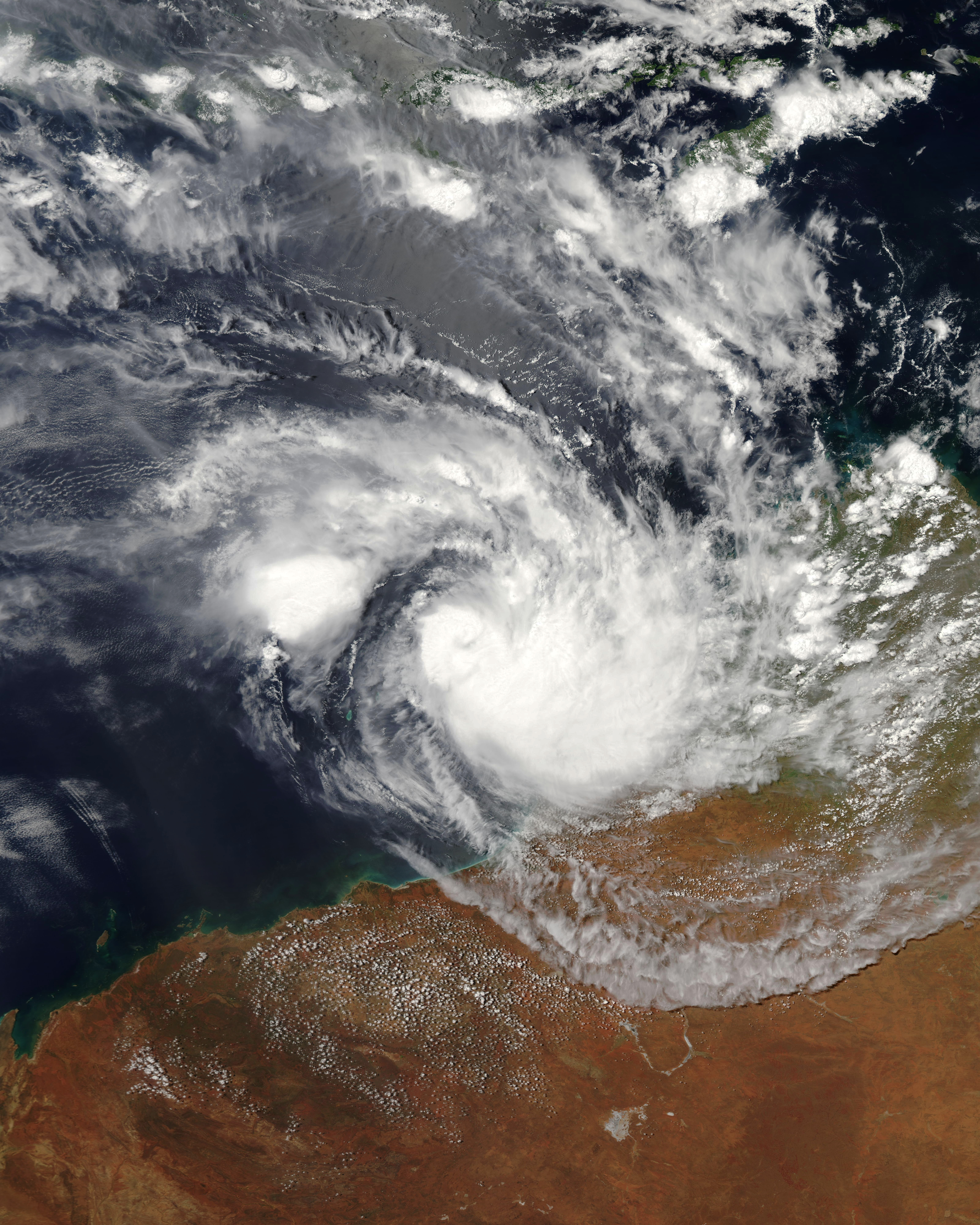
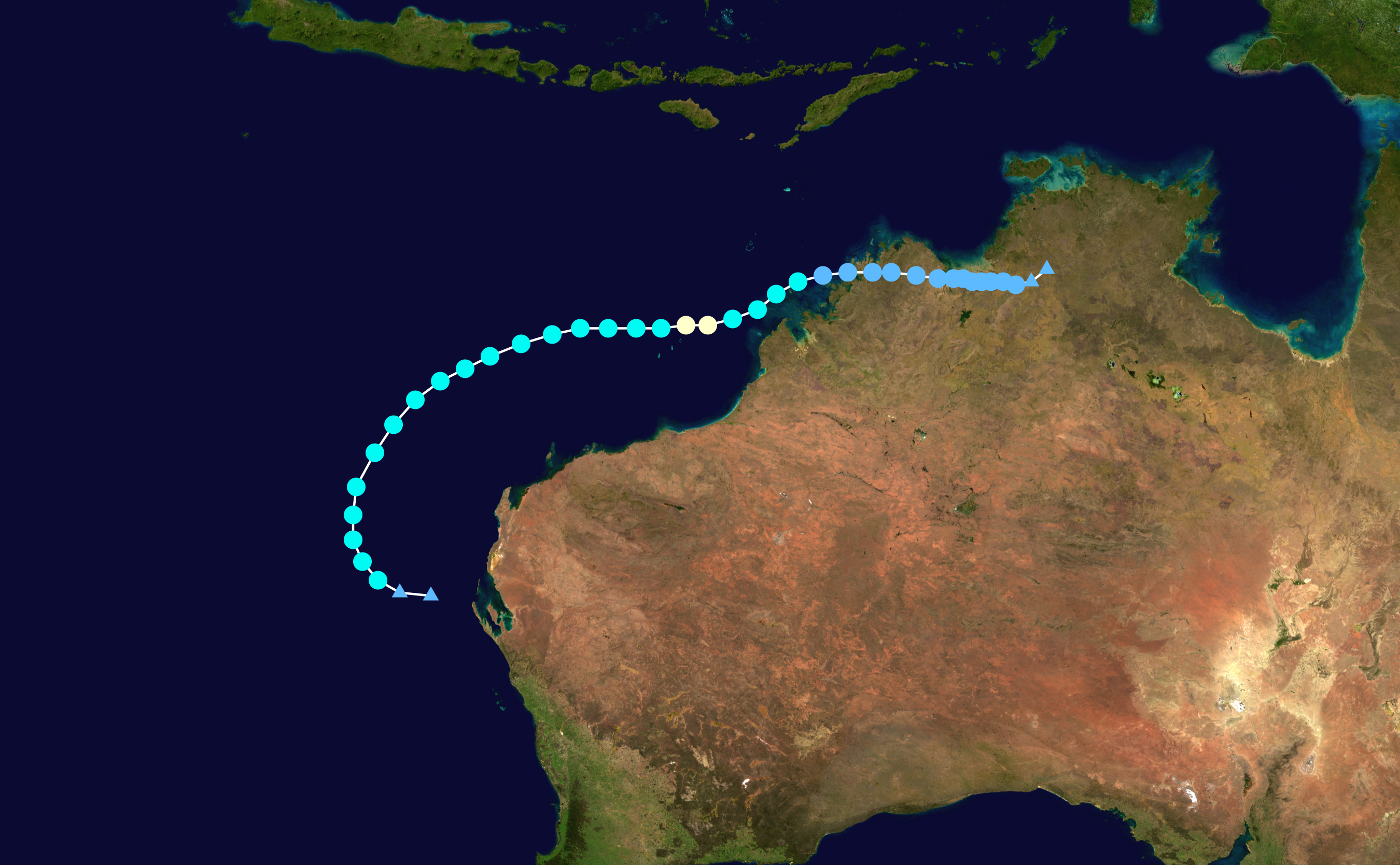
- Duration: 27 February – 7 March
- Peak intensity: 100 km/h (65 mph) (10-min); 985 hPa (mbar)

On 27 February 2008 the Tropical Cyclone Warning Centre (TCWC) in Darwin identified a Tropical Low near the Northern Territory, and began issuing tropical cyclone advisories on the system. On 29 February, the JTWC issued a Tropical Cyclone Formation Alert on the developing system. On 1 March, the JTWC issued their first warning on Tropical Cyclone 21S. The low moved into TCWC Perth's area of responsibility during the day. The low strengthened as it moved off the Kimberley coast, and was upgraded to Tropical Cyclone Ophelia by TCWC Perth. Ophelia intensified to a Category 2 cyclone on the Australian scale early on 2 March. The JTWC briefly upgraded Ophelia to a Category 1 cyclone on the Saffir–Simpson scale later that day, but was downgraded to a tropical storm on the next advisory. Ophelia continued on a general south-westerly track parallel to the coast, and eventually weakened out to sea as TCWC Perth discontinued advisories.

=== Tropical Low 20P ===
- Tropical low (Australian scale)
- Tropical storm (SSHWS)
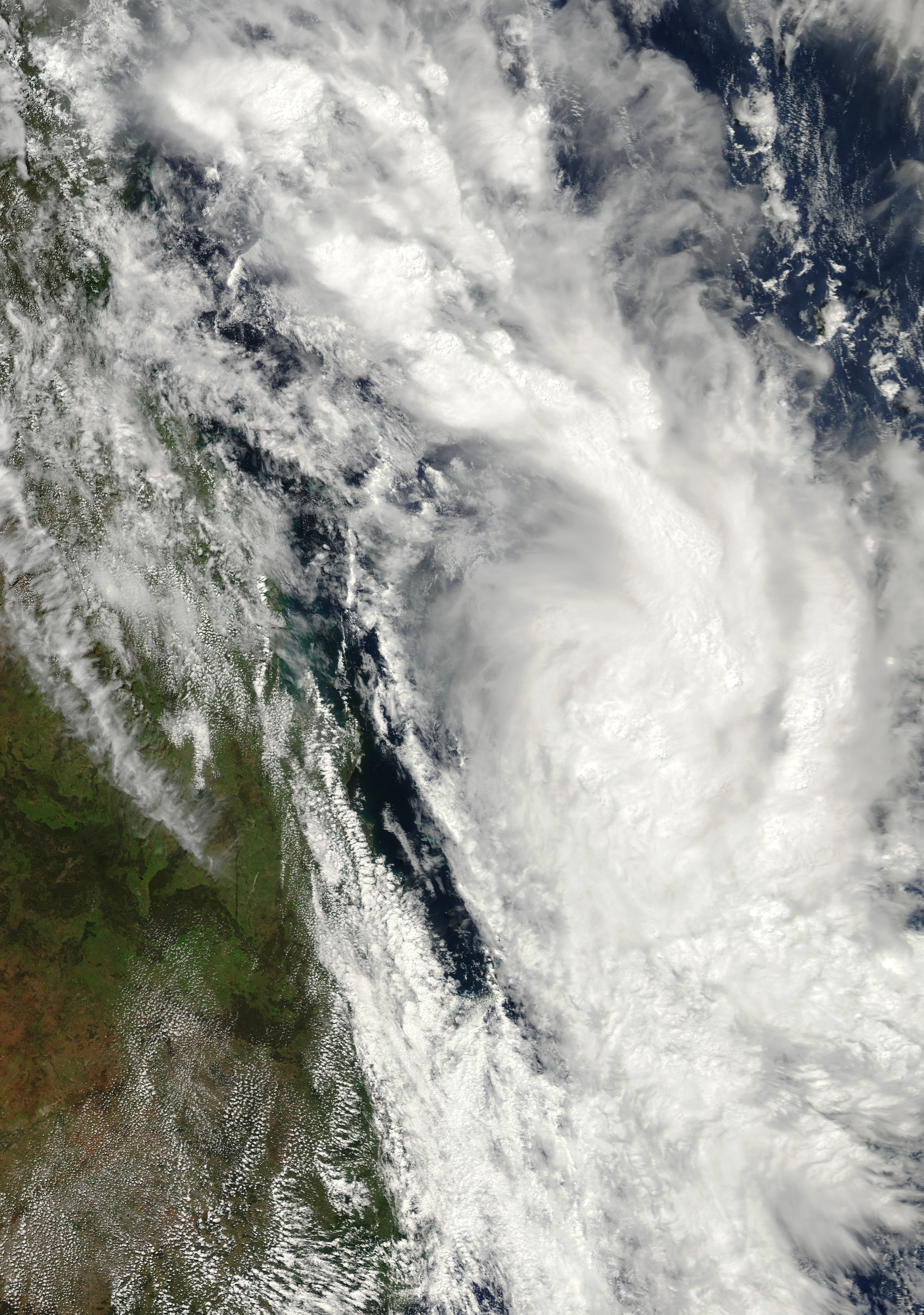
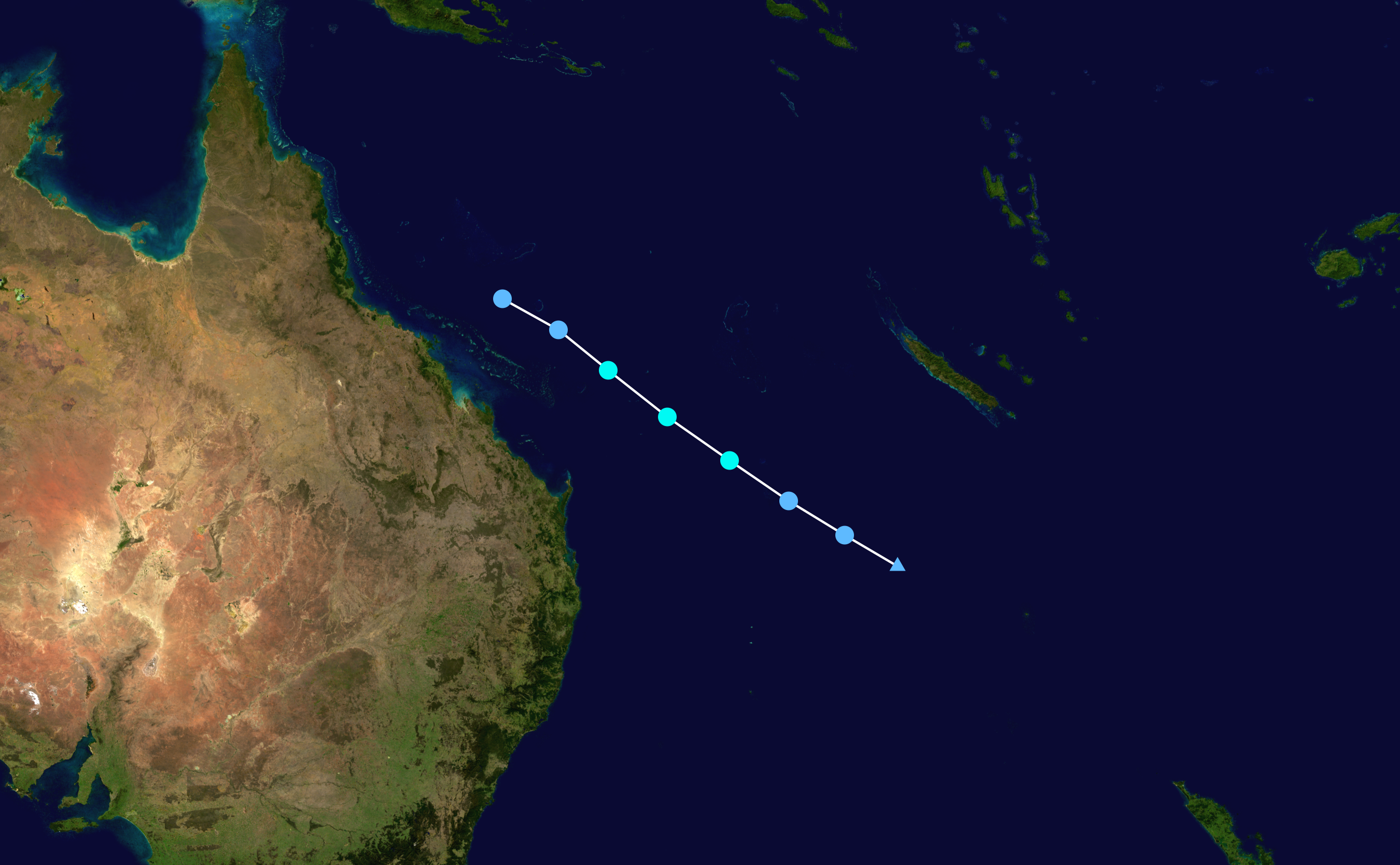
- Duration: 29 February – 29 February
- Peak intensity: 55 km/h (35 mph) (10-min); 999 hPa (mbar)

Early on 28 February, Tropical Cyclone Warning Center Brisbane identified a Tropical low which was located about 100 nmi (190 km) north-east of Townsville, Queensland and started issuing Gale Warnings on the low Later that day the Joint Typhoon Warning Center (JTWC) issued a Tropical Cyclone Formation Alert on this tropical low which was located north-east of Australia. The next day, the JTWC issued its first advisory on the Tropical Low designating it as Tropical Cyclone 20P. Later that day, the JTWC issued its final advisory on the system noting the storm was becoming extratropical. However TCWC Brisbane continued to issue warnings on this Tropical Low as it approached the edge of Brisbane's Area off responsibility. On 1 March TCWC Brisbane issued its final Gale warning for the northern region as the Low moved into TCWC Wellingtons Area of responsibility.

=== Severe Tropical Cyclone Pancho ===
- Category 4 severe tropical cyclone (Australian scale)
- Category 3 tropical cyclone (SSHWS)
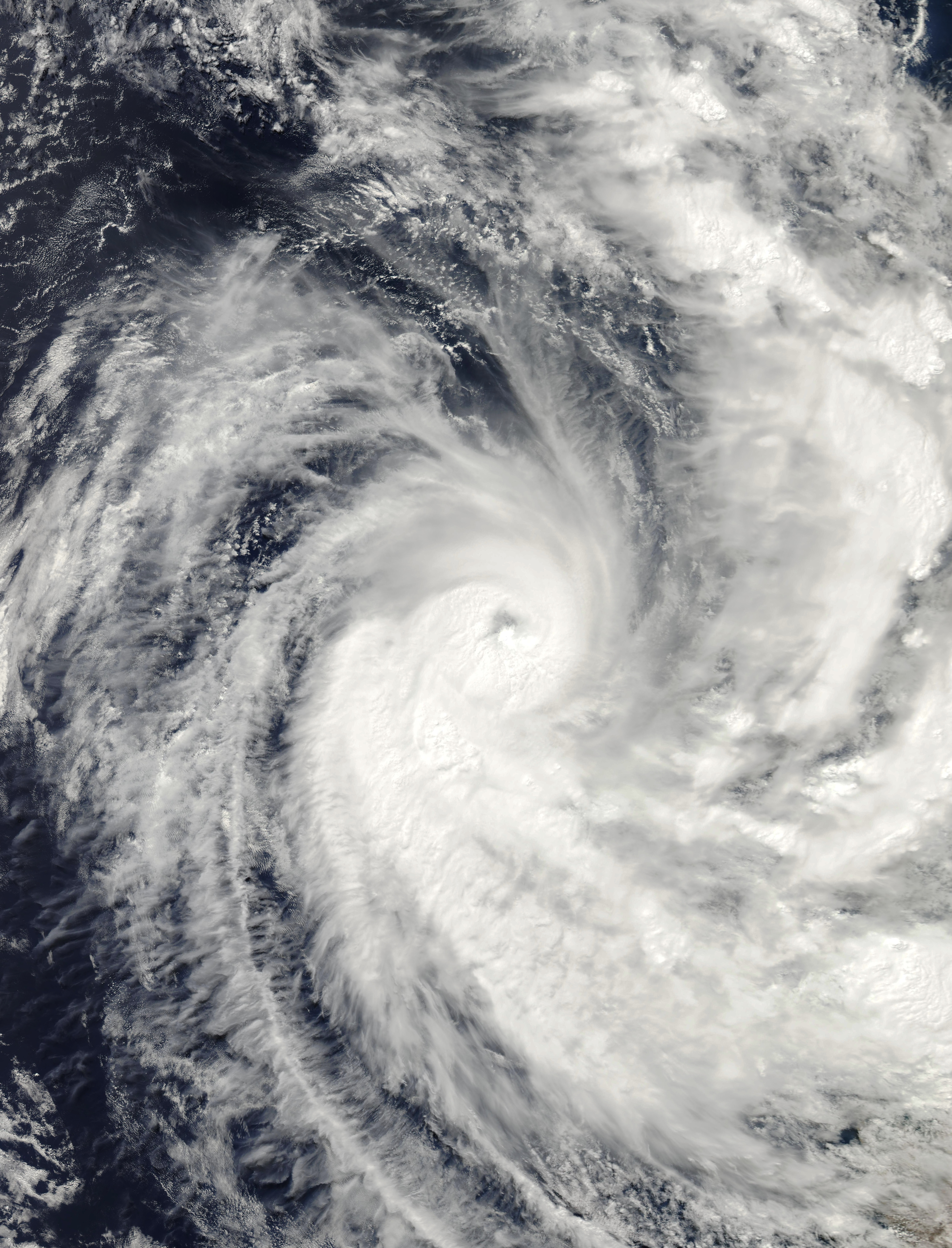
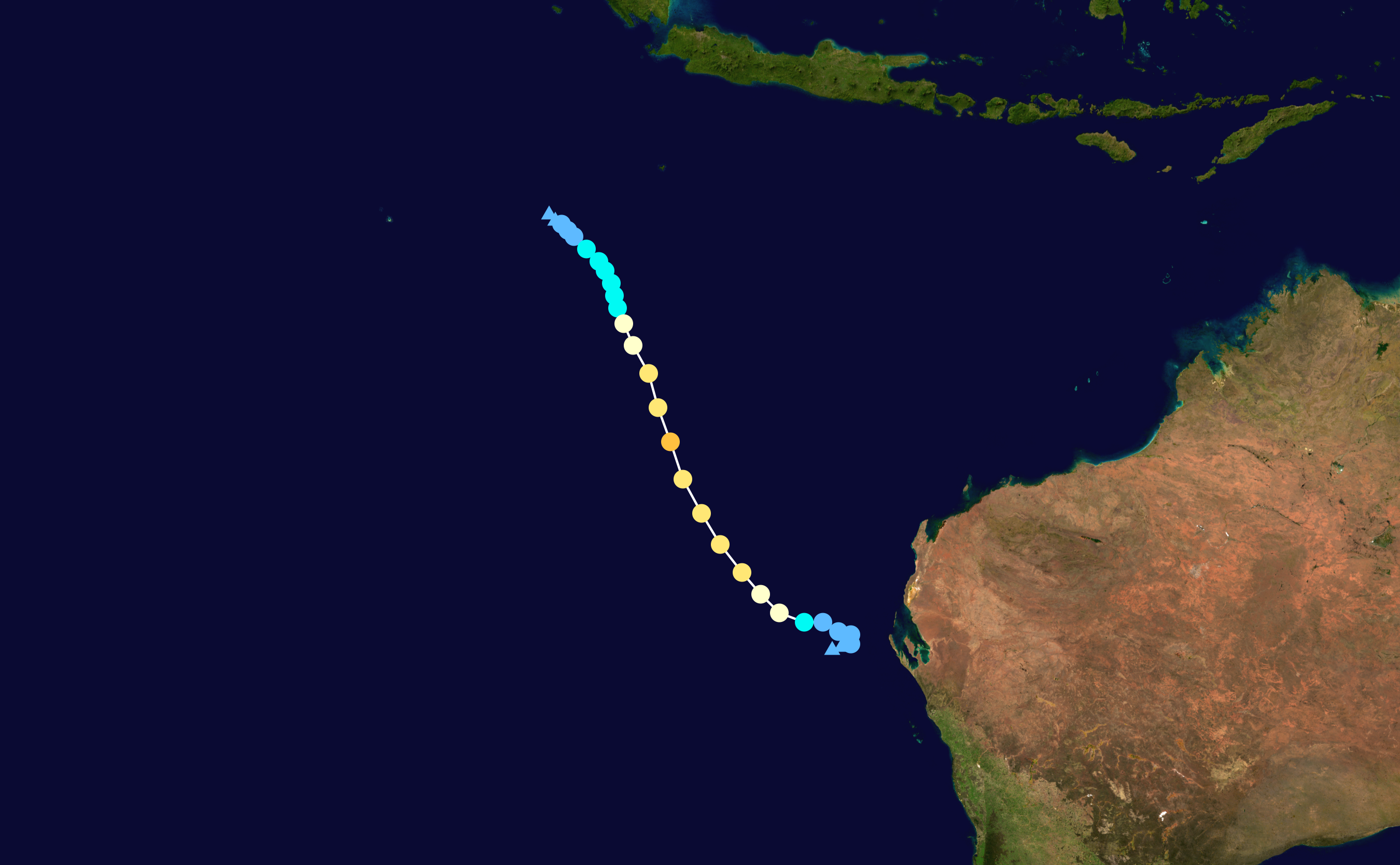
- Duration: 25 March – 29 March
- Peak intensity: 165 km/h (105 mph) (10-min); 938 hPa (mbar)

On 23 March a Tropical low formed south-west of Christmas Island. The next day TCWC Perth, began issuing shipping warnings on the Tropical low. Later that day the JTWC issued a Tropical Cyclone Formation Alert, on the tropical low. They then started issuing warnings that day designating it as Tropical Cyclone 26S. The low then intensified into a Tropical Cyclone and was named Pancho by TCWC Perth early on 25 March.
The next day, Pancho became a severe tropical cyclone on the Australian scale, with Pancho rapidly intensified into a minimal Category four cyclone on the Australian scale on 27 March. However, during the 28th, Tropical Cyclone Pancho entered an area of increasing vertical wind shear and cooler sea surface temperatures and within a few hours it was downgraded back to a Category 2 cyclone on the Australian scale. The cyclone then weakened back to a tropical low about 300 kilometres south-west of the Western Australian Gascoyne coast with gale-force winds remaining south of the low. with both TCWC Perth and the JTWC issuing their final warnings on Pancho that day.

The remnants of Pancho produced much needed rains over the drought-stricken areas of SW Western Australia. Mandurah, Garden Island, and Rottnest recorded the highest rainfall totals during the event at 56.4 mm (2.22 in), 49.8 and 49.4 mm (1.96 and 1.94 in) respectively. The heavy rains caused some flooding along several roads, forcing officials to temporarily shut them down. Large swells from the storm also washed rocks onto the roads near Exmouth.

=== Tropical Cyclone Rosie ===
- Category 2 tropical cyclone (Australian scale)
- Tropical storm (SSHWS)
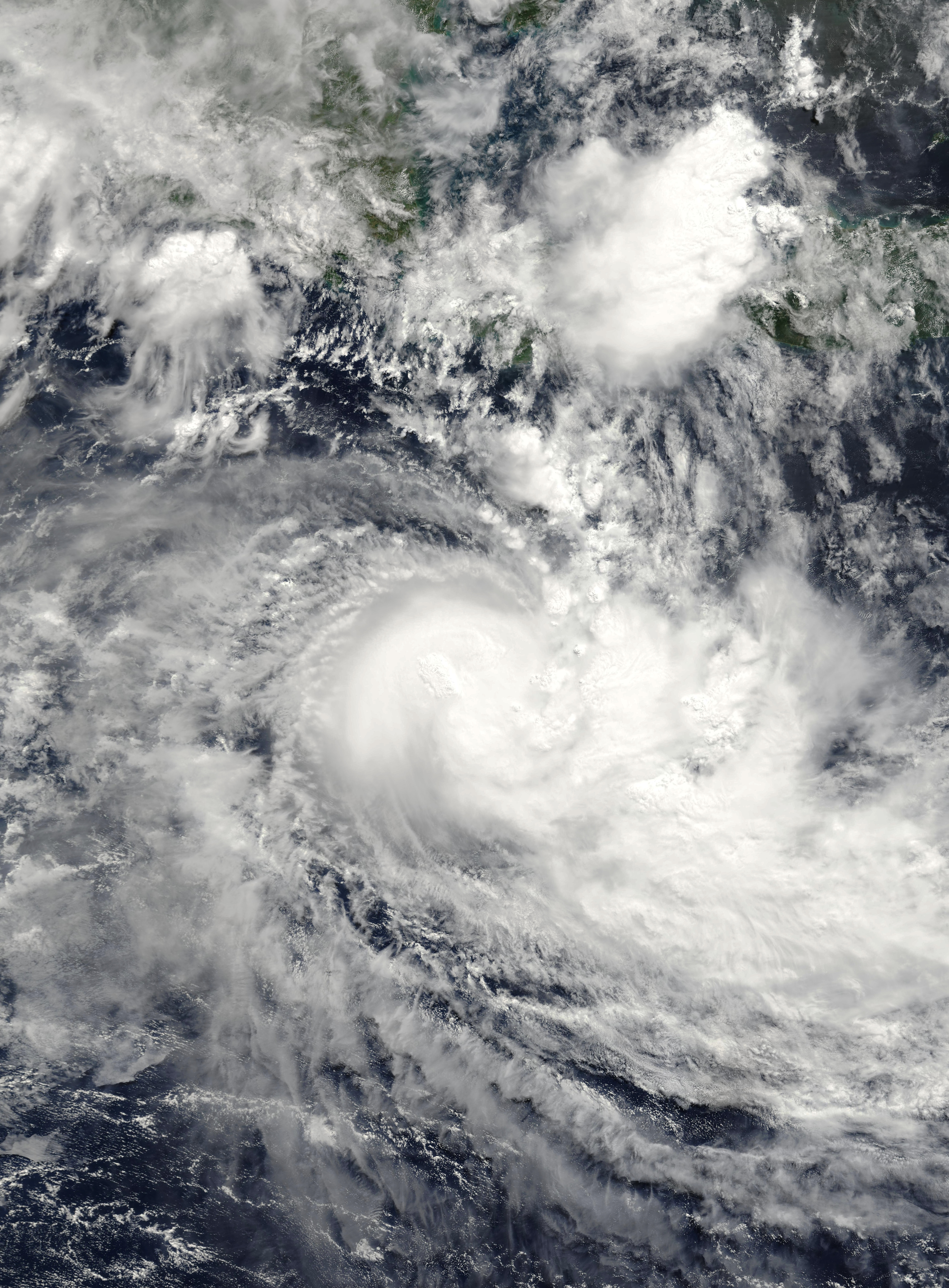
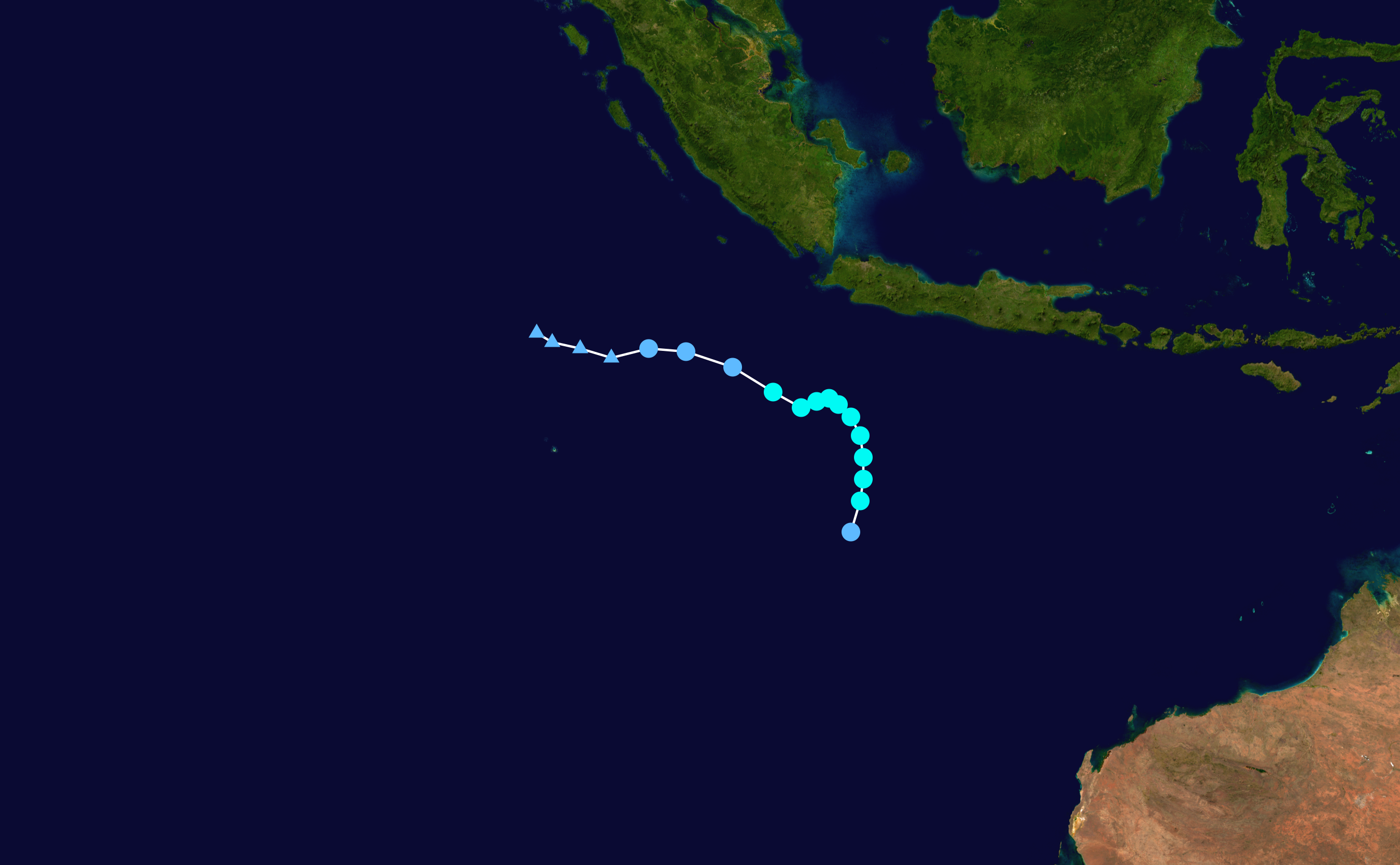
- Duration: 20 April – 24 April
- Peak intensity: 95 km/h (60 mph) (10-min); 988 hPa (mbar)

Late on 20 April, the JTWC, TCWC Jakarta and TCWC Perth all started to monitor a tropical low that had developed within the monsoon trough, about 1,030 km (640 mi), to the south-west of Jakarta, Indonesia. During 21 April, convection surrounding the system rapidly developed in generally favourable conditions and organized around a low level circulation centre. TCWC Jakarta and TCWC Perth then reported at 1500 UTC (2300 WST), that the low had developed into a category 1 tropical cyclone, before six hours later the JTWC followed suit and assigned it the designation 28S. However the cyclone was not named as Rosie, until early the next day after it had moved out of TCWC Jakarta's area of responsibility and moved into Perth's. As Rosie moved into TCWC Perth's area of responsibility, both TCWC Perth and the JTWC reported that the system had peaked with windspeeds of 95 km/h (59 mph), which meant that it was a category two tropical cyclone on the Australian scale and equivalent to a tropical storm on the SSHS.

After it had been named, Rosie weakened into a category one tropical cyclone with the low level circulation centre became devoid of convection as it moved towards the south-southeast towards Christmas Island. However convection redeveloped over the system later that day, but failed to become sustained or organized, as a result TCWC Perth reported early on 23 April, that Rosie had weakened into a tropical low despite it having 10-min windspeeds of 65 km/h (40 mph). During that day convection and gale-force winds eventually became confined to the south-east quadrant of the cyclone before the JTWC and TCWC Perth issued their final advisories on Rosie during 24 April as all convection surrounding the system had weakened and dissipated. During its lifetime, the only area that Tropical Cyclone Rosie affected was Christmas Island which recorded 52.8 mm (2.08 in) of rain between 21 and 23 April. Early on 22 April, heavy swells of between 5–7 metres (16–23 ft) affected Christmas Island, and caused some damage facilities on the shore and tore a mooring from its anchor.

=== Tropical Cyclone Durga ===
- Category 2 tropical cyclone (Australian scale)
- Tropical storm (SSHWS)
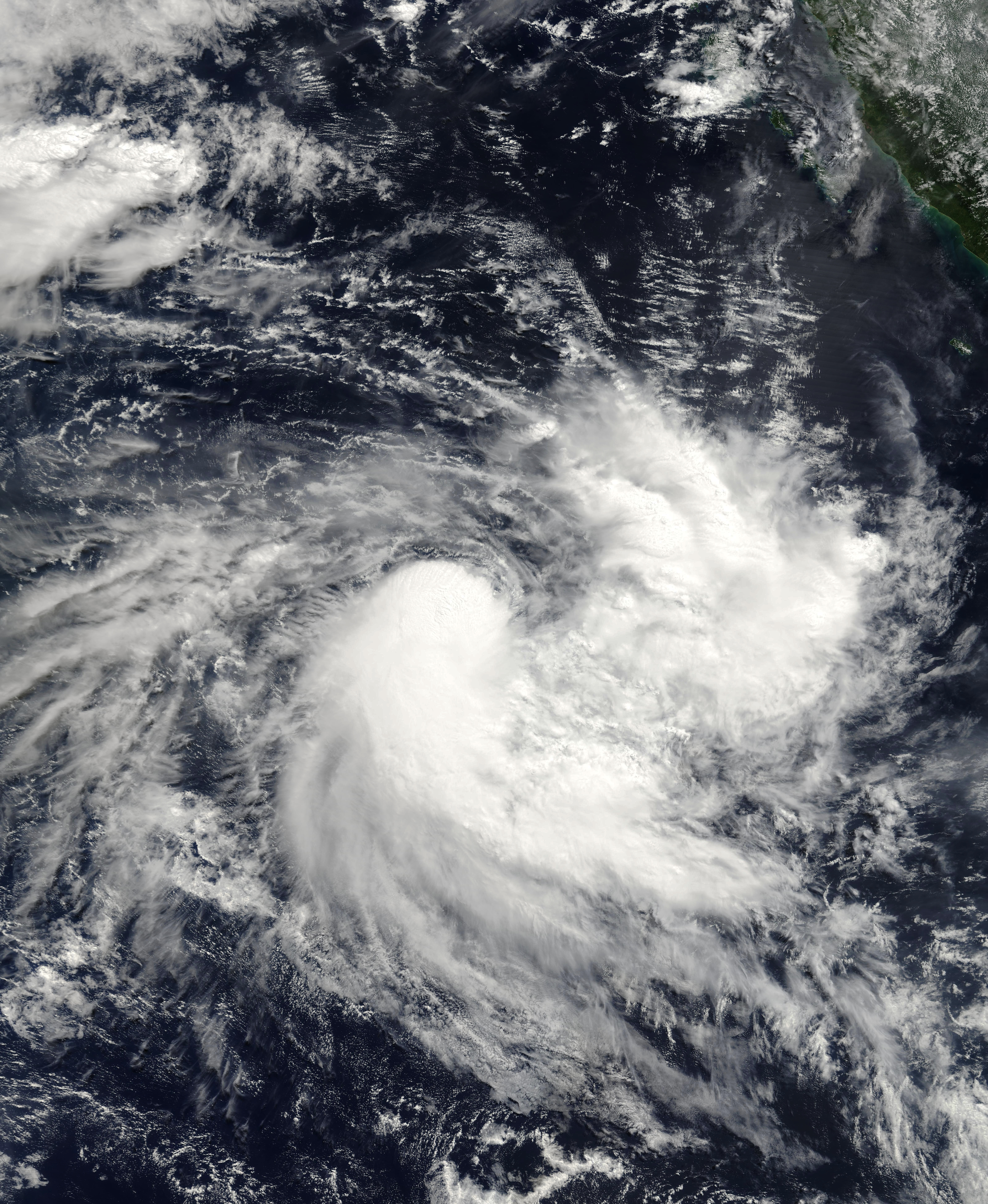
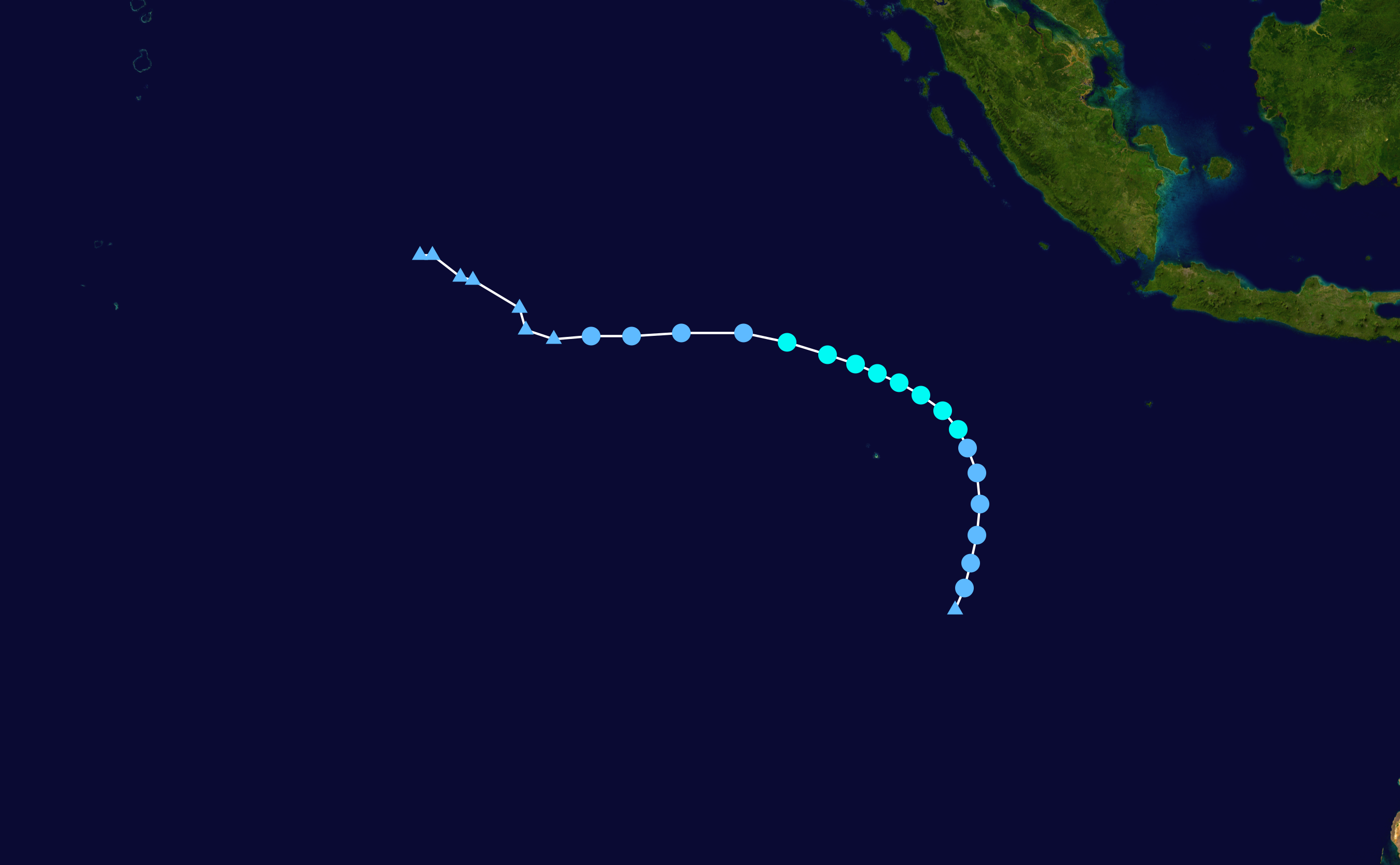
- Duration: 20 April – 26 April
- Peak intensity: 95 km/h (60 mph) (10-min); 984 hPa (mbar)

On 20 April, TCWC Perth and TCWC Jakarta both started to monitor a Tropical Low that was located within the South-West Indian Ocean about 2,847 km (1,769 mi) to the west of Jakarta, Indonesia. The low had developed within a monsoon trough of low pressure, however a moderate amount of northerly wind shear located over the system was hampering any further development of the system. Over the next few days as the low moved towards the southeast, the wind shear gradually decreased, which meant that convection was able to wrap around the system's low level circulation centre and help it develop into a category one tropical cyclone on 22 April. As the system developed into a category one tropical cyclone, it moved into TCWC Jakarta's area of responsibility who named it Durga.

== Storm names ==
At the start of the Tropical Cyclone Year in July, tropical lows that developed into tropical cyclones were named by one of the four tropical cyclone warning centres, which each had their own list of names. However, by January 2008, a fifth TCWC in Jakarta, Indonesia had become operational and subsequently in April 2008 named Tropical Low 23U, Durga. In November 2007, TCWC Port Moresby named Tropical Low 03U, Guba which was the first time that they had named a system since Tropical Cyclone Epi in 2002–03. During the season, TCWC Perth named 5 systems and identified a sixth that occurred in July 2007 that should have been named Lee operationally, while TCWC Darwin named 1 system and TCWC Brisbane named none. After the season, TCWC Perth, Darwin and Brisbane merged their naming lists into one list, while the names Guba and Helen were retired.

=== Lists ===
TCWC Perth

- Lee
- Melanie
- Nicholas
- Ophelia
- Pancho
- Rosie

TCWC Darwin

- Helen

TCWC Jakarta

- Durga

TCWC Port Moresby

- Guba

== Season effects ==
Name	Dates	Peak intensity			Areas affected	Damage (USD)	Deaths	Ref(s).
Name	Dates	Category	Wind speed	Pressure	Areas affected	Damage (USD)	Deaths	Ref(s).
01U	27–31 July	Category 1 tropical cyclone	75 km/h (45 mph)	992 hPa (29.29 inHg)	None	None	None	
Lee-Ariel	11 - 15 November 2007	Category 2 tropical cyclone	95 km/h (60 mph)	984 hPa (29.06 inHg)	None	None	None	
Guba	13–19 November	Category 3 tropical cyclone	140 km/h (87 mph)	970 hPa (28.64 inHg)	Papua New Guinea, Queensland	$71.4 million	149	
04U (Dama)	21–22 December	Tropical Low	55 km/h (34 mph)	998 hPa (29.47 inHg)	None	None	None	
Melanie	28 December–2 January	Category 2 tropical cyclone	110 km/h (70 mph)	962 hPa (28.41 inHg)	None	None	None	
Helen	31 December - 7 January	Category 2 tropical cyclone	95 km/h (60 mph)	975 hPa (28.79 inHg)	Northern Australia	$22.4 million	None	
07U	31 December- 2 January	Tropical Low	55 km/h (34 mph)	994 hPa (29.35 inHg)	None	None	None	
Low (17S)	2–10 February	Tropical Low	55 km/h (34 mph)	990 hPa (29.23 inHg)	None	None	None	
Nicholas	10–20 February	Category 3 tropical cyclone	130 km/h (81 mph)	956 hPa (28.23 inHg)	Western Australia	None	None	
Ophelia	29 February - 7 March 2008	Category 2 tropical cyclone	100 km/h (65 mph)	985 hPa (29.09 inHg)	Northern Territory, Western Australia	None	None	
20P	29 February	Tropical Low	55 km/h (34 mph)	999 hPa (29.5 inHg)	None	None	None	
Pancho	25–29 March	Category 4 tropical cyclone	165 km/h (103 mph)	938 hPa (27.70 inHg)	Christmas Island, Western Australia	None	None	
Rosie	20 - 24 April 2008	Category 2 tropical cyclone	95 km/h (60 mph)	988 hPa (29.18 inHg)	Christmas Island	Unknown	None	
Durga	20 - 26 April 2008	Category 2 tropical cyclone	95 km/h (60 mph)	988 hPa (29.18 inHg)	None	None	None	
Season aggregates
12	27 July – 24 April		175 km/h (109 mph)	934 hPa (27.58 inHg)				

== See also ==
- Tropical cyclones in 2007 and 2008
- Atlantic hurricane seasons: 2007, 2008
- Pacific hurricane seasons: 2007, 2008
- Pacific typhoon seasons: 2007, 2008
- North Indian Ocean cyclone seasons: 2007, 2008
