= Buffer P2 =

Lysis buffer solution

Buffer P2 is a lysis buffer solution produced by Qiagen. It contains 1% sodium dodecyl sulfate (SDS) (w/v) to puncture holes in cellular membranes, and 200mM NaOH. It is used in conjunction with other resuspension buffers and lysis buffers to release DNA from cells, often as part of the alkaline lysis method of purifying plasmid DNA from bacterial cell culture.
