= Parking (disambiguation) =

Parking is the act of stopping a vehicle and leaving it unoccupied for more than a brief time.

Parking may also refer to:

== Films ==
- Parking (1985 film), a French film
- Parking (2008 film), a Taiwanese film
- Parking (2019 film), an internationally co-produced film
- Parking (2023 film), an Indian film

== Computing and technology ==
- Call parking, moving an ongoing telephone conversation from one phone to another
- CPU core parking, of a microprocessor in PCs
- Domain parking, advertising content posted on an undeveloped domain on the World Wide Web, often used during construction of a page

== Other uses ==
- Parking, a term often used to refer to a:
  - Parking facility
  - Parking fee
- Parking, a euphemism for making out while in a parked car
- Parking, a term for a road verge in parts of the United States

== See also ==
- "No Parking on the Dance Floor"
- Parkin (disambiguation)
