= 20th Army =

Twentieth Army or 20th Army may refer to:

- 20th Group Army, People's Liberation Army
- 20th Mountain Army, Wehrmacht, German unit in WWII
- Twentieth Army (Japan), Imperial Japanese Army
- 20th Army (Soviet Union)
- 20th Guards Combined Arms Army, Soviet Union and Russia

== See also ==
- List of armies by number
- XX Corps (disambiguation)
- 20th Division (disambiguation)
- 20th Brigade (disambiguation)
- 20th Regiment (disambiguation)
- 20th Battalion (disambiguation)
- 20th Squadron (disambiguation)
- 20th (disambiguation)
