= Twentieth =

Twentieth is the ordinal form of the number 20.

Twentieth or 20th may also refer to:

- A fraction, 1/20, equal to one of 20 equal parts
- 20th of the month, a recurring calendar date
- 20th anniversary

== Geography ==
- 20th meridian east, a line of longitude
- 20th meridian west, a line of longitude
- 20th parallel north, a circle of latitude
- 20th parallel south, a circle of latitude
- 20th Avenue (disambiguation)
- 20th Street (disambiguation)

== Military ==
- Twentieth Army (disambiguation)
- 20th Battalion (disambiguation)
- 20th Brigade (disambiguation)
- 20th Corps (disambiguation)
- 20th Division (disambiguation)
- 20th Group (disambiguation)
- 20th Lancers (disambiguation)
- 20th Regiment (disambiguation)
- 20th Squadron (disambiguation)

== Other ==
- Twentieth Amendment (disambiguation)
  - Twentieth Amendment to the United States Constitution
- 20th century
- 20th century BC
- 20th Century Studios, formerly 20th Century Fox, an American film studio owned by The Walt Disney Company

== See also ==
- 20 (disambiguation)
- 20s
- 20th Anniversary, 2006 smooth jazz album by The Rippingtons
