= 20 =

Twenty or 20 may refer to:

- 20 (number), the natural number following 19 and preceding 21
- one of the years 20 BC, AD 20, 1920, 2020

== Science ==
- Calcium, an alkaline earth metal in the periodic table found in bones and teeth
- 20 Massalia, an asteroid in the asteroid belt

== Music ==
=== Albums ===
- 20 (2nd Chapter of Acts album), 1992
- 20 (Cunter album), 2011
- 20 (Dragana Mirković album), 2012
- 20 (Harry Connick, Jr. album), 1988
- 20 (Jan Smit album), 2016
- 20 (Kate Rusby album), 2012
- 20 (Terminaator album), 2007
- 20 (TLC album), 2013
- 20 (No Angels album), 2021
- 20, a 2021 album by from20
- #20 (Edmond Leung album), 2011
- 20th (album), by Casiopea, 2000
- 20 [Twenty], an album released in Japan by South Korean rock band F.T. Island, 2012
- Twenty (Boyz II Men album), 2011
- Twenty (Chicane album), 2016
- Twenty (Jebediah album), 2015
- Twenty (Lynyrd Skynyrd album), 1997
- Twenty (Robert Cray album), 2005
- Twenty (Taking Back Sunday album), 2019

=== Songs ===
- "Twenty" (The Rippingtons song) from 20th Anniversary, 2006
- "Twenty", a song by Karma to Burn from the album Wild, Wonderful Purgatory, 1999
- "#Twenty", a song by Itzy from the album "Crazy In Love ", 2021

=== Tours ===
- The Twenty Tour, a 2019 music concert tour by Irish pop vocal band Westlife
- Twenty (concert), a 2006 music concert by Filipina singer Regine Velasquez

== Places ==
- Twenty, Lincolnshire, a hamlet in England
  - Twenty railway station, a former railroad station in Lincolnshire, England
- The Twenty, Georgia or West Green, an American unincorporated community in Coffee County
- Twenty Lake, a lake in Minnesota
- Twenty Lakes Basin, in California's eastern Sierra

== Other uses ==
- 20 (TV channel), Italy
- Twenty (film), a 2015 South Korean film
- +20, the international dialing code for Egypt
- Tatra 20, a luxury car
- Renault 20, an executive hatchback
- Rover 20, various mid-sized cars
- Hillman 20, a series of 20 horsepower executive cars

== See also ==
- List of highways numbered 20
- 20P (disambiguation)
- 20s
- Twenty dollar bill (disambiguation)
- Twenties (disambiguation)
- Twentieth (disambiguation)
- XX (disambiguation)
- XX Corps (disambiguation)
- Class 20 (disambiguation)
- Model 20 (disambiguation)
- Type 20 (disambiguation)
