= 20th Group =

20th Group may refer to:

- 20th Operations Group, a unit of the United States Air Force
- 20th Special Forces Group, a unit of the United States Army
- 20th Group Army, a military formation of the People's Liberation Army Ground Force

== See also ==
- 20th Division (disambiguation)
- 20th Brigade (disambiguation)
- 20th Regiment (disambiguation)
- 20th Battalion (disambiguation)
- 20th Squadron (disambiguation)
