= 20th Field Artillery Regiment =

20th Field Artillery Regiment can refer to:

- 20th Field Artillery Regiment (Canada)
- 20th Field Artillery Regiment (Italy)
- 20th Field Artillery Regiment (United States)

== See also ==
- 20th Regiment (disambiguation)
