= 20th Infantry =

20th Infantry may refer to:

- 20th Infantry Division (disambiguation)
- 20th Infantry Brigade (disambiguation)
- 20th Infantry Regiment (disambiguation)

== See also ==
- 20th (disambiguation)
