= Twenties =

Twenties may refer to:

- 20s
- 1920s
- 2020s
- Twenties (TV series), an American comedy series broadcast from 2020
- "Twenties" (song), a 2025 song by Giveon

== See also ==
- '20s (disambiguation)
- 20P (disambiguation)
- Twenty dollar bill (disambiguation)
- Twentieth (disambiguation)
