= 20th Regiment of Light Dragoons =

Four cavalry regiments of the British Army have been called the 20th Regiment of Light Dragoons:

- 20th Light Dragoons (1760), Enniskilling Light Horse, an Irish corps of hussars raised in 1760, and disbanded in 1763
- 20th Light Dragoons (1779), raised in 1779 from the light troops of the 3rd Dragoon Guards, 1st Dragoons and 11th Dragoons, and disbanded in 1783
- 20th Light Dragoons, Jamaica Dragoons, raised in 1795, and seeing service in the Second Maroon War, the British invasions of the River Plate and the Peninsular War before being disbanded 1818
- The former 2nd Bengal European Cavalry of the East India Company service, transferred to the British Army in 1862, and redesignated as the 20th Hussars in 1877. In 1890, they were recognized as the successor unit of the and awarded their battle honours; after several amalgamations, they are now represented by the King's Royal Hussars

== See also ==
- 20th Regiment (disambiguation)
- 20th Hussars (1877–1922), a cavalry regiment of the British Army
