= NS20 =

NS20, NS 20, NS-20, NS.20, or variation, may refer to:

== Places ==
- Novena MRT station (station code: NS20), Novena, Singapore; a mass transit station
- Guysborough-Eastern Shore-Tracadie (constituency N.S. 20), Nova Scotia, Canada; a provincial electoral district

== Technology ==
- NS-20 inertial navigation system, for the D37D flight computer of the LGM-118 Peacekeeper
- Travan NS20, data backup tape standard

== Other uses ==
- Lakshya (2021 film), codenamed "NS20"
- New Penguin Shakespeare volume 20
- Blue Origin NS-20, a Blue Origin suborbital spaceflight by the New Shepard space capsule on 31 March 2022

== See also ==
- NS (disambiguation)
- 20 (disambiguation)
