= Battle of Oshakan =

Battle during the Russo–Persian War

- Part of the Russo-Persian War (1826–1828)
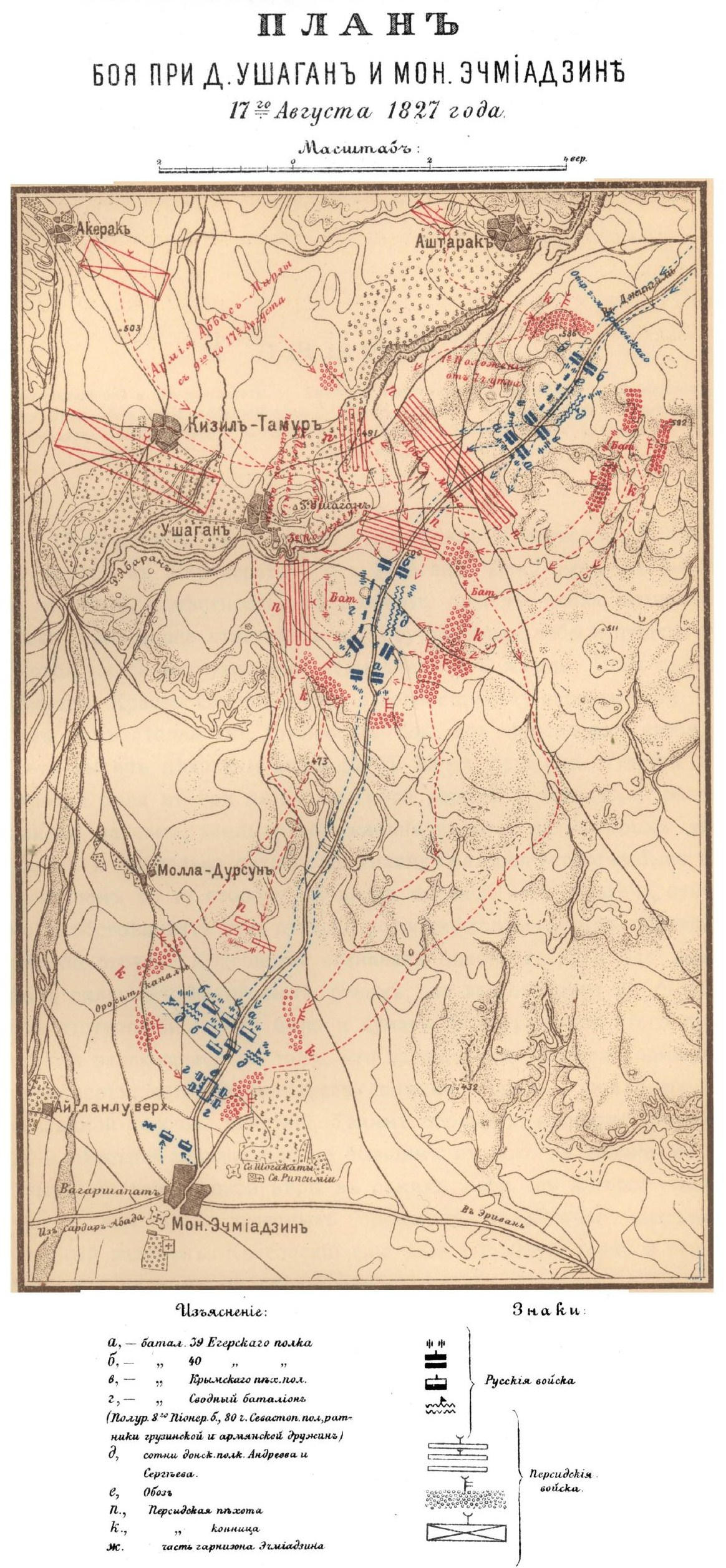
Date	29 August [O.S. 17 August] 1827
Location	Erivan Khanate (Eastern Armenia) now Aragatsotn Province, Armenia
Result	Persian victory
Territorial changes	Persian army lifting of the siege of the Echmiadzin Monastery and refuses to invade Georgian Governorate

Belligerents
Russian Empire; Armenian volunteers	Qajar Iran; Erivan Khanate

Commanders and leaders
(Russian Empire) A. I. Krasovsky [ru]	Abbas Mirza; Hossein Sardar

Strength
2,300–3,000 men 12 guns Persian sources: 6,000–8,000	30,000 men 22–24 guns

Casualties and losses
24 officers 1,130 lower ranks all provisions Persian data: 3,200 men and 6 guns there are other data	3,000–3,500 men according to Persian data: 1,000 men

The Battle of Oshakan (Armenian: Օշականի ճակատամարտ) was a battle that took place on 29 August 1827 during the Russo-Persian War (1826–1828) between the army of the heir to the Persian throne Abbas Mirza and the Russian detachment of Lieutenant General Afanasy Krasovsky.

At the beginning of August 1827, the Persian army invaded Eastern Armenia, and, joining with the troops of sardar Husayn Khan Qajar of the Erivan Khanate, besieged the Etchmiadzin Monastery. The Russian military detachment of General Krasovsky, which was located 35 versts from Etchmiadzin, along with Armenian and Georgian volunteers who joined him, set out to aid the besieged monastery and, despite the tenfold numerical superiority of the Persian army, managed to break through the enemy's blocking lines, after which the siege was lifted that same night. During the battle, the Russian detachment suffered heavy losses. This was the greatest damage to the Russian army in all wars with Persia.

The most valuable information about the battle was left by its direct participants: the detachment commander A. Krasovsky, Captain M. Sobolev and the Decembrist Yevdokim Lachinov.

The course of the battle was greatly influenced by the heat that prevailed that day and the lack of water sources along the route of the Russian detachment. The detachment's actions were significantly constrained by the supply train with provisions. The columns moved under dense artillery and rifle fire from the enemy. While the Russian vanguard "cleared the way with bayonets," the rearguard repelled attacks by the Persians from the rear. The enemy, occupying an advantageous position, inflicted flanking strikes on the Russian detachment. The successful passage of Krasovsky's detachment was also facilitated by the competent actions of the Russian artillery, which occupied the most advantageous heights, and the guns, under the cover of riflemen, restrained the enemy's attacks as much as possible. The ferocity of the Iranians reached the point that, despite heavy losses from canister shot and rifle fire, they broke into the ranks of the Russian infantry, which repelled the enemy back with bayonets.

Significant assistance and support to the Russian army was provided by the local Armenian population and Armenian volunteers.

In 1833–1834, at the initiative of the Catholicos of All Armenians Ep'rem I Zoragetts'i and Archbishop Nerses Ashtaraketsi, with funds from the monastery and local residents, a commemorative obelisk was erected in honor of the battle.

On 19 April 2011, the solemn opening of the Oshakan Memorial Complex To the Russian Warrior-Saviors of the Mother See of Holy Etchmiadzin, Fallen in the Battle of Oshakan in 1827 took place.

This battle with Battle of Sultanabad the greatest victories of Qajar iran in war with empire of russia

== Background ==
=== Lifting of the Erivan siege ===
On 15 June 1827, the 20th Infantry Division under the command of General Krasovsky arrived for the siege of Erivan. The summer of 1827 was extremely hot and dry. Temperatures reached 43 °R (53.7 °C) in the sun and 33 °R (41.2 °C) in the shade. The local climate contributed to the spread of mass diseases among soldiers who had recently arrived from Russia. Fevers and the outbreak of a dysentery epidemic left less than 4,000 combatants in the 20th Division fit for duty. Thus, in August, the commander of the Caucasus Corps, adjutant general I. F. Paskevich, describing the general situation in the Russian army in the Caucasus, reported to Nicholas I that the heat continued, there was no forage, the horses were exhausted, and 1/3 of the troops were in hospitals. In regiments with 1,800 men according to the establishment, about 1,000 remained in the ranks (with the exception of the guard, in which the number of sick was no more than 200, and 900 remained under arms). It was decided to lift the siege of Erivan and retreat to the mountains before the onset of autumn. Another reason was that the transport with provisions and siege guns was not expected until August.

On the night of 21 June the division withdrew from the siege positions and retreated to the Etchmiadzin Monastery. A hospital for sick soldiers was set up in the monastery. One field gun was installed on each of the three monastery towers. On 24 June up to 2,000 soldiers began procuring provisions.

Having supplied the monastery with a sufficient amount of provisions, Krasovsky on 30 June with his corps headed to the Bash-Abaran heights and encamped at the Dzhenguli tract. In the monastery remained a battalion of the Sevastopol Infantry Regiment (up to 500 bayonets), 5 guns, a mounted hundred from the Armenian volunteer detachment, which had asked Krasovsky for permission to stay to defend the monastery, and 700 sick soldiers.

=== Siege of the Etchmiadzin Monastery ===
The Erivan sardar Husayn Khan, learning that only battalion of the Sevastopol Regiment was in the Etchmiadzin Monastery, attempted to capture the monastery, and on 3 July, 4,000 cavalry (according to other sources, 500) and two battalions of sarbazes (2,000 men) with two (according to other sources, three) guns left Erivan and besieged the monastery the next day. On the slopes of Mount Aragats, opposite the Russian camp, a detachment of Karapapakh cavalry of 1,000 men under the leadership of Nagi Khan was positioned to monitor the actions of Krasovsky's corps.

The commandant of the Etchmiadzin garrison at that time was an elderly staff officer of the 20th Artillery Brigade — Lieutenant Colonel Lindenfeld. The sardar sent him a letter assuring the commandant that Paskevich with the main forces had retreated from Nakhichevan to Georgia and no help could be expected for the Etchmiadzin garrison, offering the latter to leave the monastery. For his part, Husayn Khan guaranteed safe passage for the garrison in any direction, vouching for its safety. Otherwise, the monastery would be taken by force, and then no one would be spared.

The response to the letter was a cannon shot from the monastery tower. Husayn Khan was forced to move the troops to a safe distance and, surrounding the monastery, blocked all communication routes. However, on 5 July, several local Armenians still managed to reach the Russian camp at Dzhenguli and inform Krasovsky of the besieged state of the monastery. Krasovsky immediately dispatched two battalions with four guns toward Etchmiadzin. The Karapapakh detachment informed Husayn Khan of the Russian movement, and the sardar, lifting the blockade, retreated to Sardarabad and then withdrew to Erivan.

=== The Persian Army's invasion ===
==== Reconnaissance ====
The Persian command used spies and scouts, mainly among the local population — Armenians, Tatars, and Persians. Usually these were sutlers, trading in the Russian camp. Krasovsky, to obtain information about the enemy, more often had to conduct reconnaissances and cavalry scouts.

The reason for the weaker intelligence network of the Russian command was the executions and cruel tortures by the Iranians of Russian spies or scouts, while detected Iranian spies were flogged and, after being held under guard for some time, released, after which the latter could continue their craft.

In Etchmiadzin, Nerses Ashtaraketsi established a system for collecting information about the enemy. Scouts were sent from him to Erivan and Sardarabad. Reports to the commander-in-chief were duplicated. An Armenian, Kaziyar Arutyunov, was engaged in reconnaissance of enemy movements. Krasovsky was passed valuable information by the nephew of Archbishop Ashtaraketsi — Pedros Markarov. The latter reported on 6 August about the invasion of Persian troops. The same news was confirmed the next day by the arriving from the Persian camp Armenian elder melik Saak Agamalyan, who commanded the Armenian infantry of the Erivan sardar Husayn Khan.

Information about the enemy in the Russian headquarters sometimes had a contradictory character. When Krasovsky sent a report to Paskevich in the main camp at Kara-Baba about the concentration of large Persian forces near his camp, Paskevich replied that, according to the information he had, a mutiny had occurred in the Persian army, and Abbas Mirza himself had been arrested and was under guard in Chors. Krasovsky later wrote:

Such contradictory to the truth information served as clear proof that at corps headquarters they did not know at all that Abbas Mirza with his main forces was opposite me in the Erivan province, which is why I had to be convinced that there was no way I could expect reinforcements.

— — from "Diary of General Krasovsky 1826–1828" dated 13 August

==== Invasion ====
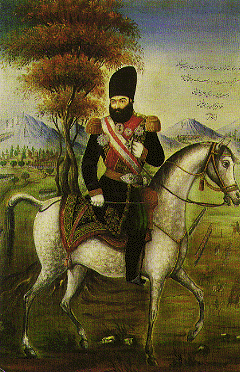
Abbas Mirza

Having gathered all the necessary information about the Russians, Husayn Khan sent a letter to Abbas Mirza, in which he wrote that Erivan had been freed from the blockade; the Russians, leaving many sick and a small garrison in the Etchmiadzin Monastery, had retreated to the mountains; Krasovsky's detachment was small and consisted of young and inexperienced soldiers there was nothing easier than to capture Etchmiadzin now, recapture the siege artillery still moving in the Bazum Mountains and, destroying Krasovsky, open the road to Georgia.

On 4 August, the army of Abbas Mirza (15,000 cavalry and 10,000 infantry with 22 guns), crossing the Araks near Sardarabad, invaded the Erivan Khanate, and on 8 August, occupied the village of Ashtarak, located between Etchmiadzin and the Russian camp at Dzhenguli. Convinced of the impregnability of the Russian positions on the Bash-Abaran heights, Abbas Mirza withdrew his troops to Oshakan and encamped.

==== Purpose of the invasion ====
It was planned to capture the Etchmiadzin Monastery, then by a flanking march through Gyumri to invade Georgia and raze Tiflis to the ground, after which—through Elisavetpol and the Karabakh province via the Hudafarin Bridge or through the Aslanduz ford to cross the Araks and return to Azerbaijan.

With the appearance of the Persian army in the rear of the main Russian forces, Paskevich would have been forced to abandon the campaign against Tabriz. Krasovsky assessed Abbas Mirza's actions as follows:

...he [Abbas Mirza] could easily have carried out [his plans], without encountering anywhere more than one battalion for defense, within 10-15 days, and then all our troops located in the main forces at Kara-Baba, at Dzhenguli, and generally in the Erivan and Nakhichevan provinces, would necessarily have had to, suffering disaster without provisions, return to Georgia and seek it there for their salvation.

— — from "Diary of General Krasovsky 1826–1828"

However, Abbas Mirza's plans became known to the Tiflis military governor adjutant general N. M. Sipyagin, who immediately transferred two companies of the 41st Jaeger Regiment from Tsalka to Bashkychet, and to Gyumri were transferred a company of the Tiflis Infantry Regiment with two guns and a battalion of the Sevastopol Infantry Regiment from Gen. Krasovsky's corps.

==== First encounters ====
Military Camp in the Caucasus, art. G. F. Shukaev (1862)

In the morning of 10 August, 2000 Persian cavalry appeared in front of the Russian camp on the side of the Abanani River. The Cossack outpost pickets, maneuvering, grouped up to fifty men and fired until reinforcements arrived. Two Cossack hundreds and two infantry battalions with two guns were sent to help. With the arrival of reinforcements, the Cossacks, supported by infantry, counterattacked and drove back the Persian cavalry. In the battle, the chorunzhiy (second lieutenant) Kryukov was wounded in the leg by a saber.

On the night of 13 August, Persian cavalry approached the Russian camp from several sides through hidden gorges and at dawn suddenly attacked the Cossack outposts. However, the Cossacks managed to hold out until the infantry arrived, after which the Iranians were repulsed from all directions. At that time, Krasovsky with General P. Kh. Truzson and 50 Cossacks was conducting a reconnaissance along the Etchmiadzin road. Fearing for the detachment commander, an infantry battalion with one gun moved from the camp toward him. In the gorge of Mount Karni-Yarykh, Truzson with five Cossacks, who were ahead of the reconnaissance detachment, noticed an ambush from afar and stopped. A Cossack patrol went to that place daily to obtain information by telegraph about the situation in the Etchmiadzin Monastery. About 500 Persian horsemen, realizing they had been detected, rushed in pursuit of the detachment, but after a few versts saw the approaching battalion of Russian infantry and turned back.

The same day, from Krasovsky's camp, the movement of large Iranian forces toward Sudagent was noticed, from where at that very time the Tiflis military governor Sipyagin was to arrive from the main camp at Kara-Baba on Paskevich's orders. Krasovsky immediately set out in that direction with two infantry battalions and four guns to help Sipyagin. On the Sudagent road, the latter was indeed attacked by Persian cavalry, but the battalion of the Sevastopol Regiment sent the day before to meet the governor managed to repel all enemy attacks.

Up to 4,000 Persian cavalry appeared between Mount Aragats and the Russian camp. Krasovsky moved against them with two infantry battalions, up to 50 men of Borchal cavalry, two guns with Cossacks, and a detachment of Congreve rockets. In his dispatch, Krasovsky noted the successful action of the latter. Up to 20 Congreve rockets were fired, "which dispersed the enemy crowds". The battalion of the 40th Jaeger Regiment, reinforced by Sevastopol men, "pressed him until night".

== Siege of the Etchmiadzin Monastery ==
On 15 August, a part of the Persian army—under the command of Yusuf Khan (Yusup Khan), Zograb Khan and Topchiba — besieged the Etchmiadzin.

On the proposal of Yusuf Khan to surrender the monastery, the commandant replied: "I will not surrender". Then Yusuf Khan tried to persuade Lindenfeld to enter the shah's service, promising all possible privileges. The Persian dignitaries were not stingy with promises. Lindenfeld replied:

"Russians do not trade themselves, and if the monastery is needed by the Persians, then let them enter it as honest warriors, with weapons in hand".

Yusuf Khan sent a letter to Archbishop Nerses with the following content:

"If you do not voluntarily open the gates, then I will surround the monastery with all the artillery, cannons, mortars—and raze it to the ground. Then, Nerses, the sin will lie on your soul".

Nerses gave the following response:

"The abode is strong with the protection of God, try to take it...".

In the morning of 16 August, the Persian artillery began an intense shelling of the monastery. The cannonade was heard in the Russian camp at Dzhenguli, which greatly worried Krasovsky. Communication with the Russian camp was cut off. Several Armenians and Tatars who tried to break through from the camp to Etchmiadzin and from Etchmiadzin to the camp were captured by the Persians. Two of them had their eyes gouged out, two had their noses and ears cut off, and several people from them disappeared without a trace. However, Krasovsky received some information from four defectors from the Persian camp. The fugitive sarbazes reported that the Erivan sardar had given his word to Abbas Mirza to present him with the keys to Etchmiadzin in two days, and Abbas, for his part, promised the sardar to give all the Russian siege artillery for the Erivan fortress. This news was soon confirmed by melik Saak Agamalyan, who described in detail the plan of action of the Persian army.

The adjutant provided Krasovsky with a provision ledger, according to which food in the monastery was running out. The latter immediately ordered the formation of a transport with ten days' provisions on ox carts.

== Krasovsky participation ==
Order of General Krasovsky No. 40, 16 August 1827

Guys! I am confident in your bravery, I know your readiness to beat the enemy. Whatever circunstances we meet, we won't consider him. We are strong before him by the unity of our feeling: love for the fatherland, loyalty to the oath, fulfillment of the sacred will of our sovereign. Remember that strict order and arrangement will always lead you to victory. If the enemy flees — pursue him quickly, decisively, but do not disorder your ranks, do not get carried away by impetuosity. The Persians have a lot of cavalry; therefore, riflemen should not retreat to large distances and, in dangerous cases, quickly gather into groups. I ask you, gentlemen officers, to have the strictest supervision over this. I hope, guys, that my wishes will be fulfilled exactly, that order, silence and unconditional obedience will be a holy and main duty for each of you.

In the event of an offensive by Persian troops, Lieutenant General Krasovsky was given instructions by the commander-in-chief of the Separate Caucasus Corps, I. F. Paskevich, to attack the enemy with all forces (about 6,000 men). However, to aid the besieged monastery, Krasovsky decided to march with forces of about 2,000 men from the composition of his detachment.

On 28 August 1827, at five o'clock in the afternoon, the detachment was lined up in front of their tents. Krasovsky, riding along the ranks, announced the order:

The soldiers, removing their headgear, knelt and performed a farewell moleben. The officers, having venerated the cross, took their places. The protopriest of the Sevastopol Infantry Regiment, Father Timofey Mokritsky, sprinkling the banners and the detachment with holy water, loudly addressed the soldiers:

Brethren! Don't be afraid of the multitude of your enemies. It will only glorify your courage, bring you even greater laurels and honors. The Almighty God, strong even in the small number of his chosen ones, will destroy the multitudinous hordes of enemies who do not know His holy name. Therefore, arm, Orthodox warriors, your strong muscles with the victorious Russian sword, your spirit —with bravery, your heart— with faith and hope in God, your helper, and He will preserve and glorify you!

— — from "Diary of General Krasovsky 1826–1828"

In the camp at Dzhenguli there remained a battalion of the Crimean Infantry Regiment, half-companies of engineers and 10 guns under the command of Major General E. A. Berkhman.

== Order of battle ==
=== Russian detachment ===
The combined marching detachment consisted of:

==== Infantry ====
- A battalion of the Crimean Infantry Regiment;
- A battalion of the 39th Jaeger Regiment;
- A combined battalion consisting of:
  - two companies of the 40th Jaeger Regiment;
  - a company of pioneers;
  - 80 men of the Sevastopol battalion;
  - 60 men of the foot Georgian-Armenian militia;
- 40th Jaeger Regiment (had 3 companies in each battalion).

==== Cavalry ====
- Don Cossack Andreev Regiment;
- Don Cossack Sergeev Regiment (The total number of the two Cossack regiments was up to 500 men, according to other data did not exceed 300);
- 1st Mounted company of the Armenian volunteer squad (supplemented the Cossack regiments).

==== Artillery ====
- 4 battery guns;
- 6 light guns of the 20th Artillery Brigade;
- 2 horse-Cossack guns.

In 1969, the military historian Khaji-Murat Ibrahimbeili proposed another non-traditional version above sources. According to his report, in Krasovsky's detachment, besides the already mentioned forces, there were also 5,000 Tatar (Azerbaijani) irregular cavalry. Justifying this statement, Ibrahimbeili wrote that "a detachment of 2,800 men under all conditions would not have been able to defeat the 30-thousand-strong enemy corps reinforced with 22 guns”, and “the noble-bourgeois historiography of Tsarist Russia did not mention the participation in the composition of the Russian troops of Azerbaijani cavalry, Georgian and Armenian foot squads". However, contrary to this opinion, documents indicate the presence in Krasovsky's marching detachment to Echmiadzin of the last two, and the Borchalin (Azerbaijani) cavalry is mentioned in the Alagez battle August 25 [O.S. August 13] 1827 of the same year. Moreover, the subsequent accusations by Paskevich against Krasovsky regarding the latter's march no more than with 4 battalions to the Echmiadzin Monastery would have no basis.

Persian sources report that Abbas Mirza received information that the Russian forces in the camp at Dzhenguli, protected by the terrain, numbered 5,000 infantry and 1,000 cavalry, and the same number is attributed to those who took part in the battle. The same strength is given by Percy Sykes.

=== Persian army ===
According to English, Russian and Armenian (or Soviet) sources, the total strength of the troops of Abbas Mirza and Sardar Husayn Khan was 30,000 men with 24 guns.

- The Persian army's strength that invaded Eastern Armenia consisted in 25,000 men (15,000 cavalry and 10,000 infantry with 22 guns). It included: the army of Abbas Mirza himself — 20,000 (13,000 cavalry and 7,000 infantry), which also included the Russian battalion of Samson Khan (S. Ya. Makintsev), formed from Russian prisoners of war and deserters. (Note: What role the Russian battalion played in the battle is unknown. Even at the beginning of the war, Samson Khan declared to Abbas Mirza: "We swore on the Holy Gospel not to shoot against our co-religionists and we will not break our oath”. Then Abbas Mirza appointed him his advisor, and promised to keep the Russian battalion in reserve.) Also, groups that joined the main forces: of the son of Fath-Ali Shah — Ali Naqi Mirza of Qazvin — and of the son of the king of Kakheti Heraclius II — Tsarevich Alexander. It is known that the artillery was then commanded by Yusuf Khan (Ts. Mayinyan), and all the sarbaz — by the sartib (general) Magomet Khan.
- Sources say nothing about the strength of the troops of the Erivan sardar Husayn Khan who took part in the battle; however, if one takes into account the total number of forces opposing the Russian detachment (30,000), it is quite reasonable to assume that the sardar's forces consisted of 5,000 infantry and cavalry. Approximately the same number is mentioned in the siege by Husayn Khan of the Echmiadzin Monastery in July of the same year (4,000 cavalry and 2,000 infantry with 2 or 3 guns). It is also known that the Erivan infantry, mainly consisting of Armenian sarbaz, was led by Melik Saak Agamalian, who closely collaborated with the Russian command.

== Battle ==
From the diary of E. Lachinov:

"…The enemy's artillery acted strongly, but this battle in all respects can be counted among the fierce battles, especially considering the disproportion of the fighting forces and our position. In that one day, I managed to see all the horrors of combat: firearms of every kind, even those not used in Europe, were turned against us, but the destruction they caused could not compare with that when fresh hordes of horsemen threw themselves upon our exhausted warriors, when hand-to-hand combat ensued and their daggers flashed before our eyes and their sabers whistled over our heads".

By the 28 August 1827 evening, Krasovsky's detachment ascended one of the elevations and saw the Persian army in the distance, which came into motion at the sight of the Russian detachment. Mounted patrols hurried to the main camp to report the appearance of the Russians. Meanwhile, Krasovsky's detachment descended into the valley and by 9 o'clock in the evening stood in combat order for the night near the village of Sagni-Savanga.

Early in the morning 29 August 1827, the Russian detachment moved along a mountain road representing a rocky area with steep descents and no water. Despite the early morning, a scorching heat already prevailed. During the movement, wagons began to break down, and the soldiers often had to help pull the loaded carts themselves. By 7 o'clock in the morning, the Cossack hundreds and the first column with two horse-drawn guns ascended a rocky elevation between the villages of Ushagan (Oshakan) and Ashtarak and stopped for a halt awaiting the rearguard with the supply train. From the elevation, Krasovsky, surrounded by staff officers, examined the terrain through a telescope. From the side of Ashtarak, the Persian forces were fording the Abaran (Kasakh) river. Up to 10,000 infantry, lined up in three lines, blocked the road to Echmiadzin, adjoining with their left flank to the Abaran. Cavalry and artillery occupied all nearby heights. The main batteries were installed on the Oshakan elevation on the opposite bank, from where a long section of the road leading to Echmiadzin and the approaches to the river —the only water source— were under fire.

On a rocky hill adjoining the road, up to three hundred Persian horsemen appeared. Dismounting, they took cover behind stones and opened rifle fire on the lagging column with the train. A platoon of jaeger riflemen immediately attacked the enemy, and the latter abandoned their positions before the jaegers climbed the hill.

Meanwhile, up to 5,000 Persian cavalry in two columns emerged from a deep ravine and stood on the road in front of the Russian detachment, but after an artillery shot, they retreated to the heights on the left side of the road.

Krasovsky's detachment continued to stand in place awaiting the lagging columns. Abbas Mirza regarded the slowness of the Russian detachment as indecision to advance and, to lure it down from the mountain, staged a retreat by withdrawing the infantry to the river and hiding it in a deep ravine. Krasovsky saw through the purpose of this maneuver, saying to the officers: "What an Abbas Mirza!" From the elevation where the Russian detachment was located, the road to Echmiadzin passed through a gorge between two low elevations, in which Abbas Mirza planned to trap Krasovsky's detachment and destroy it with crossfire. Retreat would entail the loss of Echmiadzin. In this situation, Krasovsky had to make a difficult decision, and he ordered to advance.

Lacking the possibility to pass the gorge through the defile with a deployed front, Krasovsky advanced the detachment in the following order. In the vanguard on both sides of the road went two companies each of the 39th Jaeger Regiment battalion with four guns (on the right side—two battery guns, on the left—two light guns)—under the command of Colonel Y. G. Raenko. Next, in the same order on both sides of the road followed the Crimean Battalion, with two light guns on each side. In the center stretched the train, covered on the right by the combined battalion, on the left by Cossack hundreds—under the command of Major General L. A. Tukholka. In the rearguard went the 40th Jaeger Regiment with two battery and two light guns—under the command of Major General P. Kh. Truzson.

=== Battle in the gorge ===
After a short rest, the detachment descended into the gorge. The Iranians, letting the columns pass by, attacked the Russian rearguard.

As soon as the advanced columns of the Russian detachment drew level with the Oshakan elevation, fire was opened from it on the Russian detachment from four 12-pounder guns. At the same time, large Iranian forces began to press on the left flank of the Russian detachment to prevent the latter from evading the fire of the batteries on the right bank of the Abaran. The Russian guns fired back, covering the columns that moved forward.

By the time Krasovsky's detachment emerged from under the fire of the main batteries that had been shelling it for 17 versts, the Iranians managed to drag six guns across the Abaran ford and install them on the slopes between the river and the road to Echmiadzin. Upon the appearance of the Russian detachment, frequent fire was opened on it from those guns; however, in the place where the road passed higher than the position of the Persian guns, the latter's cannonballs overshot the Russian detachment and inflicted damage on their own cavalry located on the left-bank heights. According to a participant in that battle who was in the rearguard, Captain Sobolev: "…It seemed that these guns were defending the left flank of our columns".

At the same time, 8 Persian guns began to inflict enfilading fire from the rear and from the left flank, focusing strikes on the Russian artillery and train.

=== Exit ===
Up to 10,000 Persian infantry hiding in the ravine advanced toward the height located in front of the gorge exit. Toward the same height on the left side of the gorge, to close the encirclement ring, 5,000 Persian cavalry rushed to join the infantry. To prevent the enemy from joining, two leading columns of the 39th Jaeger Regiment with six guns rushed to the commanding height and managed to climb it ahead of the enemy. With cannon and rifle fire, the jaegers dispersed the ranks of the Persian cavalry, which was forced to retreat back. The infantry stopped on its own but after some time resumed the attack on the Russian columns.

=== Iranian battles with the Russian rearguard ===
Meanwhile, large Iranian forces intensified the pressure on the Russian rearguard. From the elevations occupied by the enemy on both sides of the gorge, constant fire was directed at the Russian units. From Ashtarak, a three-thousand-strong cavalry detachment of Persians crossed the stone bridge over the Abaran and supported the infantry's attack on the Russian rearguard. Two light Russian guns moving between the closing columns of the 40th Jaeger Regiment inflicted tangible damage on the enemy with grapeshot fire, but the Iranians continued to launch fierce attacks one after another. The jaegers continuously fired rifles, and upon the enemy's close approach, engaged in hand-to-hand combat. According to V. A. Potto: "The courage of the soldiers of the fortieth regiment exceeded all imagination", and the remaining four versts to the Echmiadzin plain for the 40th Regiment and the artillery operating with it "were truly terrible". Participant in that battle M. Sobolev wrote that: "The 40th Jaeger Regiment exceeded all measures of bravery". Krasovsky, assuming that the main forces of Abbas Mirza would meet his detachment in front of the monastery, could not allocate reinforcements to the rearguard from the advanced columns.

In the 1st battery company located in the rearguard, the fireworker Osipov was seriously wounded. An enemy cannonball shattered his left arm above the elbow and inflicted a severe contusion to the side. When comrades lifted Osipov to place him on a wagon, the latter, regaining consciousness, refused this service, declaring: "I would rather die beside my gun".

Holding his left arm, which hung by a piece of skin, with his right hand, Osipov continued to march all the way to Echmiadzin.

By 12 o'clock, after a five-hour battle without water under the scorching sun, the soldiers began to weaken and faint from thirst. The jaegers "clustered in groups" and, firing back, perished under the enemy's crossfire. At the same time, the 40th Regiment's losses became increasingly significant with each step.

Seeing the dire situation of the 40th Jaeger Regiment, Krasovsky nevertheless decided to reinforce the rearguard with the Crimean Battalion and himself, together with Major General of the Engineer Troops Truzson, led it into a bayonet attack to give the others time to withdraw behind the trains. Under the last one, a horse was killed. Meanwhile, the guns were seized by the limbers and retreated to the next position.

=== To the Echmiadzin plain ===
==== Russian detachment's movements ====
After occupying he commanding height at the gorge exit, the Russian advanced columns fired at the enemy, covering the approach of the next column, which, ascending the height and relieving the first on the guns, continued firing, covering the approach of the next and the forward movement of the first. Thereafter, the guns were rolled onto rocky knolls on the sides of the road and, after firing two or three shots, advanced further. In this order, Krasovsky's detachment overcame the subsequent heights.

The remaining four versts to the foot of the mountain, beyond which the Echmiadzin plain began, were more rocky and ravined. The artillery, bouncing over stones, moved with difficulty. Steam rose thickly from the horses. The axles of the horse-drawn wagons cracked and the wheels broke. The soldiers had to simultaneously fight and clear the paths of disabled and broken-down provision wagons. The soldiers' fatigue reached literal exhaustion. The gun crews, due to losses, were insufficiently manned for full artillery operations. Many gunners with artillery equipment in their hands fell under their own guns or, leaning on a stone, indifferently rested under the enemy's artillery and rifle fire.

==== Action of Sobolev's two guns (1) ====
On one of the difficult descents, two guns of the 3rd light artillery company under the command of battery commander Captain Sobolev, which were covering the movement of the columns, found themselves in a dangerous position. The guns were under dense grapeshot and rifle fire from different sides. Fearing heavy consequences, Krasovsky headed to those guns to encourage the artillerymen by his presence, but was surprised when he was met by the cheerful and beaming Captain Sobolev in full possession of his spirits. To the order no to retreat under any circumstances, Sobolev replied: "Be calm, Your Excellency! Even twenty Persian guns will not dislodge me!"

After which the latter continued grapeshot fire, inflicting tangible damage on the attacking Iranians, and, having lost most of his men, withdrew from the position only after the passage of the closing columns and receiving the order to do so. Later, Krasovsky wrote that "captain Sobolev, covering a difficult descent with two guns, showed signs of courage and fearlessness worthy of admiration.

==== Battle for the disabled battery gun ====
On one of the hillocks to the left of the road, at a Russian battery gun covering the rearguard's movement, a cannonball shattered the axle. Noticing this, the Iranians in large forces rushed to the disabled and inactive gun, opening a salvo of grapeshot and rifle fire to drive off the cover and capture the valuable trophy. The Russian skirmish line could not withstand the onslaught of the attacking enemy masses and was overturned. The Iranians already occupied the summit 50 paces from the gun. Krasovsky, noticing the confusion of the exhausted jaegers, himself rushed to the gun to inspire the frightened soldiers. The artillery commander of the Guard Colonel Y. Ya. Gillenshmidt, who was with that gun crew, addressed Krasovsky: "Your Excellency! I beg you, leave me with the gun as a sacrifice, but do not expose yourself to such obvious danger. Be assured that we will do everything possible to save the gun".

Krasovsky replied that he would remain with them and, ordering two companies of the 40th Jaeger Regiment under the command of Major Shchegolev to save the guns. The soldiers rushed after Krasovsky into a bayonet attack on the superior enemy forces and, after a bloody battle, managed to halt the Iranian attack. In that battle, Krasovsky himself nearly perished. His horse was killed under him, and when the general transferred to another, a fragment of an enemy grenade shattered his right collarbone, and almost at the same moment, the second horse under Krasovsky was killed. Krasovsky's adjutant, Staff Captain Wrangel, immediately offered the general his horse, but since the adjutant needed it to perform his duties, Krasovsky refused and accepted the horse offered by Lieutenant Pozhidayev, who was with the 40th Regiment. During the time the hand-to-hand battle was raging, the soldiers managed to transfer the gun to a spare carriage. Due to the received wound, Krasovsky could no longer mount the horse independently, and the jaegers helped him do so.

==== Battle of the 1st Battalion of the 40th Jaeger Regiment ====
Meanwhile, at the gun of the 3rd light company located with the 1st Battalion of the 40th Jaeger Regiment, ammunition was running out, and the Iranians intensified the pressure. The battalion commander, Major Shchegolev, received bullet wounds to the head and leg. About this situation, Krasovsky was soon reported by the battalion adjutant, Lieutenant Simanovsky. Krasovsky immediately headed to the battalion and found the soldiers defending under the enemy's cross rifle and cannon fire. The Iranians were already 100 paces away. Krasovsky shouted: "Why aren't they firing? Fire grapeshot!" But the fireworker Kovrygin at that gun calmly replied, that he had only two grapeshot charges left, and was saving them in case of self-destruction was needed. A box of ammunition was immediately brought to the gun, and with grapeshot fire, the Iranians were driven back beyond the heights. The gun crew left the position after receiving the order.

==== Action of Sobolev's two guns (2) ====
Meanwhile, Captain Sobolev with two light guns occupied a convenient position to the left of the road and opened fire on the enemy attempting to dislodge the left skirmish line covering the marching columns.

Krasovsky noticed how part of the Persian cavalry from the right side crossed the road and disappeared behind the ridge to the left of the road. The general carefully surveyed the battlefield and discovered that in the direction where the Persian cavalry had rushed, two light Russian guns protruded far forward and, with a small cover of 35 men, repelled the Iranian attacks. Krasovsky with 30 jaegers rushed to those guns and, arriving at the place, ordered one more shot and to withdraw, but by that time the Persian cavalry had already appeared in close proximity to the Russian position. Significantly ahead of his cavalry, a certain Persian commander with a red banner, dressed in a red cloak, halted on the hill. Dismounting, Krasovsky led the jaegers to that hill in a bayonet attack. The Persians, firing several shots at the attackers, turned their horses and galloped along the hilly ridge located along the left flank of the Russian columns. Sobolev's guns fired a grapeshot salvo after the departing cavalry, after which they were rolled back to the next elevation.

==== Akop Arutyunov's Persian gun ====
Report of Maj. Gen. Prince Chavchavadze to Count Paskevich, 21 May 1828, No. 539

Resident of Nurni village in the Erivan province, Armenian Akop Arutyunov, who served as a topchi (artilleryman) in the army of Abbas Mirza, during the battle of 17 August, was noticed in the false direction of cannon shots, so that they struck not the Russian, but the Persian army.
The aforementioned Arutyunov, learning that his actions were noticed, left the battlefield at the same time, but had the misfortune to be caught not far from the Echmiadzin Monastery, and the Erivan sardar Husayn Khan gouged out his eyes and cut off his nose, lips, and heels.
This barbarism, making Arutyunov a pitiful sufferer for life, forced his entire family to endure extreme lack of sustenance. The position of Arutyunov and the act for which he suffered so much are especially worthy of the government's mercy, and I venture to intercede with Your Excellency for the appointment of a maintenance for him that could protect his family from the poverty undeserved by him.

In the midst of the battle, one Armenian, a resident of the village of Nurni in the Erivan province, serving the Persians as a topchi (artilleryman—bombardier) —Akop Arutyunov— turned the barrel of his gun (of English manufacture) and opened fire on the Iranians attacking the Russian columns, thereby allowing one of the Russian subunits to avoid the destruction threatened by the Iranians. Arutyunov's actions were soon discovered, and noticing this, the latter fled the battlefield but was caught not far from the monastery. The Erivan sardar Husayn Khan ordered Arutyunov's eyes to be gouged out and his nose, lips, ears, and heels to be cut off, after which the latter was thrown in front of the monastery among the dead. However, he remained alive.

=== Last elevation ===
Approaching the last elevation, beyond which the Echmiadzin plain began, Krasovsky ordered the advanced columns to occupy positions on the flanks and let the train columns pass forward. The central columns were also ordered, occupying flank positions, to await the approach of the struggling rearguard and ascend the mountain together with it. From the elevation, the Echmiadzin plain opened up before the detachment, where a clash with the enemy's main forces was expected. The plain served as an excellent platform for the deployed actions of the Persian cavalry. Having awaited the approach of the closing columns, Krasovsky ordered the guns to be placed in the center, and the train still intact by that time was left under the rearguard's cover. Ahead of the entire detachment in a stole and with a cross in his hands went the priest of the Crimean Regiment, Father Fedotov. From the right side, from behind a rocky hillock, Persian infantry rushed out. One horse-Cossack and two light guns were immediately unlimbered and opened grapeshot fire on the enemy, after which the latter retreated back beyond the heights.

The Persian artillery, ascending the last elevation, stopped. Fatigue began to affect the Persian army as well. The infantry and artillery moved with difficulty. The cavalry horses were exhausted.

But despite this, the Persian cavalry intensified the pressure on the left flank and rear of the Russian rearguard, which by its position shielded the enemy from the Russian batteries. According to Captain Sobolev: "Our soldiers, from complete exhaustion, some fired sporadically, others could barely carry their rifles, and the third fell unconscious to the ground".

Assessing this situation, the Persian horsemen crashed into the Russian ranks, but despite the latter's fatigued state, the Iranians, suffering heavy losses, retreated back and after a short interval continued to launch new attacks.

=== In the Echmiadzin Monastery ===
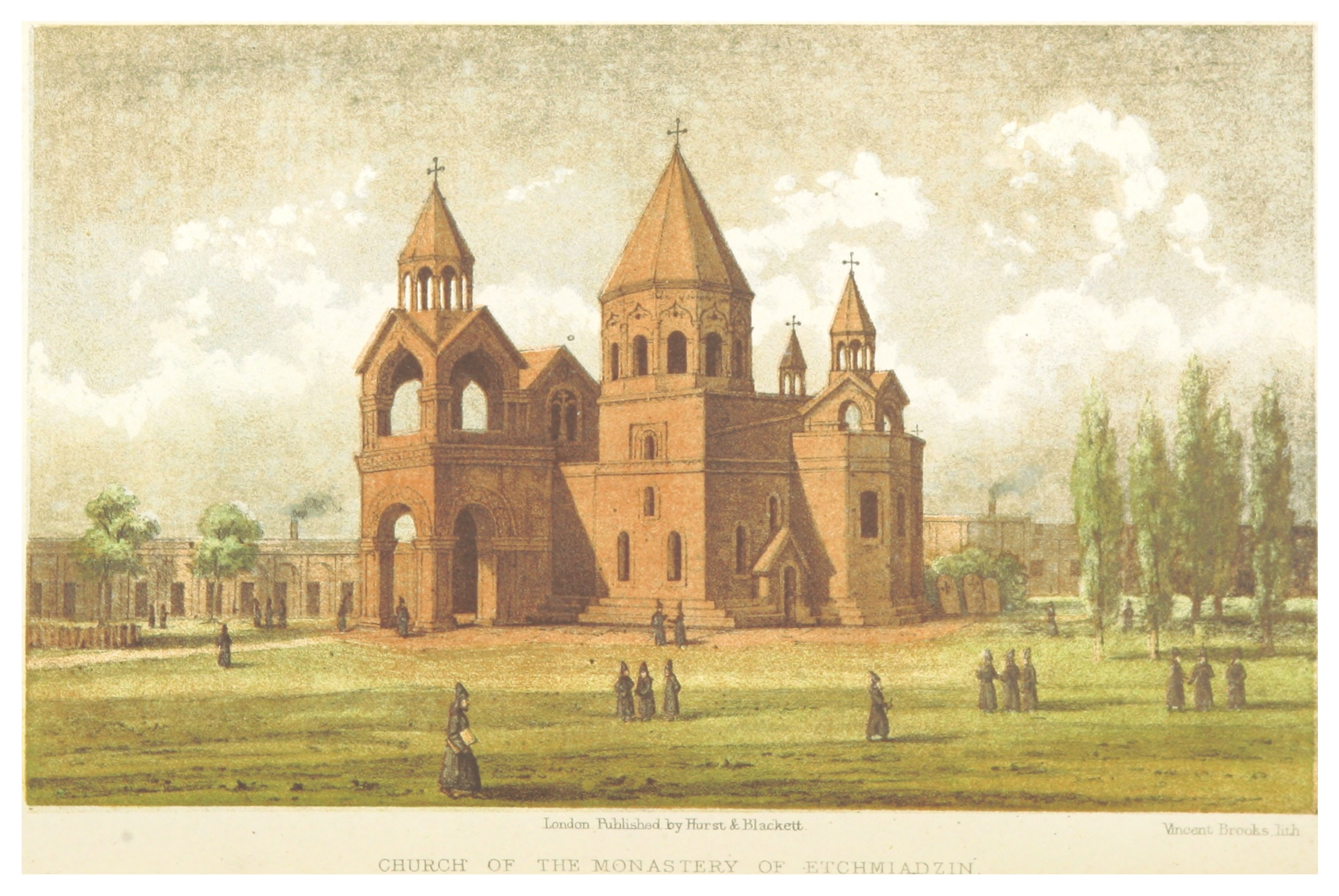
Etchmiadzin Cathedral

Throughout the battle, those in the monastery experienced heavy moments of doubt. From the bell tower, the monastic monk Father Joseph "with horror watched how two thousand Russian warriors fought, surrounded by the thirty-thousand-strong army of Abbas Mirza himself".

During the battle, the Echmiadzin archbishop Nerses Ashtaraketsi (future Catholicos of All Armenians), raising high the monastery's relic —Roman spear stained with the blood of Christ— together with the entire flock, knelt and prayed for the victory of the "Russian host". According to one of the eyewitnesses: "It was touching to see this spectacle, not only the entire people and soldiers, but also the sick and wounded crawled to the monastery church and prayed".

=== On the Echmiadzin plain ===
==== Ambush ====
In the valley in front of the monastery, for irrigating the meadows, canals fed from the Abaran river ran. Knowing that after a 12-hour march (of which 9 hours with fighting) under the scorching sun and without a drop of water, the Russian detachment experienced unquenchable thirst, the Persian cavalry set up an ambush opposite one of the canals running not far from the road.

==== At the water canal ====
Krasovsky's detachment descended into the valley and stood in combat order, awaiting the rearguard's consolidation. The riflemen and Cossacks on the flanks were ordered to join the columns, but most of the former, disregarding the danger, rushed to the ditch with water. The soldiers, throwing aside their rifles, threw themselves into the water. The Persian cavalry immediately poured out of the ambush onto the soldiers separated from the column and began to hack them. According to Captain Sobolev: "The soldiers more readily parted with their lives than with a sip of warm and muddy water".

The Cossacks, due to their small numbers, could not break through to help the riflemen. The Iranians took no prisoners. Their horsemen surrounded a Russian soldier three or four at a time and cut off his head. They beheaded the living and the dead, after which they tied the heads into saddlebags and "with those trophies" returned to receive the due 10 chervonets for a Russian head. (Note: Before the battle, Abbas Mirza promised a reward of 10 chervonets for each Russian head. Subsequently, most of the bodies of Russian soldiers were found beheaded.) The English historian P. M. Sykes notes that it was precisely then, when the Persians "were cutting off the heads of their enemies", that precious time was lost for the complete destruction of the Russian detachment. After beheading a Russian soldier, disputes accompanied by fights over his head occurred among the Iranians themselves.

Krasovsky attempted to break through to the perishing riflemen, but, having separated far from the columns, he himself fell into encirclement. Many riflemen near the general were hacked down. Krasovsky himself with difficulty fended off with a thin officer's sword. The auditor with him, Belyov, "a man of remarkable strength and bravery", managed to break through the ranks of the attacking Iranians and report to the regimental ataman of the Don Sergeev Regiment Shurupov, who was nearby, about the critical situation of the detachment commander. Shurupov, together with Belyov and 30 Don Cossacks (according to other sources—with 50), with a swift attack with pikes and sabers broke the encirclement ring from outside, exterminating many Kurdins in the process, thereby saving Krasovsky and the several officers and soldiers with him, "who were unable to defend themselves due to lack of cartridges and complete exhaustion of their strength".

==== The Russian detachment's surrounding ====
Meanwhile, Abbas Mirza ordered Krasovsky's detachment to be surrounded on open ground and, blocking the road, to attack it with all forces. The position of the Russian detachment became critical. By that time, all grapeshot charges were expended, and the exhausted soldiers with difficulty repelled the fierce attacks of the Persian infantry and cavalry from all sides. But unexpectedly, to aid Krasovsky's detachment, from the monastery came out a battalion of Sevastopol men and a mounted Armenian hundred. The Iranians, fearing to be caught between two fires, recoiled to the sides.

==== The Russian detachment's break ====
At the moment when the road was cleared of the enemy, Krasovsky's detachment in panic rushed to the monastery gates. The artillery, not hoping for cover, galloped to the monastery. Behind it, in complete disorder, rushed all the rest. The rearguard mixed with the other units. From the monastery towers, cannon fire was opened on the enemy pursuing the fugitives. In attempting to restore order, the commander of the Crimean Infantry Regiment, Lieutenant Colonel Golovin, perished. He received three bullet wounds and died on the spot.

In the ensuing catastrophe, the commander of the Sevastopol Infantry Regiment, Major Belozor, perished. According to participant Sobolev's account: the staff officer died. The latter, even in the previous battles, gave his horse to a seriously wounded officer who later survived, and he himself became exhausted, and two carbineers had to help him walk. The latter also began to lose strength and significantly lagged behind their own. Belozor sat on a stone, took out his wallet with money, and, extending it to the soldier. The Iranians rushed at the Russian officer sitting on the stone and, tearing off his epaulettes, beheaded him. The commander of the 40th Jaeger Regiment, Lieutenant Colonel Shuisky, received a through-and-through bullet wound to the arm, but despite the wound, until the end tried to hold the formation.

==== At the monastery's walls ====
Having reached the monastery walls, the soldiers fell into the shade. When all the remaining columns reached the gates and the order was given to enter the monastery, five jaegers, embracing their rifles, remained lying. Without wounds or contusions, the soldiers died of exhaustion. Not a single cartridge remained in their pouches.

The remnants of the Russian detachment entered the monastery to the sound of bells and prayer chants. The Echmiadzin Archbishop Nerses Ashtaraketsi addressed everyone with a welcoming speech: "A handful of Russian brothers broke through to us through the thirty-thousand-strong army of enraged enemies. This handful has earned itself immortal glory, and the name of General Krasovsky will forever remain unforgettable in the annals of Echmiadzin".

== Krasovsky, Laptev and Shvetsov's union ==
After the Echmiadzin Monastery's occupation, Krasovsky immediately sent six local Armenians to the camp at Jenguli at different times with instructions that, upon the arrival of the siege artillery, Major General Laptev, together with Colonel Shvetsov's 80th Kabardian Infantry Regiment and four battery guns, was to advance to Echmiadzin. It was agreed to halt short of Oshakan on the heights and fire two shots from each gun. In response, shots were to sound from the monastery. These actions were to serve as the signal for Krasovsky to advance, in order to inflict defeat on the Persian army caught between two fires or to compel it to retreat.

Two of the six scouts sent by Krasovsky were captured, and Abbas Mirza, learning of the enemy's intentions, on 31 August 1827 withdrew his troops across the Zanga River and encamped on a position impregnable by nature, 20 versts from Erivan and 15 versts from the Russian camp at Jenguli, meanwhile surrounding his camp with a retrenchment.

On 30 August 1827, the siege artillery with a supply train consisting of nearly 2,000 carts and wagons arrived at the camp at Jenguli. Laptev carried out Krasovsky's instructions precisely, and on the night of 1 September 1827, having ascended the designated height, signaled with cannon shots. However, in the monastery they did not know that Abbas Mirza had withdrawn his troops across the Zanga River, and they were surprised that Laptev had reached the designated place without firefights, assuming it possible that all the scouts sent by Krasovsky had been intercepted and the Iranians had set up an ambush. In turn, Laptev, not hearing the answering cannon shots, assumed that the monastery had been taken by the Iranians and Krasovsky's detachment annihilated. Finding himself in a difficult situation, Laptev decided after 10 minutes to fire repeated shots. This time the monastery finally responded in kind, and Krasovsky, leaving the entire 40th Jaeger Regiment in the monastery, set out to meet Laptev and, having joined the latter, in the morning headed to the camp at Jenguli.

== Consequences ==
After the battles that had taken place, in attempts to stop and destroy Krasovsky's detachment, Abbas Mirza's troops were demoralized to a certain degree. Under the pretext of transporting the wounded to the fortress and villages and burying the dead, Abbas Mirza found himself short of the majority of his army.

The invasion of the Persian army forced Paskevich to change the further plan of action for the Persian campaign. In the second half of August, Paskevich planned to invade Azerbaijan with the main forces and advance on Tabriz. Upon receiving news of the invasion of the Persian army into the Erivan Khanate, Paskevich considered that only part of the Persian forces had invaded there and that Major General Krasovsky's detachment was capable of dealing with the enemy on its own, but on 8 September 1827 a detailed report on the Ashtarak (Oshakan) battle arrived, and Paskevich immediately ordered the Imperial Russian Army's Life Guards Combined, Georgian Grenadier, Shirvan Infantry, 7th Carabiner, Chuhuiv Uhlan, Nizhny Novgorod Dragoon, and the Don Cossack regiments of Ilovaisky, Shamsev, and Karpov, with 30 guns, to assemble in Nakhichevan and, under his command, to advance with combined forces to assist Krasovsky's detachment. Abbas Mirza, without accepting battle, withdrew across the Aras and encamped 45 versts from Sardarabad at the Kara-Kala fortification. On 5 September 1827, Paskevich arrived in Echmiadzin, and on 19 September 1827 he demanded from Krasovsky a detailed explanation regarding what had occurred. The next day, Krasovsky provided the report.

On 26 September 1827, the Russian troops besieged Sardarabad, and two days later the siege artillery arrived there. On 30 September 1827, the bombardment began, and on the night of 2 October 1827 (O.S. 20 September 1827), the Persian garrison abandoned the citadel.

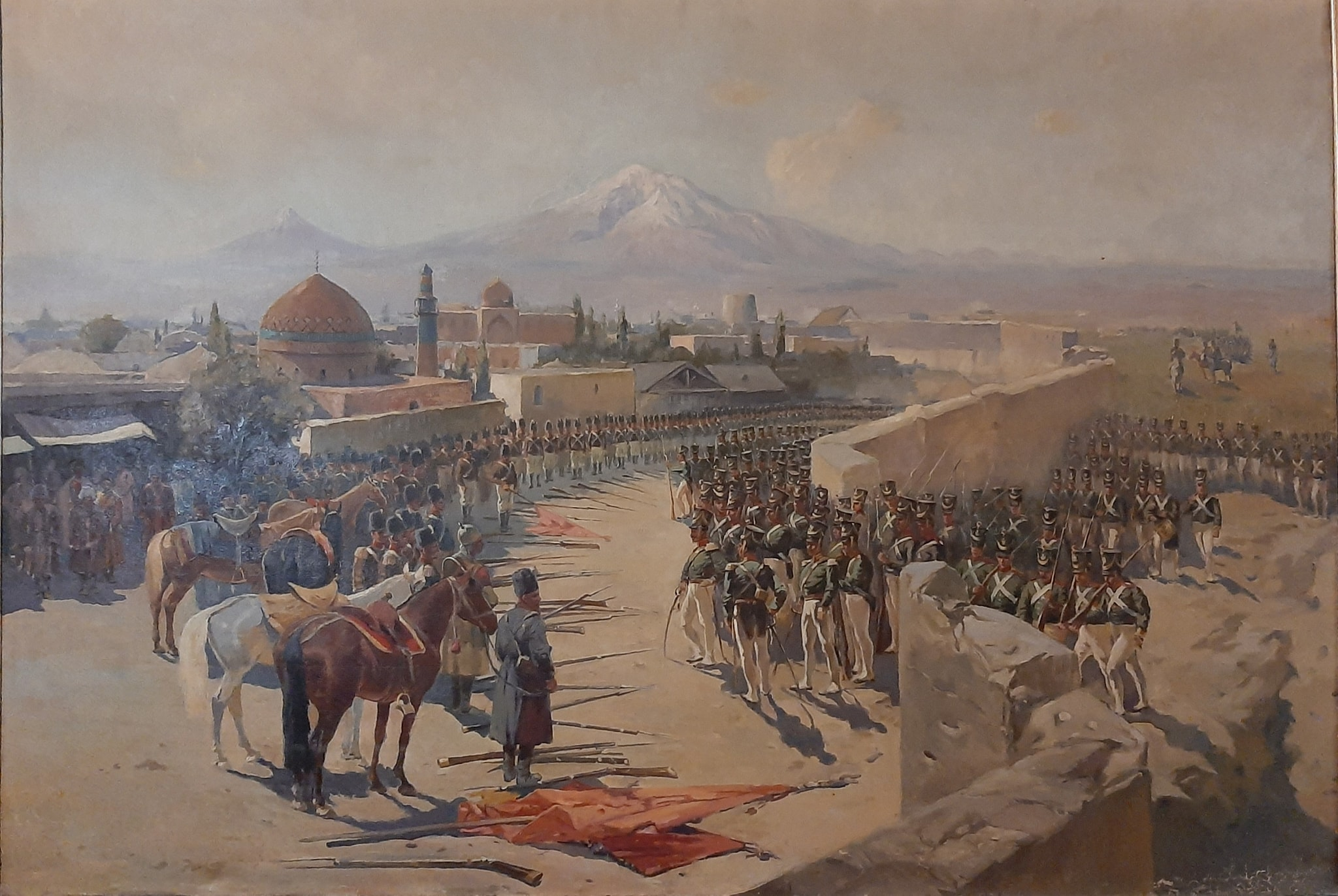
Capture of the Erivan Fortress by Russian troops by Franz Roubaud (1893)

On 6 October 1827, after a reconnaissance had been conducted, a plan for the capture of Erivan was developed at a military council. While advancing on Erivan, Paskevich entrusted command of the troops in Nakhichevan to Lieutenant General Prince G. Ye. Eristov. His assistant was appointed Colonel N. N. Muravyov. Abbas Mirza decided to take advantage of the small number of the remaining Russian grouping and capture Nakhichevan. But by the time the Persian vanguard was already 7 versts from the Nakhichevan region, reinforcements —up to 4,000 infantry and 2,000 cavalry— arrived to Eristov, after which Abbas Mirza's troops were driven back across the Aras.

Meanwhile, on the night of 8 October 1827, siege works began under the Erivan fortress, and on 10 October 1827, fire was opened on it from 14 siege guns. On 13 October 1827, Erivan capitulated.

At that time, Abbas Mirza with all his forces was under Khoy. After the news of the capture of Erivan by the Russian troops, the Persian army was practically demoralized. Eristov's detachment was at that time in Chors. The lack of provisions forced Eristov to return to Nakhichevan, but Muravyov convinced the prince to advance on Tabriz. On 12 October 1827 the Russian detachment crossed the Aras and invaded Azerbaijan. Without encountering resistance on its path, the detachment occupied the city of Marand. On 15 October 1827, the Russian vanguard under Muravyov's command entered Tabriz without a fight, and on 31 October 1827, Paskevich himself arrived there.

On 22 February 1828, the Treaty of Turkmenchay followed, as a result of which part of Eastern Armenia (the Erivan and Nakhichevan khanates) was annexed to Russia.

== Memory ==
=== Establishment of the monument (1833–1834) ===
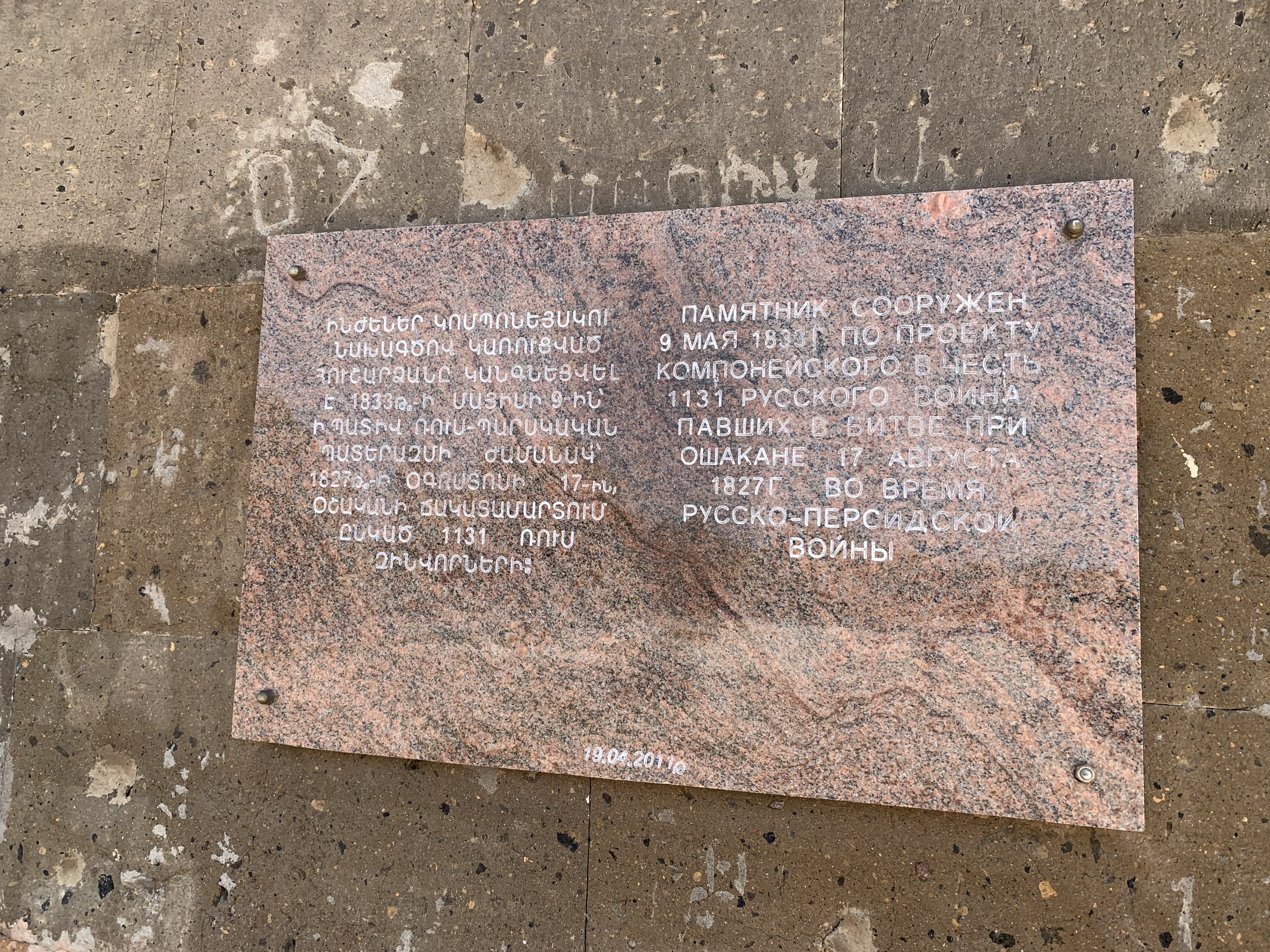

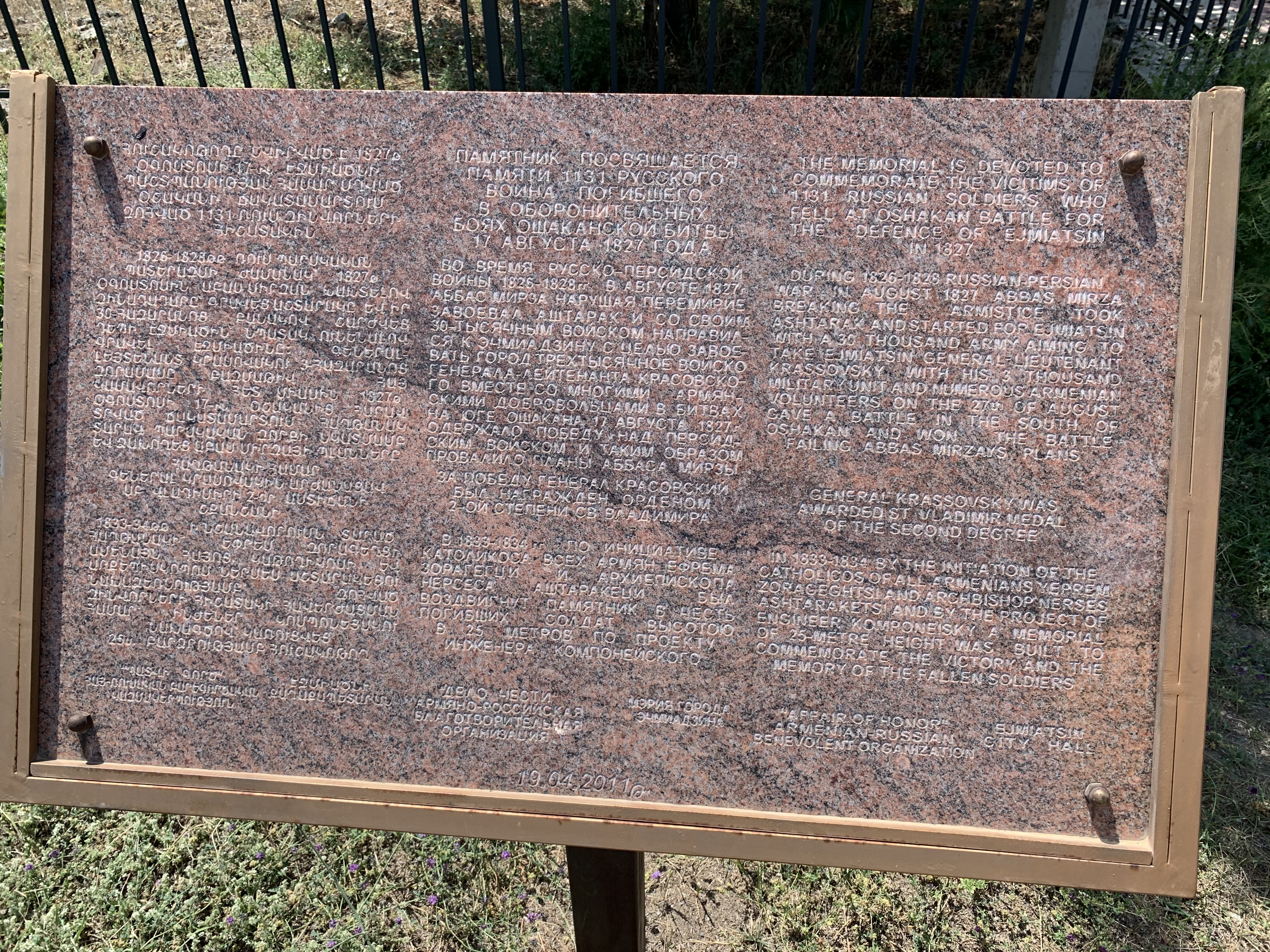
Memorial inscriptions

After the Battle of Oshakan, Nerses Ashtaraketsi and General Krasovsky conceived the idea to erect a monument To the Russian soldier-saviors of the First-Throned Echmiadzin. However, due to frictions with Count Paskevich, both were forced to leave Eastern Armenia for a time.

In 1831, Catholicos of All Armenians Yeprem I Zoragetsi raised the question of erecting a monument, appealing to Lieutenant General N. P. Pankratev. The latter, in turn, sent Prince A. I. Chernyshev a letter of the following content:

Letter from Lieutenant General Pankratev to Count Chernyshev, in St. Petersburg, dated 6 August 1831, No. 905:

The Patriarch Ephraim, desiring to preserve in memory the valor of the Russian warriors who fell for the salvation of Echmiadzin on 17 August 1827, asks for my intercession to petition for permission for him to erect, at the expense of the monastery, a monument to these warriors 4 versts from Echmiadzin, between the monastery and the village of Oshakan. On copper plates inset into the pedestal, the patriarch wishes to designate the names of the chief and other unit commanders, as well as the designations of the regiments and artillery that were in the composition of the troops that fought on 17 August 1827 for the salvation of the Echmiadzin Monastery.

Having the honor to present herewith for consideration a drawing of this proposed monument, I request Your Excellency to seek the Greatest Imperial consent for its construction.

In 1833, according to the project of Engineer-Lieutenant Kompaneysky, construction of the memorial obelisk began 4 kilometers from Echmiadzin on the path to Oshakan. The monument was installed on 9 May 1834.

The monument was constructed from local red tuff and has a height of 25 meters. Inset into the pedestal were copper plates inscribed with the names of the commanders of the military units, regiments, and artillery who "fought on the day of 17 August for the salvation of the Echmiadzin shrine".

The patriarch approved 17 August as the celebration of the liberation of the monastery. Annually on this day, the entire Echmiadzin clergy performed a cross procession to the monument and served a panikhida "for the warriors killed in the battle".

=== Memorial complex inauguration (2011) ===
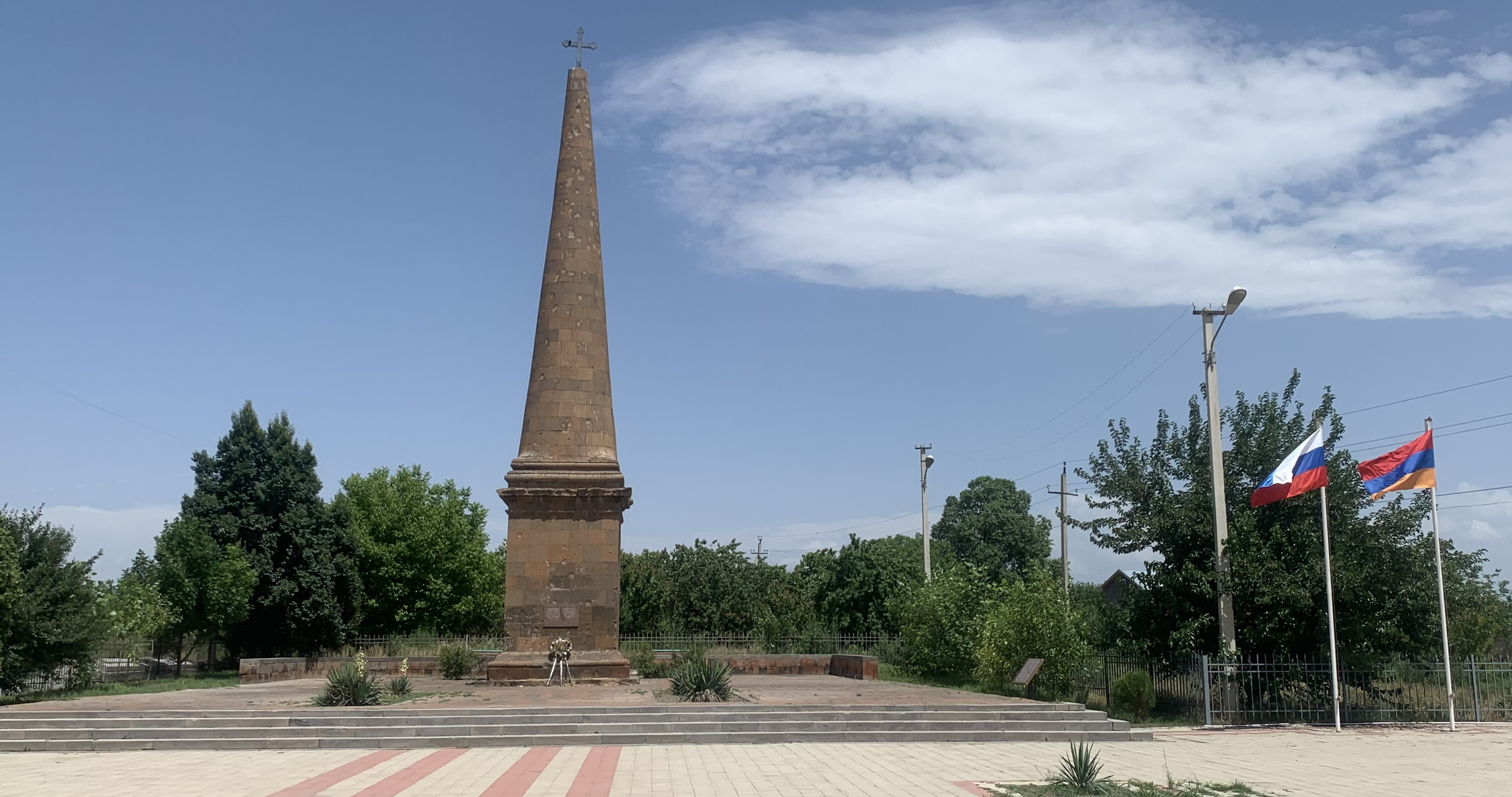
Obelisk commemorating the memory of the Russian soldiers who participated in the Oshakan battle, near Echmiadzin

In 2009, at the initiative of the Ambassador of Russia to Armenia V. Ye. Kovalenko, the Oshakan memorial began to be developed. The work was carried out by the Russian-Armenian charitable organization Delo chesti under the co-chairmanship of the head of the Rossotrudnichestvo representative office in Armenia V. V. Krivopuskov and the president of the international youth center A. O. Nikogosyan.

On 19 April 2011, a solemn ceremony of the opening of the Oshakan memorial complex took place. The ceremony was attended by the head of the Administration of the President of Russia Sergei Naryshkin, who was on a visit to Armenia, and the head of the Apparatus of the President of Armenia Karen Karapetyan.

Ministers and heads of administrations of Russia and Armenia who participated in the "First Russian-Armenian Interregional Forum" taking place in Yerevan on 18–20 April were also present at the opening.

From the morning, hundreds of residents from the surrounding villages and the city of Echmiadzin came with live flowers to lay them at the memorial to the fallen warriors.

Sergei Naryshkin, thanking on behalf of the Russian people the leadership and people of Armenia for their careful attitude to the memory of the Russian liberator warriors, said: "I am sincerely glad to be present at the opening of this majestic monument to the Russian soldiers who gave their lives for the liberation of Armenia".

Inauguration

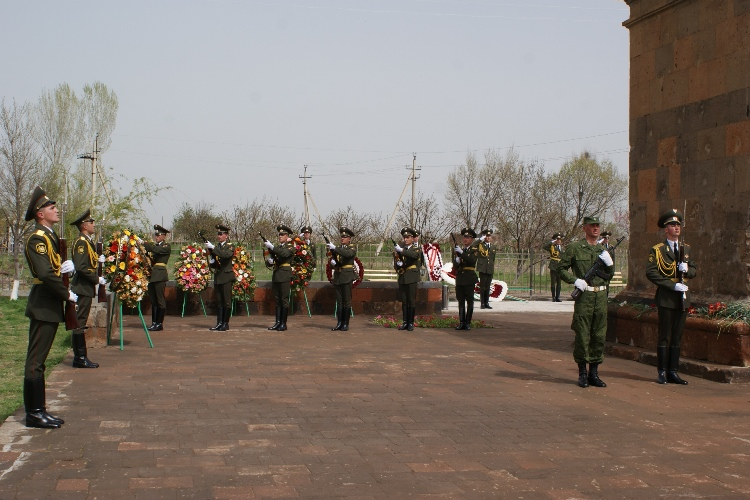

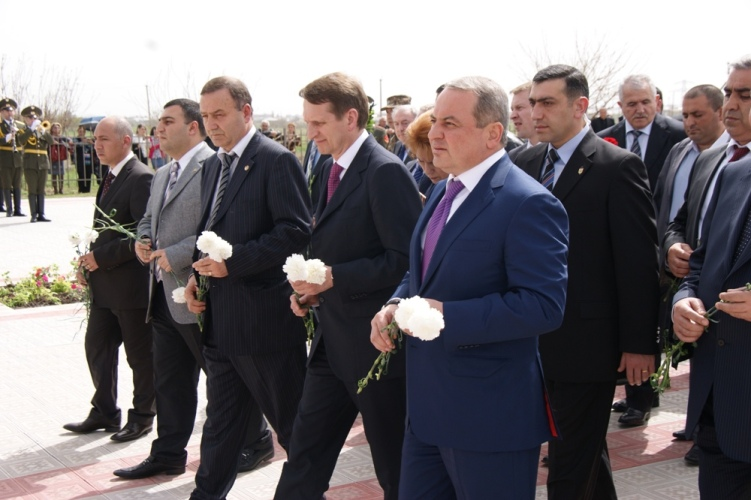

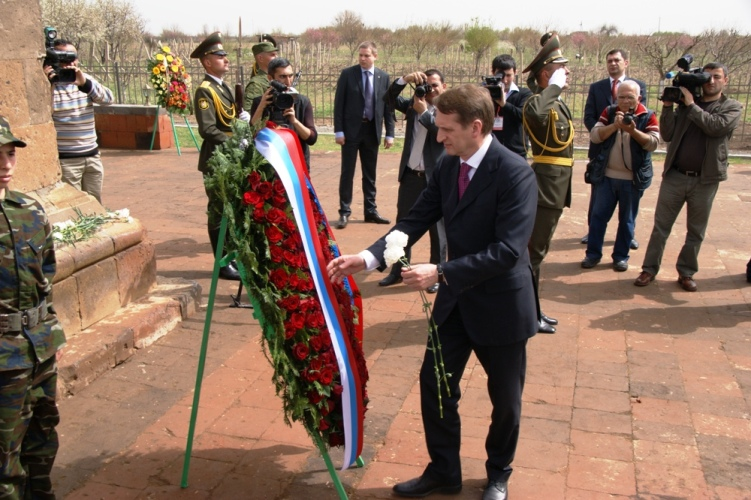
Monument in 2024

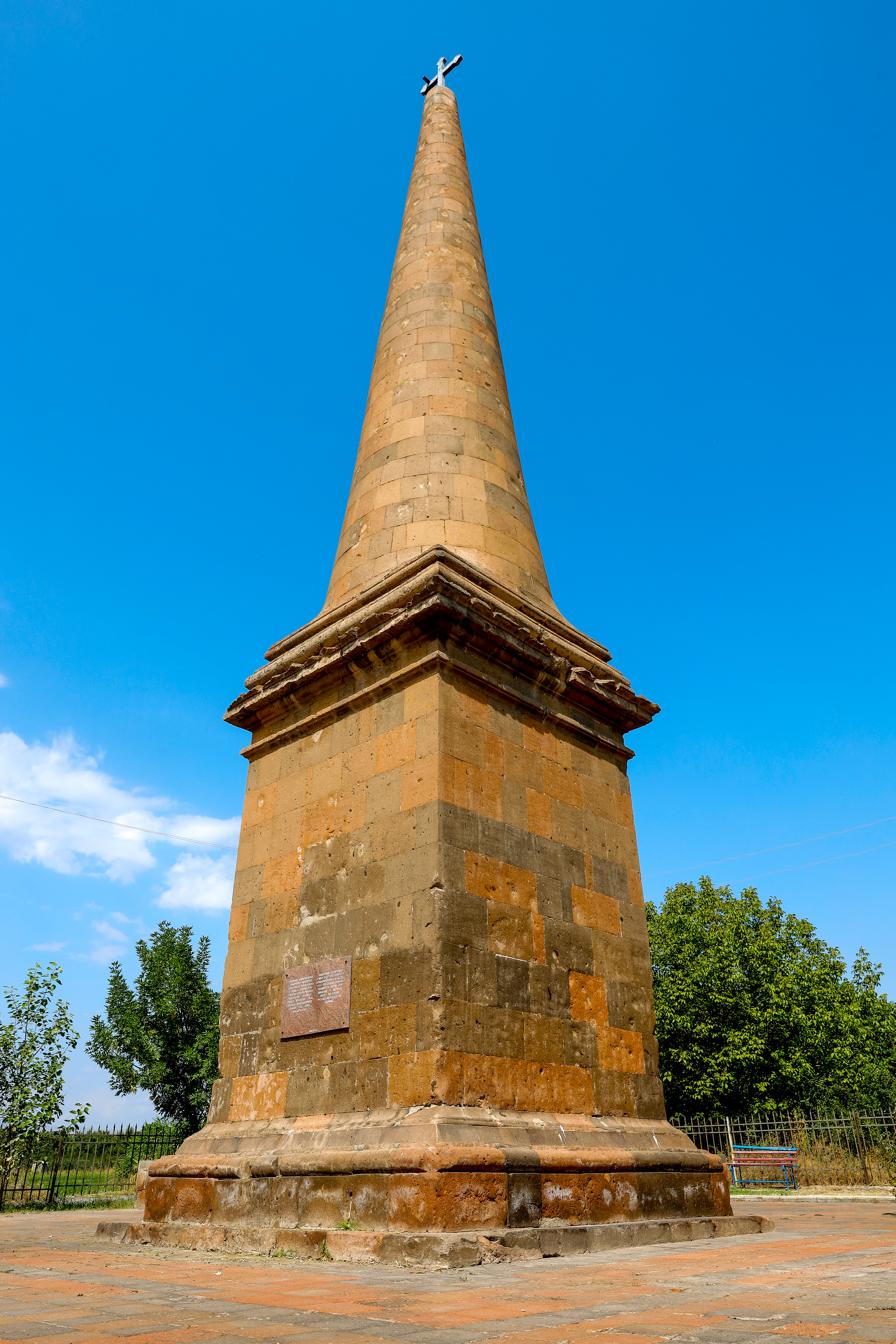

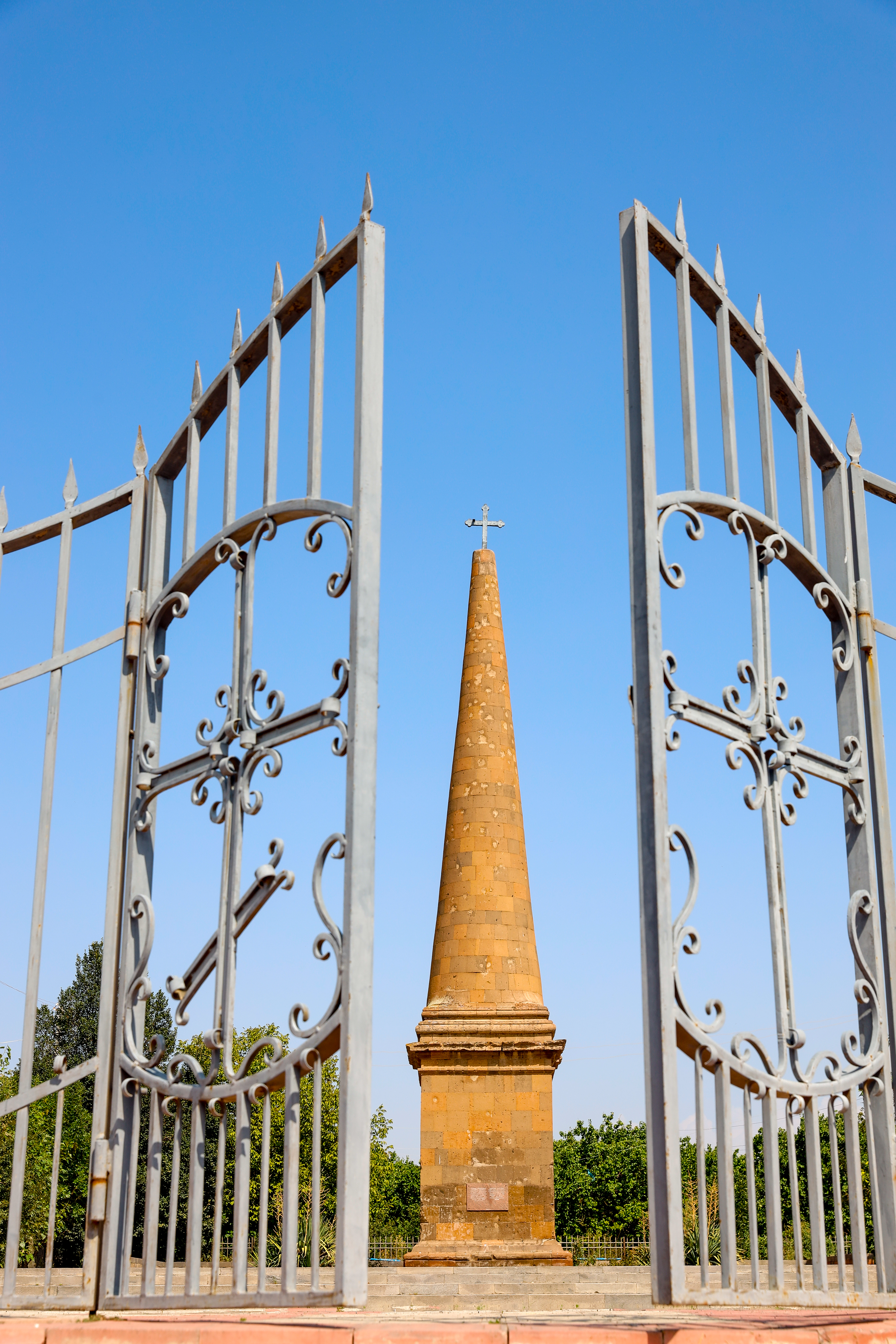

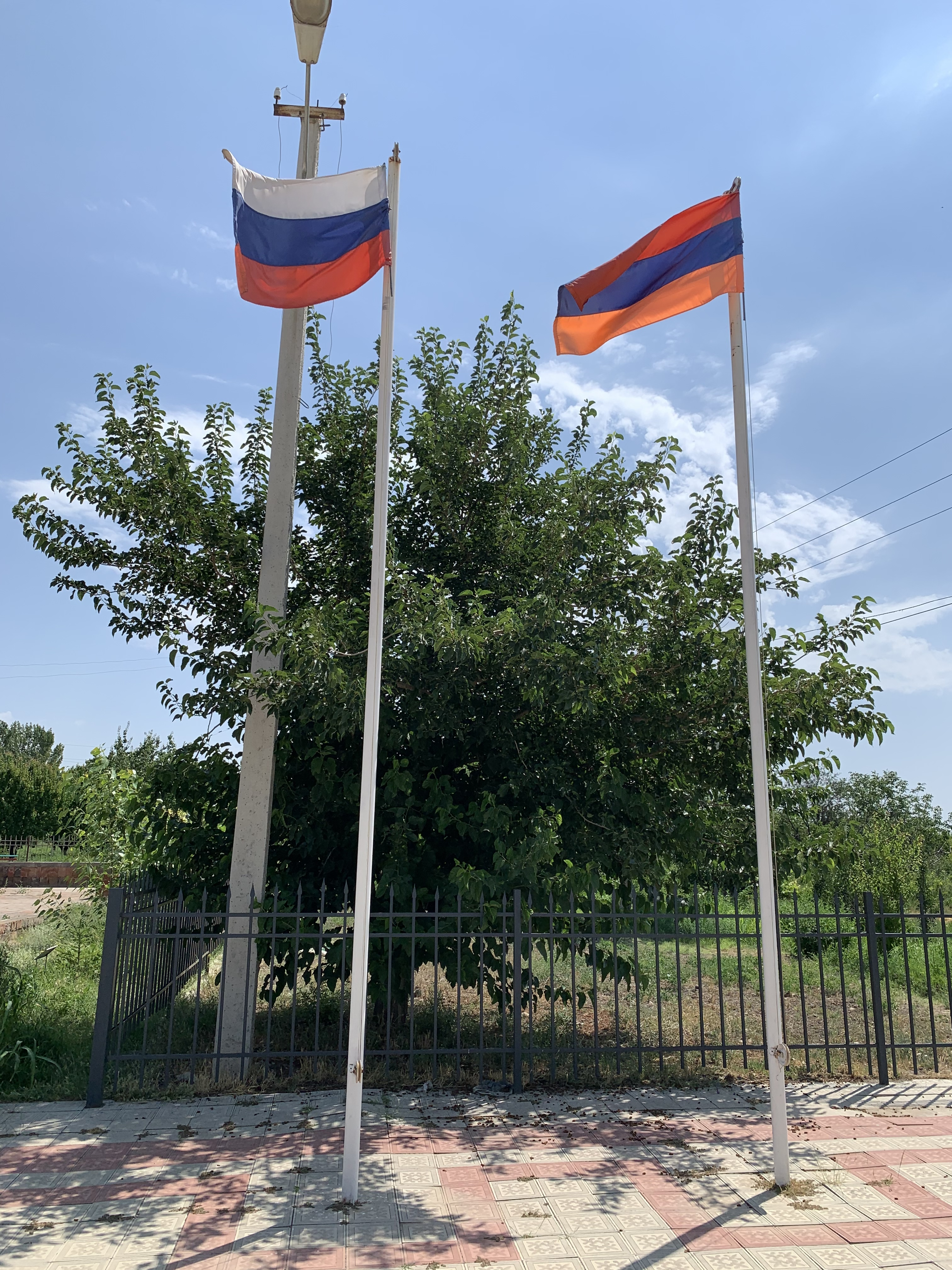
