= Twentieth of the month =

Recurring ordinal calendar date

The twentieth of the month or twentieth day of the month is the recurring calendar date position corresponding to the day numbered 20 of each month. In the Gregorian calendar (and other calendars that number days sequentially within a month), this day occurs in every month of the year, and therefore occurs twelve times per year.

- Twentieth of January
- Twentieth of February
- Twentieth of March
- Twentieth of April
- Twentieth of May
- Twentieth of June
- Twentieth of July
- Twentieth of August
- Twentieth of September
- Twentieth of October
- Twentieth of November
- Twentieth of December

In addition to these dates, this date occurs in months of many other calendars, such as the Bengali calendar and the Hebrew calendar.

== See also ==
- Twentieth (disambiguation)
- Twentieth of July, a 1947 novella by the Austrian writer Alexander Lernet-Holenia
