= Jan Smit discography =

- Studio albums: 24
- Compilation albums: 3
- Singles: 33
- Live albums: 3

Dutch recording artist Jan Smit has released 24 studio albums, three compilation albums, three live albums and 33 singles since 1997. Most of his albums are Dutch, but he released also a few German albums. His singles and albums have charted in Flanders, Austria, Switzerland and Germany; however, Smit is the most successful in his own country the Netherlands.

== Albums ==
=== Studio albums ===
==== Dutch albums ====
List of albums, with selected chart positions and certifications
Title	Album details	Peak chart positions		Certifications
Title	Album details	NLD	BEL (FLA)	Certifications
Ik zing dit lied voor jou alleen	Released: 26 April 1997; Label: Mercury	1	1	BEA: Platinum; NVPI: 2× Platinum
Kerstmis met Jantje Smit	Released: 15 November 1997; Label: Mercury	4	18	NVPI: Gold
Het land van mijn dromen	Released: 16 May 1998; Label: Mercury	2	31	NVPI: Gold
Jantje Smit	Released: 17 April 1999; Label: Koch Universal	7	44	
Jan Smit 2000	Released: 20 May 2000; Label: Koch Universal	32	—	
Zing en lach	Released: 31 August 2001; Label: Koch Universal	33	—	
Zonder jou	Released: 7 September 2002; Label: Koch Universal	40	—	
Op eigen benen	Released: 20 September 2003; Label: Koch Universal	45	—	
jansmit.com	Released: 22 April 2005; Label: Artist & Company	1	22	NVPI: 3× Platinum
Op weg naar geluk	Released: 15 September 2006; Label: Artist & Company	1	12	BEA: Gold; NVPI: 3× Platinum
Stilte in de storm	Released: 29 August 2008; Label: Artist & Company	1	5	BEA: Gold; NVPI: 3× Platinum
Leef	Released: 26 March 2010; Label: Artist & Company	1	25	NVPI: Platinum
Vrienden	Released: 13 August 2012; Label: VoSound	1	1	BEA: Gold; NVPI: Platinum
Jij & ik	Released: 22 August 2014; Label: VoSound	1	7	NVPI: Platinum
Kerst voor iedereen	Released: 6 November 2015; Label: VoSound	4	13	
20	Released: 16 September 2016; Label: VoSound	1	5	
"—" denotes items which were not released in that country or failed to chart.

==== German albums ====
List of albums, with selected chart positions and certifications
Title	Album details	Peak chart positions					Certifications
Title	Album details	NLD	AUT	BEL (FLA)	GER	SWI	Certifications
Weihnachten mit Jantje Smit	Released: 15 November 1997; Label: Mercury	—	37	—	—	—	
Jeder braucht ein bißchen Glück	Released: 17 April 1999; Label: Koch Universal	—	47	—	—	—	BVMI: Gold
Ein bisschen Liebe	Released: 3 September 2000; Label: Koch Universal	—	4	—	10	30	BVMI: Gold; IFPI AUT: Gold
Sing und lach mit mir	Released: 31 August 2001; Label: Koch Universal	—	21	—	22	48	
Die goldenen Stimmen (with George Baker and Piet Veerman)	Released: 8 July 2002; Label: Koch Universal	—	—	—	—	—	
Hallo Engel	Released: 1 September 2002; Label: Koch Universal	—	15	—	35	—	
Für alle	Released: 22 September 2003; Label: Koch Universal	—	35	—	74	—	
Bewegend	Released: 18 October 2004; Label: Koch Universal	—	58	—	86	—	
Nicht nur davon träumen	Released: 15 September 2006; Label: Koch Universal	—	—	—	—	—	
Ich bin da	Released: 28 June 2013; Label: Ariola	13	19	64	42	—	
"—" denotes items which were not released in that country or failed to chart.

=== Compilation albums ===
==== Dutch albums ====
List of compilation albums with selected chart positions
Title	Album details	Peak chart positions		Certifications
Title	Album details	NLD	BEL (FLA)	Certifications
Het beste van Jantje Smit	Released: 18 June 2004; Label: Universal Music	—	—	
15 jaar hits	Released: 28 October 2011; Label: Artist & Company	3	7	BEA: Platinum; NVPI: Platinum
Recht uit m'n hart - Ballades	Released: 30 January 2015; Label: Artist & Company	1	12	
"—" denotes items which were not released in that country or failed to chart.

==== German albums ====
List of compilation albums with selected chart positions
Title	Album details	Peak chart positions	
Title	Album details	AUT	GER
Das Beste von Jantje Smit - Rosen für Mamatschi	Released: 26 March 2004; Label: Koch Universal	68	68
"—" denotes items which were not released in that country or failed to chart.

=== Live albums ===
==== Dutch albums ====
List of live albums, with selected chart positions and certifications
Title	Album details	Peak chart positions		Certifications
Title	Album details	NLD	BEL (FLA)	Certifications
Live '09 - Jan Smit komt naar je toe tour 08/09	Released: 1 May 2009; Label: Artist & Company	5	46	NVPI: Platinum
Live in Ahoy - Jubileumconcert 2012	Released: 28 February 2013; Label: Artist & Company	1	14	
Unplugged (De Rockfeld Sessies)	Released: 25 October 2013; Label: VoSound	1	13	NVPI: Gold
"—" denotes items which were not released in that country or failed to chart.

== Singles ==
=== As lead artist ===
List of singles, with selected chart positions and certifications, showing year released and album name
Title	Year	Peak chart positions			Certifications	Album
Title	Year	NL Top 40	NL Top 100	BEL (FLA)	Certifications	Album
"Ik zing dit lied voor jou alleen"	1997	1	1	1	NVPI: 2× Platinum	Ik zing dit lied voor jou alleen
"Pappie, waar blijf je nou?"	1997	9	25	40		Ik zing dit lied voor jou alleen
"Ave Maria"	1997	13	24	35		Kerstmis met Jantje Smit / Weihnachten mit Jantje Smit
"Het land van mijn dromen"	1998	11	10	46		Het land van mijn dromen
"O sole mio"	1998	28	—	—		Het land van mijn dromen
"Eens zit het leven je weer mee"	1999	— (Note: "Eens zit het leven je weer mee" did not enter the Dutch Top 40, but peaked at number four on the Tipparade chart, which acts as an extension to the Top 40.)	62	—		Jantje Smit
"Puik idee ballade" (with Normaal)	1999	18	14	—		Jantje Smit
"Zing en lach en leef je uit"	2001	—	76	—		Zing en lach
"Op eigen benen"	2003	—	53	—		Op eigen benen
"Als de nacht verdwijnt (live)"	2004	—	48	—		jansmit.com
"Vrienden voor het leven" / "Als de nacht verdwijnt (live)"	2005	16	5	—		jansmit.com
"Boom Boom Bailando"	2005	23	9	24		jansmit.com
"Laura"	2005	7	1	9		jansmit.com
"Hoe kan ik van je dromen"	2006	24	4	— (Note: "Hoe kan ik van je dromen" did not enter the Ultratop 50, but peaked at number 10 on the Ultratip chart, which acts as an extension to the Ultratop 50.)		jansmit.com
"Als de morgen is gekomen"	2006	1	1	— (Note: "Als de morgen is gekomen" did not enter the Ultratop 50, but peaked at number 16 on the Ultratip chart, which acts as an extension to the Ultratop 50.)		Op weg naar geluk
"Cupido"	2006	1	1	36		Op weg naar geluk
"Op weg naar geluk"	2007	1	1	—		Op weg naar geluk
"Dan volg je haar benen" / "Calypso" (with John Denver)	2007	1	1	—		Stilte in de storm
"Stilte in de storm"	2008	2	1	—		Stilte in de storm
"Als je lacht"	2008	3	1	—		Stilte in de storm
"Je naam in de sterren"	2009	11	1	—		Stilte in de storm
"Leef nu het kan"	2010	5	1	—		Leef
"Terug in de tijd"	2010	34	2	—		Leef
"Zie wel hoe ik thuis kom"	2010	33	1	—		Leef
"Niemand zo trots als wij"	2011	19	1	28	NVPI: Platinum	15 jaar hits
"Hou je dan nog steeds van mij"	2011	34	1	44	NVPI: Gold	15 jaar hits
"Dromen"	2012	— (Note: "Dromen" did not enter the Dutch Top 40, but peaked at number two on the Tipparade chart, which acts as an extension to the Top 40.)	2	— (Note: "Dromen" did not enter the Ultratop 50, but peaked at number 75 on the Ultratip chart, which acts as an extension to the Ultratop 50.)		15 jaar hits
"Echte vrienden" (with Gerard Joling)	2012	10	1	—	NVPI: Gold	Vrienden
"Zingen lachen dansen" (with De Romeo's)	2012	—	—	23		Vrienden
"Altijd daar"	2012	28	1	—		Vrienden
"Sla je armen om me heen" (featuring Roos van Erkel)	2012	16	1	— (Note: "Sla je armen om me heen" did not enter the Ultratop 50, but peaked at number 77 on the Ultratip chart, which acts as an extension to the Ultratop 50.)	NVPI: Platinum	Vrienden
"Hoop, liefde en vertrouwen"	2013	— (Note: "Hoop, liefde en vertrouwen" did not enter the Dutch Top 40, but peaked at number two on the Tipparade chart, which acts as an extension to the Top 40.)	1	— (Note: "Hoop, liefde en vertrouwen" did not enter the Ultratop 50, but peaked at number 72 on the Ultratip chart, which acts as an extension to the Ultratop 50.)		Vrienden
"Leeg om je heen" / "To All the Girls I've Loved Before" (with Julio Iglesias)	2013	— (Note: "Leeg om je heen" / "To All the Girls I've Loved Before" did not enter the Dutch Top 40, but peaked at number one on the Tipparade chart, which acts as an extension to the Top 40.)	28	— (Note: "Leeg om je heen" / "To All the Girls I've Loved Before" did not enter the Ultratop 50, but peaked at number 77 on the Ultratip chart, which acts as an extension to the Ultratop 50.)		Vrienden
"Nederland wordt kampioen!" (with Johnny de Mol)	2014	— (Note: "Nederland wordt kamioen!" did not enter the Dutch Top 40, but peaked at number four on the Tipparade chart, which acts as an extension to the Top 40.)	1	—		Non-album single
"Jij & ik"	2014	22	1	— (Note: "Jij & ik" did not enter the Ultratop 50, but peaked at number 14 on the Ultratip chart, which acts as an extension to the Ultratop 50.)		Jij & ik
"Handen omhoog" (with Kraantje Pappie)	2014	26	1	— (Note: "Handen omhoog" did not enter the Ultratop 50, but peaked at number 44 on the Ultratip chart, which acts as an extension to the Ultratop 50.)	NVPI: Gold	Jij & ik
"Recht uit m'n hart"	2015	— (Note: "Recht uit m'n hart" did not enter the Dutch Top 40, but peaked at number two on the Tipparade chart, which acts as an extension to the Top 40.)	1	— (Note: "Recht uit m'n hart" did not enter the Ultratop 50, but peaked at number 39 on the Ultratip chart, which acts as an extension to the Ultratop 50.)	NPVI: Platinum	Recht uit m'n hart - Ballades
"Duizend en één nacht" (with Lindsay)	2015	—	—	— (Note: "Recht uit m'n hart" did not enter the Ultratop 50, but peaked at number 9 on the Ultratip chart, which acts as an extension to the Ultratop 50.)		Non-album single
"Kleine superster"	2015	— (Note: "Kleine superster" did not enter the Dutch Top 40, but peaked at number 11 on the Tipparade chart, which acts as an extension to the Top 40.)	3	—		Jij & ik
"Kom dichterbij me" (with Broederliefde)	2016	24	20	—		20
"—" denotes items which were not released in that country or failed to chart.

=== As featured artist ===
List of singles, with selected chart positions and certifications, showing year released
Title	Year	Peak chart positions			Certifications
Title	Year	NL Top 40	NL Top 100	BEL (FLA)	Certifications
"Mama" (BZN featuring Jantje Smit)	1996	12	12	—	
"Mi rowsu (Tuintje in mijn hart)" (Damaru featuring Jan Smit)	2009	1	1	— (Note: "Mi rowsu (Tuintje in mijn hart)" did not enter the Ultratop 50, but peaked at number 15 on the Ultratip chart, which acts as an extension to the Ultratop 50.)	NVPI: Platinum
"—" denotes items which were not released in that country or failed to chart.

=== Other appearances ===
List of singles, with selected chart positions, showing year released
Title	Year	Peak chart positions	
Title	Year	NL Top 40	NL Top 100
"Als je iets kan doen" (charity single by supergroep Artiesten voor Azië)	2005	1	1
"—" denotes items which were not released in that country or failed to chart.
