= Vladimir Nikolayevich Nikitin =

General in the Imperial Russian Army during the Russo-Turkish and Russo-Japanese war

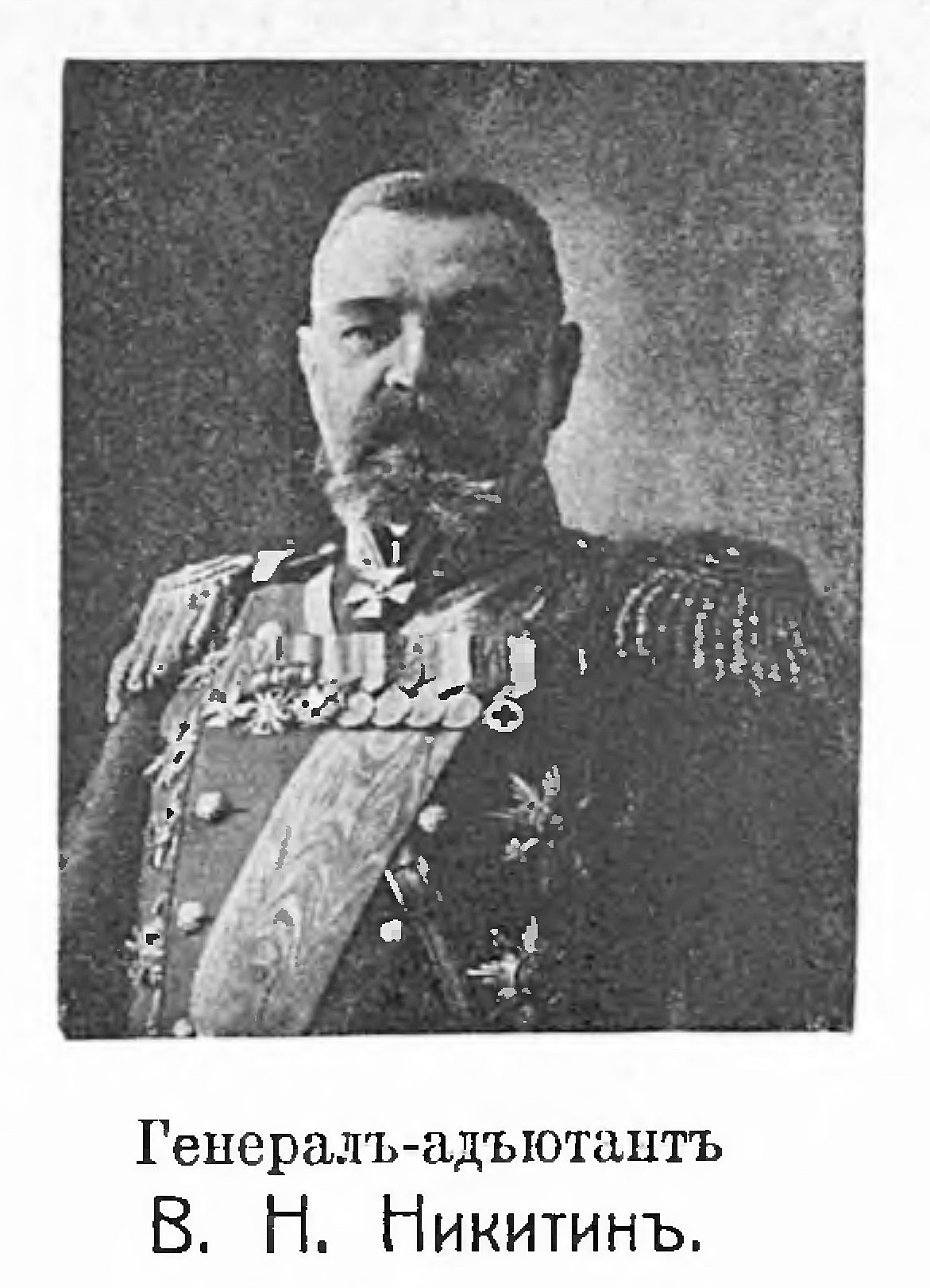
- Born: July 17, 1848
- Died: May 21, 1922 (aged 73)
- Allegiance: Russian Empire
- Branch: Imperial Russian Army
- Rank: General of the Artillery
- Commands: Artillery Brigade, 20th Infantry Division; 1st Army Corps; Irkutsk Military District; 7th Army
- Conflicts: Russo-Turkish War; Russo-Japanese War; Siege of Port Arthur; World War I

Vladimir Nikolayevich Nikitin (July 17, 1848 – May 21, 1922) was an Imperial Russian corps and army commander. He fought in the war against the Ottoman Empire and the Empire of Japan.

== Awards ==
Russo-Turkish War:

- Order of Saint George, 4th degree
- Order of Saint Vladimir, 4th class
- Order of Saint Anna, 4th class
- Order of Saint Stanislaus (House of Romanov), 2nd class
- Gold Sword for Bravery

Russo-Japanese War:

- Order of Saint George, 3rd degree
- Order of Saint Anna, 1st class
- Order of Saint Vladimir, 2nd class
- Order of the White Eagle (Russian Empire)

| Preceded by | Commander of the 20th Artillery Brigade; 1899–1904 | Succeeded by |
| Preceded by Anton von Saltza | Commander of the 1st Army Corps; 1908–1911 | Succeeded by Leonid Artamonov |
| Preceded by office created | Commander of the 7th Army; 1914–1915 | Succeeded by Dmitry Shcherbachev |

== Bibliography ==
- Залесский К. А. (2003). Кто был кто в Первой мировой войне (5000 экз ed.). Moscow: АСТ; Астрель. ISBN 5-17-019670-9 (ACT); ISBN 5-271-06895-1 (Астрель)
- "Минувшее. Исторический альманах". Никитин Владимир Николаевич. Vol. 17. М.—СПб. 1994. pp. 479, 536–539, 544, 567, 568.

== Sources ==
- Биография Никитина В. Н. на сайте «Хронос»
- "Vladimir Nikolayevich Nikitin" (in Russian). «Russian army in a Great war» project.
