= XX Corps =

20th Corps, Twentieth Corps, or XX Corps may refer to:

== Germany ==
- XX Corps (German Empire)
- XX Army Corps (Wehrmacht)

== United Kingdom ==
- XX Corps (United Kingdom)

=== Artillery Volunteer Corps ===
- 20th (Liverpool) Lancashire Artillery Volunteer Corps

=== Rifle Volunteer Corps ===
- 20th (Stockport) Cheshire Rifle Volunteer Corps
- 20th (Broadhembury) Devonshire Rifle Volunteer Corps
- 20th (Market Rasen) Lincolnshire Rifle Volunteer Corps
- 20th Middlesex Rifle Volunteer Corps (Railway Rifles)
- 20th (West Bromwich) Staffordshire Rifle Volunteer Corps
- 20th (Billingshurst) Sussex Rifle Volunteer Corps
- 20th (Doncaster, Great Northern Railway) Yorkshire West Riding Rifle Volunteer Corps

== United States ==
- XX Corps (United States)
- XX Corps (Union Army), American Civil War

== Other countries ==
- XX Army Corps (Italy)
- XX Corps (Ottoman Empire)
- 20th Army Corps (Russian Empire)
- 20th Mechanized Corps, Soviet Union
- 20th Army Corps (Ukraine)

== See also ==
- List of military corps by number
- 20th Army (disambiguation)
- 20th Brigade (disambiguation)
- 20th Division (disambiguation)
- 20th Regiment (disambiguation)
- 20th Squadron (disambiguation)
- 20th Battalion (disambiguation)
- 20th Group (disambiguation)
- 20th (disambiguation)
- XX (disambiguation)
