= 20th Division =

20th Division or 20th Infantry Division may refer to

== Infantry divisions ==
- 20th Division (1st Formation) (People's Republic of China)
- 20th Division (German Empire), 1866-1919
- 20th Landwehr Division, German Empire
- 20th Infantry Division (Wehrmacht), Germany, 1934–1945
- 20th Parachute Division, Germany
- 20th Waffen Grenadier Division of the SS (1st Estonian), 1944–1945
- 20th Infantry Division (Greece), 1941
- 20th Infantry Division (India), 1942–1945
- 20th Infantry Division "Friuli", Kingdom of Italy, 1939–1944
- 20th Division (Imperial Japanese Army), 1915–1945
- 20th Infantry Division (Poland), 1920–1939
- 20th Infantry Division (Russian Empire)
- 20th Guards Mechanized Division, Soviet Union
- 20th Guards Motor Rifle Division, Soviet Union and Russia, 1943-2009, 2021-
- 20th Guards Rifle Division, Soviet Union
- 20th Mechanized Division, Soviet Union
- 20th Rifle Division, Soviet Union
- 20th Division (Spain), 1937-1939
- 20th (Light) Division, United Kingdom, 1914–1919
- 20th Division (United States)
- 20th Division (Yugoslav Partisans)

== Armoured divisions ==
- 20th Panzer Division, Wehrmacht, Germany, 1940–1945
- 20th Armoured Division (Greece), formed 1956
- 20th Tank Division (Soviet Union)
- 20th Armored Division (United States), 1943–1946

== Aviation divisions ==
- 20th Air Division, United States, 1955–1960; 1966–1967; 1969–1983

== See also ==
- 20th Army (disambiguation)
- XX Corps (disambiguation)
- 20th Group (disambiguation)
- 20th Brigade (disambiguation)
- 20th Regiment (disambiguation)
- 20th Squadron (disambiguation)
