= 20th Battalion =

20th Battalion may refer to:

- 20th Battalion (Australia), a World War I ANZAC battalion
- 2/20th Battalion (Australia), a World War II Australian infantry battalion
- 20th (Central Ontario) Battalion, CEF, a World War I battalion for the Canadian Corps
- 20th Battalion, London Regiment (Blackheath and Woolwich)
- 20th Battalion (New Zealand), a World War II infantry battalion

== See also ==
- 20th Brigade (disambiguation)
- 20th Division (disambiguation)
- 20th Regiment (disambiguation)
- 20th Special Forces Group, a US Army National Guard group
- 20 Squadron (disambiguation)
- XX Corps (disambiguation)
