= 20th Reconnaissance Squadron =

20th Reconnaissance Squadron may refer to:

- The 410th Bombardment Squadron, constituted as the 20th Reconnaissance Squadron (Heavy) in January 1942, but redesignated as a bombardment unit before activation
- The 20th Special Operations Squadron, designated the 20th Reconnaissance Squadron (Fighter) from April 1943 to August 1943
- The 20th Tactical Reconnaissance Squadron, designated the 20th Reconnaissance Squadron, Long Range (Photographic-RCM) from May 1945 to June 1946 and the 20th Reconnaissance Squadron (Night Photographic) from July 1947 to June 1949
- The 20th Attack Squadron, designated the 20th Reconnaissance Squadron from January 2011 to May 2016

== See also ==
- The 20th Strategic Reconnaissance Squadronx
- The 20th Tactical Reconnaissance Squadron, active from August 1943 to November 1945
- The 20th Tactical Reconnaissance Squadron, active from March 1954 to November 1967
- 20 Squadron (disambiguation)
