= 20th Brigade =

20th Brigade may refer to:

== Australia ==
- 20th Brigade (Australia)

== India ==
- 20th Indian Brigade, a unit of the British Indian Army in World War I
- 20th Indian Infantry Brigade, a unit of the British Indian Army in World War II

== Russia/Soviet Union ==
- 20th Guards Motor Rifle Brigade
- 20th Guards Rocket Brigade

== South Korea ==
- 20th Armored Brigade (South Korea)

== Ukraine ==
- 20th Unmanned Systems Brigade

== United Kingdom ==
- 20th Light Armoured Brigade (United Kingdom)
- 20th Armoured Brigade (United Kingdom)
- 20th Brigade (United Kingdom)
- 20th Independent Infantry Brigade (Guards)
- 20th Mounted Brigade
- 20th Reserve Brigade

=== Artillery units ===
- 20th Brigade, Royal Field Artillery
- XX Brigade, Royal Horse Artillery (T.F.)

== United States ==
- 20th Aviation Brigade
- 20th Engineer Brigade (United States)

== See also ==
- 20th Army (disambiguation)
- 20th Battalion (disambiguation)
- XX Corps (disambiguation)
- 20th Division (disambiguation)
- 20th Regiment (disambiguation)
- 20 Squadron (disambiguation)
