= Twenty Lake =

Lake in the state of Minnesota, United States

- Location within Minnesota
- Location: Aitkin County, Minnesota
- Coordinates: 46°22′9″N 93°31′43″W
- Type: lake

Twenty Lake is a lake in Aitkin County, Minnesota, in the United States.

Twenty Lake was named from its location, in section 20.

== See also ==
- List of lakes in Minnesota
