= 20th Street =

20th Street may refer to:

- 20th Street (BMT Fifth Avenue Line), a defunct New York City Subway station
- Right Of Way/20th Street station, on the San Francisco Municipal Railway light rail network's J Church line
- 20th Street station (Muni Metro), a light rail stop on the Muni Metro T Third Street line in Dogpatch, San Francisco
- Twentieth Street Historic District, a California Registered Historic Place
