= Vrienden =

Studio album by Jan Smit
- Released: 10 August 2012
- Length: 39:43
- Label: Vosound Records

Jan Smit chronology
15 jaar hits (2011)	Vrienden (2012)

Singles from Vrienden
- 1. "Echte vrienden" Released: 24 May 2012; 2. "Zingen lachen dansen" Released: 23 July 2012; 3. "Altijd daar" Released: 1 September 2012; 4. "Sla je armen om me heen" Released: 19 October 2012; 5. "Hoop, liefde en vertrouwen" Released: 8 February 2013; 6. "Leeg om je heen" Released: 4 October 2012

Vrienden (English: "Friends") is a studio album by Dutch artist Jan Smit. It was released on 10 August 2012 through Vosound Records.

== Track listing ==
No.	Title	Length
1.	"Hoop, liefde en vertrouwen"	2:57
2.	"Echte vrienden"	3:10
3.	"Leeg om je heen"	3:15
4.	"Nieuwe vlinders"	3:01
5.	"Op het water"	2:57
6.	"Stap voor stap"	2:38
7.	"Tot m'n laatste lach"	3:18
8.	"Altijd daar"	3:05
9.	"Iedereen"	2:58
10.	"Sla je armen om me heen"	3:06
11.	"Net als toen"	3:06
12.	"Zomaar een cadeautje"	3:06
13.	"Zingen, lachen, dansen"	3:06
Total length:		39:43

== Charts and certifications ==
=== Weekly charts ===
Chart (2012)	Peak position
Belgian Albums (Ultratop Flanders)	1
Dutch Albums (Album Top 100)	1

=== Year-end charts ===
Chart (2012)	Position
Belgian Albums (Ultratop Flanders)	66
Dutch Albums (Album Top 100)	8
Chart (2013)	Position
Belgian Albums (Ultratop Flanders)	184

=== Certifications ===
Region	Certification	Certified units/sales
Netherlands (NVPI)	Gold	25,000^{^}
^{^} Shipments figures based on certification alone.
