= '20s =

'20s may refer to:

- 1820s
- 1920s
- 2020s

== See also ==
- 20s, a decade in the 1st century AD
- 20s BC, a decade in the 1st century BC
