= 20th Avenue =

20th Avenue or 20 Av may refer to:

- 20th Avenue (Brooklyn), a street in Brooklyn, New York
  - 20th Avenue (BMT Sea Beach Line), subway station serving the N and W trains
  - 20th Avenue (BMT West End Line), subway station serving the D train
- 20 Av, the twentieth day of Av, the fifth month of the Hebrew calendar
