= Twenty Lakes Basin =

Basin in the Sierra Nevada of California

Twenty Lakes Basin is located in California's eastern Sierra, east of Yosemite National Park, and includes Saddlebag Lake. It is the location of a hiking trail, with the trailhead at an elevation of 10,100 feet, and its base camps at Lee Vining and Mammoth Lakes.
