= 20th Lancers =

20th Lancers may refer to:

- 20th Lancers (British Indian Army), a regiment of the British Indian Army which saw service from 1921 to 1937 which later became the Indian Armoured Corps Training Centre and was allotted to India in 1947
- 20 Lancers (India), the successor regiment re-raised by the Indian Army in 1956
- 20th Lancers (Pakistan), a regiment re-raised by the Pakistan Army in 1956
