= Twentieth Amendment =

The Twentieth Amendment may refer to the:

- Twentieth Amendment to the United States Constitution (1933), established some details of presidential succession and of the beginning and ending of the terms of elected federal officials
- Twentieth Amendment of the Constitution of India (1966), relating to the appointment of judiciary
- Twentieth Amendment of the Constitution of Ireland (1999), provided constitutional recognition of local government
- Twentieth Amendment to the Constitution of Pakistan (2012)
- Twentieth Amendment to the Constitution of Sri Lanka (2020)
