= 20th Infantry Division (Russian Empire) =

- 20-я пехотная дивизия
- Active: 1914–1918
- Country: Russian Empire
- Branch: Russian Imperial Army
- Role: Infantry

The 20th Infantry Division (Russian: 20-я пехо́тная диви́зия, 20-ya Pekhotnaya Diviziya) was an infantry formation of the Russian Imperial Army.

== Organization ==
- 1st Brigade
  - 77th Infantry Regiment
  - 78th Infantry Regiment
- 2nd Brigade
  - 79th Infantry Regiment
  - 80th Infantry Regiment
- 20th Artillery Brigade

== Artillery Brigade Commanders ==
- 1899-1904: Vladimir Nikolayevich Nikitin
