= 20th Field Artillery Regiment, RCA =

- 20^{e} Régiment d'artillerie de campagne, ARC
- Badge of the Royal Regiment of Canadian Artillery
- Active: 1920 – present
- Country: Canada
- Branch: Canadian Army
- Type: Field artillery
- Size: HQ & Svcs Bty, 2 field batteries (61st Fd Bty & 78th Fd Bty)
- Part of: 41 Canadian Brigade Group
- Garrison/HQ: LCol Philip Debney Armoury (HQ & Svcs Bty and 61st Bty), Edmonton; LCol Eric Wyld Cormack Armoury (78th Bty), Red Deer; HMCS Tecumseh (D Tp, 78th Bty), Calgary
- Mottos: Quo fas et gloria ducunt (Latin for 'Whither right and glory lead')
- March: Slow march: "Royal Artillery Slow March"; Quick march (dismounted parades): "British Grenadiers"
- Anniversaries: Regimental Birthday: 2 February. St. Barbara's Day: 4 December.
- Equipment: C3 Howitzer
- Battle honours: Ubique (Latin for 'Everywhere')
- Website: www.canada.ca/en/army/corporate/3-canadian-division/20-field-artillery-regiment.html

Commanders
- Commanding officer: LCol Ian Haney, CD
- Regimental Sergeant Major: CWO Christopher Thombs, CD
- Honorary Colonel: HCol Blaine LaBonte
- Honorary Lieutenant Colonel: HLCol Karen Percy Lowe, CM

Insignia
- Abbreviation: 20 Fd Regt
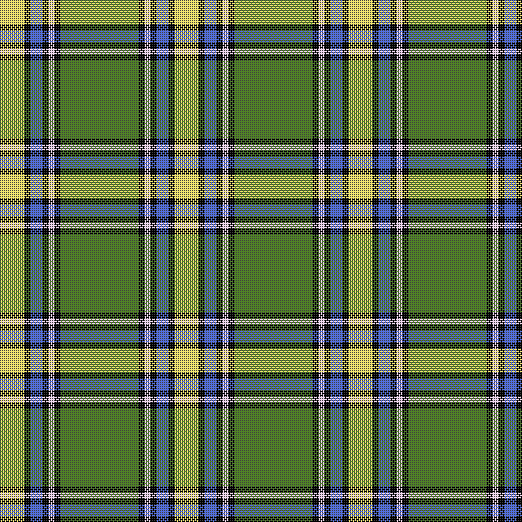
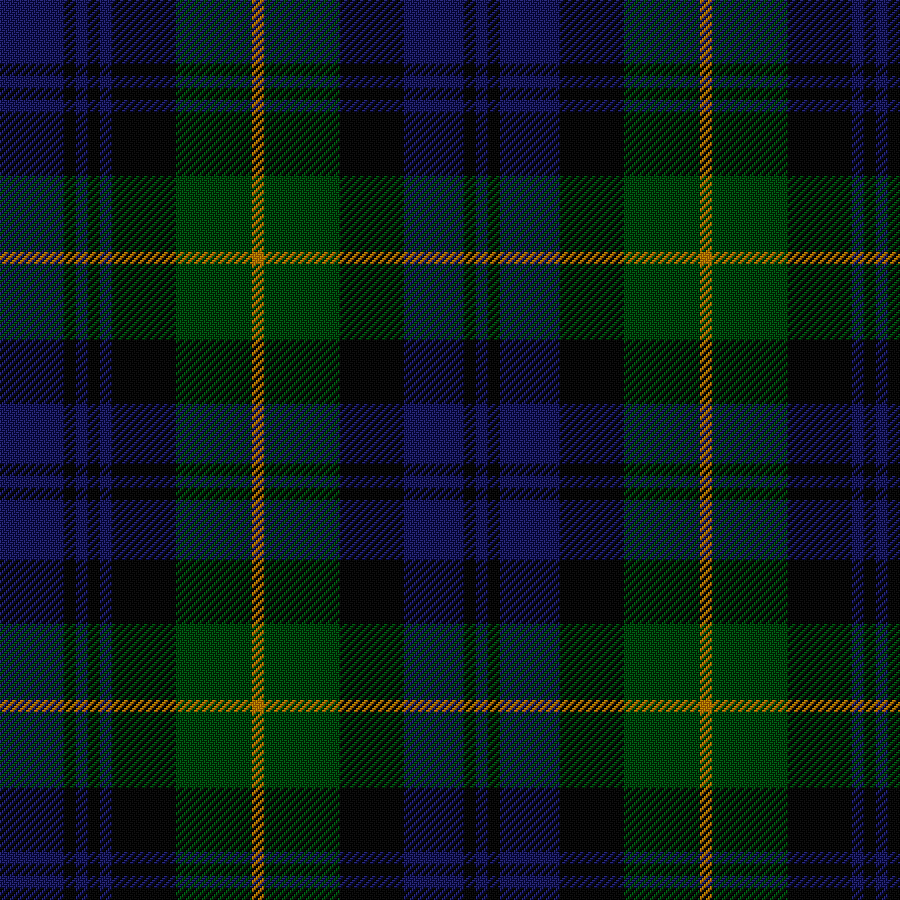
- Tartan: Alberta tartan (20 Fd Regt) Tartan of Alberta Gordon tartan (Royal Regiment of Canadian Artillery) This version of the tartan is the predominantly used Gordon pattern today. The tartan the same as that of the 92nd (Gordon Highlanders) Regiment tartan, in turn based on Black Watch.

The 20th Field Artillery Regiment, RCA (French: 20^{e} Régiment d'artillerie de campagne, ARC) is a Canadian Forces Primary Reserve artillery regiment of 41 Canadian Brigade Group. It is composed of the Headquarters and Services Battery and two field batteries, the 61st Field Battery, RCA, based in Edmonton and 78th Field Battery, RCA, based in Red Deer, Alberta. D Troop of 78th Field Battery parades at HMCS Tecumseh in Calgary.

== Allocated Batteries ==
- 61st Field Battery, RCA
- 78th Field Battery, RCA

== Lineage ==
- Originated on 2 February 1920, in Edmonton, Alberta as the 20th Brigade, CFA.
- Redesignated on 1 July 1925, as the 20th Field Brigade, CA.
- Redesignated on 3 June 1935, as the 20th Field Brigade, RCA.
- Redesignated on 7 November 1940, as the 20th (Reserve) Field Brigade, RCA.
- Redesignated on 1 March 1943, as the 20th (Reserve) Field Regiment, RCA.
- Redesignated on 1 April 1946, as the 20th Heavy Anti-Aircraft Regiment, RCA.
- Redesignated on 21 September 1954, as the 96th Independent Medium Battery, RCA.
- Redesignated on 12 April 1960, as the 96th Independent Medium Artillery Battery, RCA.
- Redesignated on 17 October 1961, as the 20th Medium Artillery Regiment, RCA.
- Redesignated on 4 December 1964, as the 20th Field Artillery Regiment, RCA.

== Regimental Affiliations ==
The regiment supports three Royal Canadian Army Cadets corps: 180 Royal Canadian Army Cadet Corps in Edmonton, 1390 Royal Canadian Army Cadet Corps in Red Deer, and 2561 Royal Canadian Army Cadet Corps in Calmar, Alberta. The regiment is affiliated with 105th Regiment Royal Artillery (The Scottish and Ulster Gunners). 20 Fd Regt also maintains a regimental association for serving members and alumni.

== Order of precedence ==
Preceded by 15th Field Artillery Regiment, RCA	20th Field Artillery Regiment, RCA	Succeeded by 26th Field Artillery Regiment, RCA of Royal Canadian Artillery

== See also ==
- Military history of Canada
- History of the Canadian Army
- Canadian Forces
- List of armouries in Canada
