= Twenty dollar bill =

A twenty dollar bill or twenty dollar note is a banknote denominated with a value of twenty dollars and represents a form of currency.

Examples of twenty-dollar bills include:

- Australian twenty-dollar note
- Canadian twenty-dollar bill
- Hong Kong twenty-dollar note
- New Zealand twenty dollar note
- United States twenty-dollar bill
