= 20 Squadron =

20 Squadron or 20th Squadron may refer to:

- No. 20 Squadron RAAF, a unit of the Royal Australian Air Force
- No. 20 Squadron RAF, a unit of the United Kingdom Royal Air Force
- No. 20 Squadron RAF Regiment, a unit of the United Kingdom Royal Air Force
- 20 Squadron (Portugal), see list of Portuguese Air Force aircraft squadrons
- 20th Aero Squadron, a unit of the United States Army Air Service
- 20th Airlift Squadron, a unit of the United States Air Force
- 20th Attack Squadron, a unit of the United States Air Force
- 20th Bomb Squadron, a unit of the United States Air Force
- 20th Fighter Squadron, a unit of the United States Air Force
- 20th Frigate Squadron, a unit of the United Kingdom Royal Navy
- 20th Intelligence Squadron, a unit of the United States Air Force
- 20th Reconnaissance Squadron (disambiguation), units of the United States Air Force
- 20th Special Operations Squadron, a unit of the United States Air Force
- 20th Space Surveillance Squadron, a unit of the United States Space Force
- 20th Troop Carrier Squadron, a unit of the United States Army Air Forces
- 20th Operational Weather Squadron, a unit of the United States Air Force
- Submarine Squadron 20, a unit of the United States Navy
- VF-20 (Fighter Squadron 20), a unit of the United States Navy
- VP-20 (Patrol Squadron 20), a unit of the United States Navy
