= 20th Regiment =

20th Regiment may refer to:

== Infantry regiments ==
- 20th Infantry Regiment (United States)
- 20th Regiment of Bengal Native Infantry, an East India Company unit
- 20th Duke of Cambridge's Own Infantry (Brownlow's Punjabis), a British Indian Army unit
- 20th Continental Regiment, a Continental Army unit
- 20th Regiment of Foot, a British Army unit

=== American Civil War regiments ===
==== Union (Northern) regiment ====
- 20th Connecticut Infantry Regiment
- 20th Illinois Infantry Regiment
- 20th Indiana Infantry Regiment
- 20th Iowa Infantry Regiment
- 20th Kansas Militia Infantry Regiment
- 20th Kentucky Infantry Regiment
- 20th Maine Infantry Regiment
- 20th Massachusetts Infantry Regiment
- 20th Michigan Infantry Regiment
- 20th New York Infantry Regiment
- 20th Pennsylvania Infantry Regiment
- 20th Wisconsin Infantry Regiment

==== Confederate (Southern) regiments ====
- 20th Arkansas Infantry Regiment
- 20th Tennessee Infantry Regiment
- 20th Virginia Infantry Regiment

== Other regiments ==
- 20th Marine Regiment (United States)
- 20th Field Artillery Regiment, RCA, Royal Canadian Artillery
- 20th Field Artillery Regiment (United States)
- 20th Hussars, a cavalry regiment of the British Army
- 20th Lancers (Pakistan), an armoured regiment
- 20th Light Dragoons, a cavalry regiment of the British Army
- 20th Surveillance and Target Acquisition Regiment, Royal Australian Artillery
