= List of regiments of foot =

British Army infantry regiments (1700s–1881)

This is a list of numbered regiments of foot of the British Army from the mid-18th century until 1881, when numbering was abandoned. Foot was the contemporary term for infantry.

== Introduction ==
=== Rank and numbering ===
==== Establishment of precedence ====
The rank of regiments of the English Army was first fixed during the Nine Years' War. Doubts as to the respective rank of regiments fighting in the Spanish Netherlands led William III of England to command a Board of General Officers meeting on 10 June 1694 to establish the order of precedence of the various units.

With the union of the kingdoms of England and Scotland to form the Kingdom of Great Britain in 1707 the British Army came into existence (see Creation of British Army). The order of seniority for the most senior line regiments in the British Army is based on the order of seniority in the English army. Scottish and Irish regiments were only allowed to take a rank in the English army from the date of their arrival in England or the date when they were first placed on the English establishment.

The rank or precedence of regiments was fixed by the following criteria:

- English regiments, raised in England, should rank from their date of raising
- English, Scots and Irish regiments, raised for service of a foreign power, should rank from the date that they came onto the English establishment

This led to anomalies, such as the Royal Irish Regiment, raised in 1684, being ranked as the 18th of the line, junior to eleven regiments raised between 1685 and 1688. Similarly, the Coldstream Guards is the oldest continuously serving regular regiment in the British Army. However, this regiment was placed as the second senior regiment as it entered the service of the Crown after the 1st Regiment of Foot Guards. (The Coldstream answered by adopting the motto Nulli Secundus—Second to None.)

==== Numbering ====
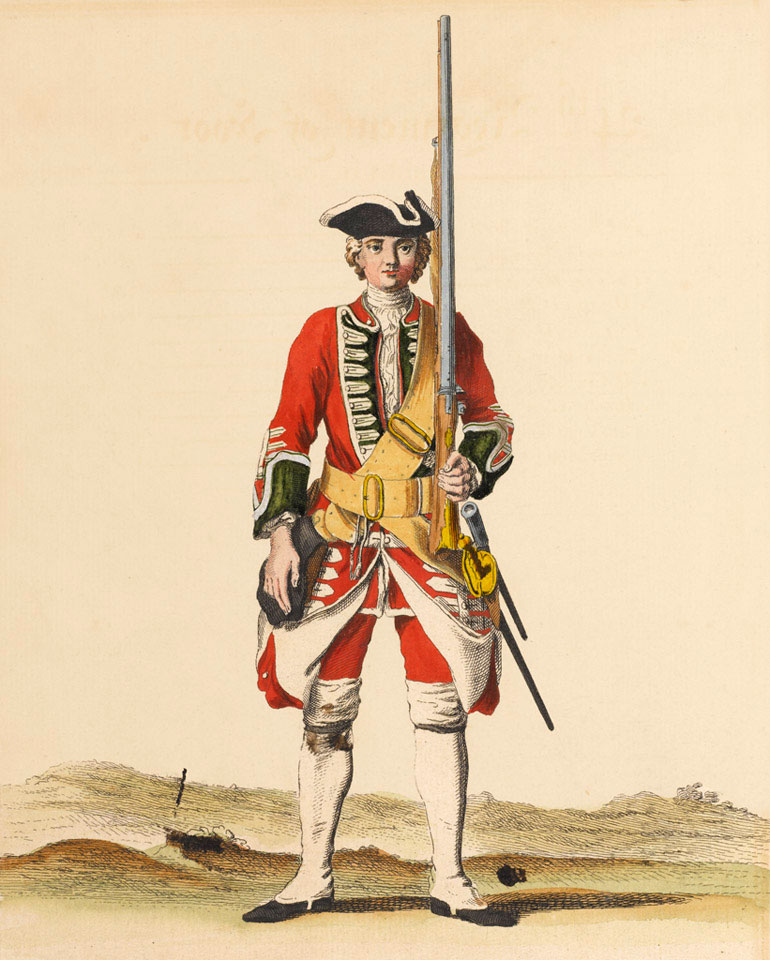
Engraving of a 24th Foot private from the Cloathing Book, which only referred to regiments by their numbers

While regiments were known by the name of their colonel, or by their royal title, the number of their rank was increasingly used. Thus, in the Cloathing Book (c. 1742), which illustrated the patterns of uniforms worn by the British army, the regiments of foot are designated simply by numbers.

The substitution of numbers for names was completed by a clothing regulation of 1747 and a royal warrant of 1751. The 1747 document, which used numbers for the regiments throughout, decreed that no colonel was "to put his Arms, Crest, Device or Livery on any part of the Appointments of the Regiment under his command." Furthermore, in the centre of the regiment's colours was to be "painted or embroidered in gold Roman characters the number of the Rank of the Regiment". The warrant, dated 1 July 1751, repeated the instructions of the 1747 regulation and provided that regiments should in future be known by their numbers only.

As the size of the army expanded and contracted during the various conflicts of the 18th and 19th centuries, junior regiments were raised and disbanded. Accordingly, there were often a number of different regiments that bore the same number at different periods. Additionally, there were occasional partial renumberings. For instance, in 1816 the 95th (Rifle) Regiment of Foot was renamed the "Rifle Brigade", without a number. The existing 96th–103rd regiments were redesignated as the 95th–102nd.

==== Childers reforms ====
With modifications the numbers existed until 1881, when the Childers Reforms introduced "territorialisation". From 1 July 1881 the United Kingdom was divided into regimental districts, each allocated a two-battalion regiment, usually bearing a "county" title. Regimental numbers were abandoned: the 1st to 25th foot, which already had two battalions adopted new titles. The remaining regiments were paired to become the 1st or 2nd battalions of the new regiments. Two rifle regiments: the King's Royal Rifle Corps (ex 60th Foot) and the Rifle Brigade, who had four battalions each, recruited nationally.

Although the numbers were officially abolished in 1881, in some cases they continued to be used informally within the regiments. The regimental system introduced in 1881 was to last for more than seventy years. When new regiments were formed by amalgamation from 1958 onwards, the old regimental numbers were sometimes reintroduced into their titles. Examples are the 3rd East Anglian Regiment (16th/44th Foot), Worcestershire and Sherwood Foresters Regiment (29th/45th Foot).

=== Royal and subsidiary titles ===
The 1751 warrant confirmed the royal titles or other special designations of the 1st, 2nd, 3rd, 4th, 7th, 8th, 18th, 21st, 23rd, 27th and 41st regiments. In later years, other regiments were allowed to bear the names of the monarch or other members of the Royal family. Only one regiment, the 33rd Foot, was allowed to bear the name of a person other than Royalty when it became the "Duke of Wellington's" in 1853, the year after the death of the First Duke, who had served as a subaltern in the regiment.

==== County affiliations ====
On 21 August 1782, the Commander-in-Chief of the Forces, Henry Seymour Conway, issued a regulation giving an English county designation to each regiment of foot other than those with a royal title or highland regiments. The intention was to improve recruitment during the unpopular American War of Independence, and the Home Secretary, Thomas Townshend issued a circular letter to the lieutenants of each county in England in the following terms:

My Lord,
The very great deficiency of men in the regiments of infantry being so very detrimental to the public service, the king has thought proper to give the names of the different counties to the old corps, in hopes that, by the zeal and activity of the principal nobility and gentry in the several counties, some considerable assistance may be given towards recruiting these regiments".

The names of the counties were added to the regimental titles in parentheses, ranging from the 3rd (Buffs – East Kent) Regiment of Foot to the 70th (Surrey) Regiment of Foot. In some cases more than one regiment was allocated to a county, for example, the 38th (1st Staffordshire) Regiment of Foot and 64th (2nd Staffordshire) Regiment of Foot. The attempt to link regimental areas to specific counties was found to be impractical, with regiments preferring to recruit from major centres of population. By June 1783 each regiment was again recruiting throughout the country, although the county names were to remain. In a few cases, affiliations were altered: for example the 14th and 16th Foot "exchanged" counties in 1809.

==== Fusiliers, light infantry and rifles ====
- Fusiliers: The 7th, 21st and 23rd foot had borne the title of fusiliers for some time before 1751. These regiments had originally been armed with flintlocks (or fusils, from the French), rather than matchlocks. Later, the "fusilier" title was granted as a purely honorary distinction to the 87th Foot in 1827 and to the 5th Foot in 1836. The 101st to 104th Fusiliers joined the British Army from the Honourable East India Company (HEIC) in 1861.
- Light infantry: During the Napoleonic Wars it was decided to convert a number of line regiments to light infantry, and in 1803 the 43rd and 52nd foot were accordingly redesignated as the 43rd (Monmouthshire Light Infantry) Regiment of Foot and 52nd (Oxfordshire Light Infantry) Regiment of Foot. In the next few years the 13th, 51st, 68th, 85th and 90th foot were converted to light infantry. By the middle of the 19th century, the title of "light infantry" was largely an honorary one, reflected by the "elevation" of the 32nd Foot to light infantry in 1858 to recognise their gallantry in the Siege of Lucknow. Two more light infantry regiments subsequently joined the British Army, as the 105th and 106th regiments, transferred from the HEIC in 1861.
- Rifle regiments: An experimental corps of riflemen, equipped with Baker rifles and clothed in rifle green uniforms, was formed in 1800, and numbered as the 95th foot in 1802. The 60th Foot, which had some rifle battalions, was converted to rifles in 1824.

== List of regiments of foot ==
=== 1st–10th foot ===
Number	Titles	Date of raising or coming onto establishment	Fate	Successor 2023
1	1st (Royal) Regiment of Foot 1751–1812 1st Regiment of Foot (Royal Scots) 1812–1821; 1st or the Royal Regiment of Foot 1821–1871; 1st or the Royal Scots Regiment 1871–1881	1661; Raised 28 March 1633, in Scotland for French service. Was on English establishment in 1661 and in 1666–67; permanently from 1678.	1881: Lothian Regiment (Royal Scots)	Royal Regiment of Scotland
2	2nd (Queen's Royal) Regiment of Foot	1661; Raised 1 October 1661, as the Tangier Regiment	1881: The Queen's (Royal West Surrey Regiment)	Princess of Wales's Royal Regiment
3	3rd (or the Buffs) Regiment of Foot 1751–1782 3rd (East Kent – the Buffs) Regiment of Foot 1782–1881	1665; Raised 1572 for service in Holland. Came onto the English establishment in 1665 as the Holland Regiment.	1881: The Buffs (East Kent Regiment)	Princess of Wales's Royal Regiment
4	4th (The King's Own) Regiment of Foot 1751–1867 4th (The King's Own Royal) Regiment of Foot 1867–1881	1680; Raised 13 July 1680, as the 2nd Tangier Regiment.	1881: The King's Own Royal Regiment (Lancaster)	Duke of Lancaster's Regiment
5	5th Regiment of Foot 1751–1782 5th (Northumberland) Regiment of Foot 1782–1836; 5th (Northumberland) (Fusiliers) Regiment of Foot 1836–1881	1685; Raised 8 August 1674, as the Irish Regiment for Dutch service. Came onto the English establishment in 1685.	1881: The Northumberland Fusiliers	Royal Regiment of Fusiliers
6	6th Regiment of Foot 1751–1782 6th (1st Warwickshire) Regiment of Foot 1782–1832; 6th (Royal 1st Warwickshire) Regiment of Foot 1832–1881	1685; Raised 12 December 1673, in Ireland for Dutch service. Came onto the English establishment temporarily in 1685 and permanently in 1688.	1881: The Royal Warwickshire Regiment	Royal Regiment of Fusiliers
7	7th (Royal Fusiliers) Regiment of Foot 1751–1881	1685; Raised 11 June 1685, as the Ordnance Regiment, an escort to the artillery train. Became the Royal Regiment of Fuzileers in 1689.	1881: The Royal Fusiliers (City of London Regiment)	Royal Regiment of Fusiliers
8	8th (The King's) Regiment of Foot 1751–1881	1685; Raised 19 June 1685, as Princess Anne of Denmark's Regiment of Foot.	1881: The King's (Liverpool Regiment)	Duke of Lancaster's Regiment
9	9th Regiment of Foot 1751–1782 9th (East Norfolk) Regiment of Foot 1782–1881	1685; Raised 19 June 1685, as Henry Cornewall's Regiment of Foot.	1881: The Norfolk Regiment	Royal Anglian Regiment
10	10th Regiment of Foot 1751–1782 10th (North Lincolnshire) Regiment of Foot 1782–1881	1685; Raised 20 June 1685, as the Earl of Bath's Regiment of Foot.	1881: The Lincolnshire Regiment	Royal Anglian Regiment

=== 11th–20th foot ===
Number	Titles	Date of raising or coming onto establishment	Fate	Successor 2012
11	11th Regiment of Foot 1751–1782 11th (North Devonshire) Regiment of Foot 1782–1881	1685; Raised 20 June 1685 as the Duke of Beaufort's Musketeers.	1881: The Devonshire Regiment	The Rifles
12	12th Regiment of Foot 1751–1782 12th (East Suffolk) Regiment of Foot 1782–1881	1685; Raised 20 June 1685 as the Duke of Norfolk's Regiment of Foot.	1881: The Suffolk Regiment	Royal Anglian Regiment
13	13th Regiment of Foot 1751–1782 13th (1st Somersetshire) Regiment of Foot 1782–1822; 13th (1st Somersetshire Light Infantry) Regiment of Foot 1822–1842; 13th (1st Somersetshire) (Prince Albert's Light Infantry) Regiment of Foot 1842–1881	1685; Raised 20 June 1685 as the Earl of Huntingdon's Regiment of Foot.	1881: Prince Albert's Light Infantry (Somersetshire Regiment)	The Rifles
14	14th Regiment of Foot 1751–1782 14th (Bedfordshire) Regiment of Foot 1782–1809; 14th (Buckinghamshire) Regiment of Foot 1809–1876; 14th (Buckinghamshire – The Prince of Wales's Own) Regiment of Foot 1876–1881	1685; Raised 22 June 1685 as Sir Edward Hales's Regiment of Foot.	1881: The Prince of Wales's Own (West Yorkshire Regiment)	Royal Yorkshire Regiment
15	15th Regiment of Foot 1751–1782 15th (Yorkshire, East Riding) Regiment of Foot 1782–1881	1685; Raised 22 June 1685 as Sir William Clifton's Regiment of Foot.	1881: The East Yorkshire Regiment	Royal Yorkshire Regiment
16	16th Regiment of Foot 1751–1782 16th (Buckinghamshire) Regiment of Foot 1782–1809; 16th (Bedfordshire) Regiment of Foot 1809–1881	1688; Raised 10 September 1688 as Archibald Douglas's Regiment of Foot.	1881: The Bedfordshire Regiment	Royal Anglian Regiment
17	17th Regiment of Foot 1751–1782 17th (Leicestershire) Regiment of Foot 1782–1881	1688; Raised 27 September 1688 as Solomon Richard's Regiment of Foot.	1881: The Leicestershire Regiment	Royal Anglian Regiment
18	18th (The Royal Irish) Regiment of Foot 1751–1881	1688; Raised in Ireland on 1 April 1684 as the Earl of Granard's Regiment of Foot. Placed on the English establishment in 1688.	1881: The Royal Irish Regiment (disbanded 1922)	
19	19th Regiment of Foot 1751–1782 19th (1st Yorkshire, North Riding) Regiment of Foot 1782–1875; 19th (1st Yorkshire, North Riding – Princess of Wales's Own) Regiment of Foot 1875–1881	1688; Raised 20 November 1688 as Francis Lutterell's Regiment of Foot.	1881: The Princess of Wales's Own (Yorkshire Regiment)	Royal Yorkshire Regiment
20	20th Regiment of Foot 1751–1782 20th (East Devonshire) Regiment of Foot 1782–1881	1688; Raised 20 November 1688 as Sir Richard Peyton's Regiment of Foot.	1881: The Lancashire Fusiliers	Royal Regiment of Fusiliers

=== 21st–30th foot ===
Number	Titles	Date of raising or coming onto establishment	Fate	Successor 2012
21	21st (Royal North British Fusiliers) Regiment of Foot 1751–1877 21st (Royal Scots Fusiliers) Regiment of Foot 1877–1881	1688; Raised 23 September 1678 as the Earl of Mar's Regiment. Placed on English establishment in 1688.	1881: The Royal Scots Fusiliers	Royal Regiment of Scotland
22	22nd Regiment of Foot 1751–1782 22nd (Cheshire) Regiment of Foot 1782–1881	1689; Raised 8 March 1689 as the Duke of Norfolk's Regiment of Foot.	1881: The Cheshire Regiment	Mercian Regiment
23	23rd (Royal Welch Fusiliers) Regiment of Foot 1751–1881	1689; Raised 16 March 1689 as Lord Herbert's Regiment of Foot.	1881: Royal Welsh Fusiliers	Royal Welsh
24	24th Regiment of Foot 1751–1782 24th (2nd Warwickshire) Regiment of Foot 1782–1881	1689; Raised 8 March 1689 as Sir Edward Dering's Regiment of Foot.	1881: The South Wales Borderers	Royal Welsh
25	25th Regiment of Foot 1751–1782 25th (Sussex) Regiment of Foot 1782–1805; 25th (King's Own Borderers) Regiment of Foot 1805–1881	1689; Raised 19 March 1689 as The Earl of Leven's or Edinburgh, Regiment of Foot.	1881: The King's Own Borderers	Royal Regiment of Scotland
26	26th Regiment of Foot 1751–1786 26th (Cameronian) Regiment of Foot 1809–1881	1689; Raised 14 May 1689 as The Earl of Angus's Regiment of Foot.	1881: 1st Battalion, The Cameronians (Scottish Rifles) (disbanded 1968)	
27	27th (Inniskilling) Regiment of Foot 1751–1881	1689; Raised 26 June 1689 as Zacharaiah Tiffin's Regiment of Foot.	1881: 1st Battalion, The Royal Inniskilling Fusiliers	Royal Irish Regiment
28	28th Regiment of Foot 1751–1782; 28th (North Gloucestershire) Regiment of Foot 1782–1881	1694; Raised as Sir John Gibson's Regiment of Foot 16 February 1694, disbanded 1697. Reraised 12 February 1702	1881: 1st Battalion, The Gloucestershire Regiment	The Rifles
29	29th Regiment of Foot 1751–1782 29th (Worcestershire) Regiment of Foot 1782–1881	1694; Raised as Thomas Farrington's Regiment of Foot 16 February 1694, disbanded 1698. Reraised 12 February 1702	1881: 1st Battalion, The Worcestershire Regiment	Mercian Regiment
30	30th Regiment of Foot 1751–1782 30th (Cambridgeshire) Regiment of Foot 1782–1881	1689; Raised 8 March 1689 as Viscount Castleton's Regiment of Foot, later (1694) Thomas Saunderson's Regiment of Foot. Disbanded 1698. Reraised 12 February 1702 as Thomas Saunderson's Regiment of Marines	1881: 1st Battalion, The East Lancashire Regiment	Duke of Lancaster's Regiment

=== 31st–40th foot ===
Number	Titles	Date of raising or coming onto establishment	Fate	Successor 2012
31	31st Regiment of Foot 1751–1782 31st (Huntingdonshire) Regiment of Foot 1782–1881	1696 Reraised 14 April 1702 as George Villiers's Regiment of Marines. Converted to line infantry in 1714.	1881: 1st Battalion, The East Surrey Regiment	Princess of Wales's Royal Regiment
32	32nd Regiment of Foot 1751–1782 32nd (Cornwall) Regiment of Foot 1782–1858; 32nd (Cornwall) Light Infantry 1858–1881	1702; Raised 12 February 1702 as Edward Fox's Regiment of Marines. Converted to line infantry in 1715.	1881: 1st Battalion, The Duke of Cornwall's Light Infantry	The Rifles
33	33rd Regiment of Foot 1751–1782 33rd (1st Yorkshire, West Riding) Regiment of Foot 1782–1853; 33rd (The Duke of Wellington's) Regiment of Foot 1853–1881	1702; Raised 12 February 1702 as The Earl of Huntingdon's Regiment of Foot.	1881: 1st Battalion, The Duke of Wellington's (West Riding Regiment)	Royal Yorkshire Regiment
34	34th Regiment of Foot 1751–1782 34th (Cumberland) Regiment of Foot 1782–1881	1702; Raised 12 February 1702 as Lord Lucas's Regiment of Foot.	1881: 1st Battalion, The Border Regiment	Duke of Lancaster's Regiment
35	35th Regiment of Foot 1751–1782 35th (Dorsetshire) Regiment of Foot 1782–1805; 35th (Sussex) Regiment of Foot 1805–1832; 35th (Royal Sussex) Regiment of Foot 1832–1881	1702; Raised 28 June 1701 on the Irish Establishment as The Earl of Donegall's Regiment of Foot, on English Establishment in following year.	1881: 1st Battalion, The Royal Sussex Regiment	Princess of Wales's Royal Regiment
36	36th Regiment of Foot 1751–1782 36th (Herefordshire) Regiment of Foot 1782–1881	1702; Raised 10 May 1701 on the Irish Establishment as Viscount Charlemont's Regiment of Foot, on English Establishment in following year.	1881: 2nd Battalion, The Worcestershire Regiment	Mercian Regiment
37	37th Regiment of Foot 1751–1782 37th (North Hampshire) Regiment of Foot 1782–1881	1702; Raised 13 February 1702 as Thomas Meredyth's Regiment of Foot.	1881: 1st Battalion, The Hampshire Regiment	Princess of Wales's Royal Regiment
38	38th Regiment of Foot 1751–1782; 38th (1st Staffordshire) Regiment of Foot 1782–1881	1702; Raised 13 February 1702 as Luke Lillingston's Regiment of Foot	1881: 1st Battalion, The South Staffordshire Regiment	Mercian Regiment
39	39th Regiment of Foot 1751–1782 39th (East Middlesex) Regiment of Foot 1782–1807; 39th (Dorsetshire) Regiment of Foot 1807–1881	1702; Raised 29 February 1702 as Richard Coote's Regiment of Foot	1881: 1st Battalion, The Dorsetshire Regiment	The Rifles
40	40th Regiment of Foot 1751–1782 40th (2nd Somersetshire) Regiment of Foot 1782–1881	1717; Raised 25 August 1717 as Richard Philipps's Regiment of Foot	1881: 1st Battalion, The Prince of Wales's Volunteers (South Lancashire Regiment)	Duke of Lancaster's Regiment

=== 41st–50th foot ===
Number	Titles	Date of raising or coming onto establishment	Fate	Successor 2012
41	41st Regiment of Foot or Invalids 1751–1787 41st Regiment of Foot 1787–1831; 41st (The Welsh) Regiment of Foot 1831–1881	1719 Formed 11 March 1719 as Edmund Fielding's Regiment of Foot from companies of outpatients or "invalids" from Chelsea Hospital. Also known as the "1st Invalids" or "Regiment of Invalids".	1881: 1st Battalion, The Welsh Regiment	Royal Welsh
42	Oglethorpe's Regiment (42nd)	1737; James Oglethorpe's Regiment of Foot was formed 25 August 1737 in Gibraltar. Ranked as 42nd Foot in 1747, disbanded 29 May 1749 in Georgia.		
42	42nd Regiment of Foot 1751–1758 42nd (The Royal Highland) Regiment of Foot 1758–1861; 42nd (The Royal Highland) Regiment of Foot (The Black Watch) 1861–1881	1739 Six Independent Highland Companies raised 24 April 1725. The Earl of Craufurd's Regiment was formed 25 October 1739 by the regimentation of the independent companies. Ranked as 43rd Foot in 1747, renumbered to 42nd in 1749 on disbanding of existing 42nd Regiment. Known as the "Highland Regiment".	1881: 1st Battalion, The Black Watch (Royal Highlanders)	Royal Regiment of Scotland
43	Alexander Spotswood's Regiment (43rd), later Gooch's American Regiment	1739; Raised by Alexander Spotswood in North America: on Spotswood's death in April 1740 William Gooch became colonel. After War of Jenkins' Ear was disbanded in 1742.		
43	The Highland Regiment (43rd): renumbered to 42nd in 1749: see above			
43	43rd Regiment of Foot 1751–1782 43rd (Monmouthshire) Regiment of Foot 1782–1803; 43rd (Monmouthshire Light Infantry) Regiment of Foot	1741; Raised 1 March 1741 as Thomas Fowke's Regiment of Foot, ranked as 54th foot in 1747. Renumbered as 43rd in 1748/49 on disbandment of a number of regiments.	1881: 1st Battalion, The Oxfordshire Light Infantry	The Rifles
44	44th Regiment of Foot (1st Marines)1739–1748	1739; Raised 17 November 1739 as Edward Wolfe's Regiment of Marines, ranked as 44th Foot or 1st Marines by 1741. Disbanded 11 November 1748.		
44	44th Regiment of Foot 1751–1782 44th (East Essex) Regiment of Foot 1782–1881	1741; Raised 7 January 1741 as James Long's Regiment of Foot. Ranked 55th, renumbered 44th in 1748 on disbandment of ten regiments of marines.	1881: 1st Battalion, The Essex Regiment	Royal Anglian Regiment
45	45th Regiment of Foot (2nd Marines)1739–1748	1739; Raised 18 November 1739 as William Robinson's Regiment of Marines, ranked as 45th Foot or 2nd Marines by 1741. Disbanded 9 November 1748.		
45	45th Regiment of Foot 1751–1782 45th (1st Nottinghamshire) Regiment of Foot 1782–1866; 45th (Nottinghamshire Sherwood Foresters) Regiment of Foot 1866–1881	1741; Raised 11 January 1741 as Daniel Houghton's Regiment of Foot. Ranked 56th, renumbered 45th in 1748 on disbandment of ten regiments of marines.	1881: 1st Battalion, The Sherwood Foresters (Derbyshire Regiment)	Mercian Regiment
46	46th Regiment of Foot (3rd Marines)1739–1748	1739; Raised 19 November 1739 as Anthony Lowther's Regiment of Marines, ranked as 46th Foot or 3rd Marines by 1741. Disbanded 7 November 1748.		
46	46th Regiment of Foot 1751–1782 46th (South Devonshire) Regiment of Foot 1782–1881	1741; Raised 13 January 1741 as John Price's Regiment of Foot. Ranked 57th, renumbered 46th in 1748 on disbandment of ten regiments of marines.	1881: 2nd Battalion, The Duke of Cornwall's Light Infantry	The Rifles
47	47th Regiment of Foot (4th Marines)1739–1748	1739; Raised 20 November 1739 as John Wynyard's Regiment of Marines, ranked as 47th Foot or 4th Marines by 1741. Disbanded 8 November 1748.		
47	47th Regiment of Foot 1751–1782 47th (Lancashire) Regiment of Foot 1782–1881	1741; Raised 15 January 1741 as Sir John Mordaunt's Regiment of Foot. Ranked 58th, renumbered 47th in 1748 on disbandment of ten regiments of marines.	1881: 1st Battalion, The Loyal North Lancashire Regiment	Duke of Lancaster's Regiment
48	48th Regiment of Foot (5th Marines)1739–1748	1739; Raised 20 November 1739 as Charles Douglass's Regiment of Marines, from 1740 Jame's Cochrane's Regiment: ranked as 48th Foot or 5th Marines by 1741. Disbanded 4 November 1748.		
48	48th Regiment of Foot 1751–1782 48th (Northamptonshire) Regiment of Foot 1782–1881	1741; Raised 31 January 1741 as James Cholmondeley's Regiment of Foot. Ranked 59th, renumbered 48th in 1748 on disbandment of ten regiments of marines.	1881: 1st Battalion, The Northamptonshire Regiment	Royal Anglian Regiment
49	49th Regiment of Foot (6th Marines)1739–1748	1739; Raised 20 November 1739 as Lewis Moreton's Regiment of Marines, later known as Cotterell's Regiment: ranked as 49th Foot or 6th Marines by 1741. Disbanded 4 November 1748.		
49	49th Regiment of Foot 1751–1782 49th (Hertfordshire) Regiment of Foot 1782–1816; 49th (Hertfordshire - Princess Charlotte of Wales's) Regiment of Foot 1816–1881	1743; Raised 1743 as Edward Trelawney's Regiment of Foot. Ranked 63rd, renumbered 49th in 1748 on disbandment of ten regiments of marines.	1881: 1st Battalion, The Princess Charlotte of Wales's (Berkshire Regiment)	The Rifles
50	50th Regiment of Foot (7th Marines)1739–1748	1740; Raised 1740 as Henry Cornewall's Regiment of Marines: ranked as 50th Foot or 7th Marines by 1741. Disbanded 3 November 1748.		
50	50th Regiment of Foot (American Provincials)1754–1756	1754; Raised 1754 in New England, as a reforming of William Shirley's Regiment of 1745–1749. Disbanded 1756.		
50	50th Regiment of Foot 1757–1782 50th (West Kent) Regiment of Foot 1782–1827; 50th (The Duke of Clarence's) Regiment of Foot 1827–1831; 50th (The Queen's Own) Regiment of Foot	1755; Raised 1755 as the 52nd Regiment of Foot. Renumbered as 50th Foot in 1757 following disbandment of existing 50th and 51st Foot.	1881: 1st Battalion, The Queen's Own (Royal West Kent Regiment)	Princess of Wales's Royal Regiment

=== 51st–60th foot ===
Number	Titles	Date of raising or coming onto establishment	Fate	Successor 2012
51	51st Regiment of Foot (8th Marines) 1739–1748	1740; Raised 1740 as William Hanmer's Regiment of Marines, ranked as 51st Foot or 8th Marines by 1741. Disbanded 8 November 1748.		
51	51st Regiment of Foot (Cape Breton Regiment) 1754–1756	1754; Raised 1754 in New England as a reforming of William Pepperell's Regiment of 1745–1749. Disbanded 1756.		
51	51st Regiment of Foot 1757–1782 51st (2nd Yorkshire, West Riding) Regiment of Foot 1782–1809; 51st (2nd Yorkshire, West Riding, Light Infantry) Regiment of Foot 1809–1821; 51st (2nd Yorkshire, West Riding, The King's Own Light Infantry) Regiment of Foot 1821–1881	1755; Raised as 53rd Regiment of Foot 1755, renumbered 51st in 1757 on disbandment of existing 50th and 51st Foot.	1881: 1st Battalion, The King's Own Light Infantry (South Yorkshire Regiment)	The Rifles
52	52nd Regiment of Foot (9th Marines)1740–1748	1740; Raised 1740 as Sir Charles Powlett's Regiment of Marines, ranked as 52nd Foot or 9th Marines by 1741. Disbanded 7 November 1748.		
52	52nd Regiment of Foot 1755–1757	1755; Raised 1755, Renumbered as 50th Foot (see above) 1757.		
52	52nd Regiment of Foot 1757–1782 52nd (Oxfordshire) Regiment of Foot 1782–1803; 52nd (Oxfordshire Light Infantry) Regiment of Foot 1803–1821	1755; Raised as 54th Regiment of Foot 1755, renumbered 52nd in 1757 on disbandment of existing 50th and 51st Foot.	1881: 2nd Battalion, The Oxfordshire Light Infantry	The Rifles
53	53rd Regiment of Foot (10th Marines)1740–1748	1740; Raised 31 November 1740 as Jefferie's Regiment of Marines, ranked as 53rd Foot or 10th Marines by 1741. Disbanded 11 November 1748.		
53	53rd Regiment of Foot 1755–1757	1755; Raised 1755, Renumbered as 51st Foot (see above) 1757.		
53	53rd Regiment of Foot 1757–1782 53rd (Shropshire) Regiment of Foot 1782–1881	1755; Raised as 55th Regiment of Foot 1755, renumbered 53rd in 1757 on disbandment of existing 50th and 51st Foot.	1881: 1st Battalion, The King's Light Infantry (Shropshire Regiment)	The Rifles
54	54th Regiment of Foot 1741–1748	1741; Raised 1 March 1741 as Thomas Fowke's Regiment of Foot, ranked as 54th foot in 1747. Renumbered as 43rd in 1748/49 (see above) on disbandment of a number of regiments.		
54	54th Regiment of Foot 1755–1757	1755; Raised 1755, renumbered 52nd in 1757 (see above) on disbandment of existing 50th and 51st Foot.		
54	54th Regiment of Foot 1757–1782 54th (West Norfolk) Regiment of Foot 1782–1881	1755; Raised 1755 as 56th Regiment of Foot, renumbered as 54th in 1757 on disbandment of existing 50th and 51st Foot.	1881: 2nd Battalion, The Dorsetshire Regiment	The Rifles
55	55th Regiment of Foot 1741–1748	1741; Raised 7 January 1741 as James Long's Regiment of Foot, Renumbered as 44th in 1748 (see above) on disbandment of a number of regiments.		
55	55th Regiment of Foot 1755–1757	1755; Raised as 55th Regiment of Foot 1755, renumbered 53rd (see above) in 1757 on disbandment of existing 50th and 51st Foot.		
55	55th Regiment of Foot 1757–1782 55th (Westmorland) Regiment of Foot 1782–1881	1755; Raised 1755 as 57th Regiment of Foot, renumbered as 55th in 1757 on disbandment of existing 50th and 51st Foot.	1881: 2nd Battalion, The Border Regiment	Duke of Lancaster's Regiment
56	56th Regiment of Foot 1741–1748	1741; Raised 11 January 1741 as Daniel Houghton's Regiment of Foot. Ranked 56th, renumbered 45th (see above) in 1748 on disbandment of ten regiments of marines.		
56	56th Regiment of Foot 1755–1757	1755; Raised 1755 as 56th Regiment of Foot, renumbered as 54th (see above) in 1757 on disbandment of existing 50th and 51st Foot.		
56	56th Regiment of Foot 1757–1782 56th (West Essex) Regiment of Foot 1782–1881	1755; Raised 1755 as 58th Regiment of Foot, renumbered as 56th in 1757 on disbandment of existing 50th and 51st Foot.	1881: 2nd Battalion, The Essex Regiment	Royal Anglian Regiment
57	57th Regiment of Foot 1741–1748	1741; Raised 13 January 1741 as John Price's Regiment of Foot, ranked as 57th, renumbered 46th (see above) in 1748 on disbandment of ten regiments of marines.		
57	57th Regiment of Foot 1755–1757	1755; Raised 1755 as 57th Regiment of Foot, renumbered as 55th in 1757 on disbandment of existing 50th and 51st Foot.		
57	57th Regiment of Foot 1757–1782 57th (West Middlesex) Regiment of Foot 1782–1881	1755; Raised 1755 as 59th Regiment of Foot, renumbered as 57th in 1757 on disbandment of existing 50th and 51st Foot.	1881: 1st Battalion, The Duke of Cambridge's Own (Middlesex Regiment)	Princess of Wales's Royal Regiment
58	58th Regiment of Foot 1741–1748	1741; Raised 15 January 1741 as Sir John Mordaunt's Regiment of Foot, ranked as 58th, renumbered 47th (see above) in 1748 on disbandment of ten regiments of marines.		
58	58th Regiment of Foot 1755–1757	1755; Raised 1755 as 58th Regiment of Foot, renumbered as 56th in 1757 on disbandment of existing 50th and 51st Foot.		
58	58th Regiment of Foot 1757–1782 58th (Rutlandshire) Regiment of Foot 1782–1881	1755; Raised 1755 as 60th Regiment of Foot, renumbered as 58th in 1757 on disbandment of existing 50th and 51st Foot.	1881: 2nd Battalion, The Northamptonshire Regiment	Royal Anglian Regiment
59	59th Regiment of Foot 1741–1748	1741; Raised 31 January 1741 as James Cholmondeley's Regiment of Foot, ranked as 59th, renumbered 48th (see above) in 1748 on disbandment of ten regiments of marines.		
59	59th Regiment of Foot 1755–1757	1755; Raised 1755 as 59th Regiment of Foot, renumbered as 57th (see above) in 1757 on disbandment of existing 50th and 51st Foot.		
59	59th Regiment of Foot 1757–1782 59th (2nd Nottinghamshire) Regiment of Foot 1782–1881	1755; Raised 1755 as 61st Regiment of Foot, renumbered as 59th in 1757 on disbandment of existing 50th and 51st Foot.	1881: 2nd Battalion, The East Lancashire Regiment	Duke of Lancaster's Regiment
60	60th Regiment of Foot 1741–1748	1741; Raised 1741, disbanded 1748.		
60	60th Regiment of Foot 1755–1757	1755; Raised 1755 as the 60th Regiment of Foot. Renumbered as 58th (see above) in 1757 following disbandment of existing 50th and 51st Foot.		
60	60th (Royal American) Regiment of Foot 1757–1824 60th (The Duke of York's Own Rifle Corps) Regiment of Foot 1824–1830; 60th (The King's Royal Rifle Corps) Regiment of Foot 1830–1881	Raised as 62nd (Royal American) Regiment of Foot in 1755, renumbered as 60th in 1757 on disbandment of existing 50th and 51st Foot.	1881: The King's Royal Rifle Corps	The Rifles

=== 61st–70th foot ===
Number	Titles	Date of raising or coming onto establishment	Fate	Successor 2012
61	61st Regiment of Foot 1742	1742; Formed from disbanded Gooch's Marines (see 43rd foot above), disbanded 1742.		
61	61st Regiment of Foot 1742–1748	1742; Raised 1742 in Ireland, disbanded 1748.		
61	61st Regiment of Foot 1755–1757	1755; Raised 1755, Renumbered as 59th Foot (see above) 1757.		
61	61st Regiment of Foot 1757–1758	1756; Raised late 1756, Renumbered as 76th Foot in 1758 when second battalions of several regiments raised in 1756 were constituted as 61st to 75th Regiments of Foot. The second battalion of the 61st Foot was redesignated as the 86th Regiment of Foot at the same time.		
61	61st Regiment of Foot 1758–1782 61st (South Gloucestershire) Regiment of Foot 1782–1881	1758; Raised as 2nd Battalion, 3rd Regiment of Foot 1756, reconstituted as 61st Regiment of Foot 1758.	1881: 2nd Battalion, The Gloucestershire Regiment	The Rifles
62	62nd Regiment of Foot 1742–1748	1742; Raised 1742 as John Batereau's Regiment of Marines, ranked as 62nd Foot. Disbanded 1748.		
62	62nd (Royal American) Regiment of Foot 1755–1757	1755; Raised 1755, Renumbered as 60th Foot (see above) 1757.		
62	62nd Regiment of Foot (1st Highland Battalion)1757–1758 (Montgomerie's Highlanders)	1756; Raised late 1756, Renumbered as 77th Foot in 1758 when second battalions of several regiments raised in 1756 were constituted as 61st to 75th Regiments of Foot.		
62	62nd Regiment of Foot 1758–1782 62nd (Wiltshire) Regiment of Foot 1782–1881	1756; Raised as 2nd Battalion, 4th Regiment of Foot 1756, reconstituted as 62nd Regiment of Foot 1758.	1881: 1st Battalion, The Duke of Edinburgh's (Wiltshire Regiment)	The Rifles
63	63rd (American) Regiment of Foot 1744–1748	1743; Raised 1743 as Edward Trelawney's Regiment of Foot. Ranked 63rd, renumbered 49th in 1748 on disbandment of ten regiments of marines.		
63	63rd Regiment of Foot (2nd Highland Battalion)1757–1758 (Fraser's Highlanders)	1756; Raised late 1756, Renumbered as 78th Foot in 1758 when second battalions of several regiments raised in 1756 were constituted as 61st to 75th Regiments of Foot.		
63	63rd Regiment of Foot 1758–1782 63rd (West Suffolk) Regiment of Foot 1782–1881	1757; Raised as 2nd Battalion, 8th Regiment of Foot 1756, reconstituted as 63rd Regiment of Foot 1758.	1881: 1st Battalion, The Manchester Regiment	Duke of Lancaster's Regiment
64	64th Regiment of Foot 1745–1748	1745; Raised 28 August 1745 as Earl of Loudoun's Regiment, ranked as 64th, disbanded 1748.		
64	64th Regiment of Foot 1757–1758	1757; Raised 1757, Renumbered as 79th Foot in 1758 when second battalions of several regiments raised in 1756 were constituted as 61st to 75th Regiments of Foot.		
64	64th Regiment of Foot 1758–1782 64th (2nd Staffordshire) Regiment of Foot 1782–1881	1756; Raised as 2nd Battalion, 11th Regiment of Foot 1756, reconstituted as 64th Regiment of Foot 1758.	1881: 1st Battalion, The Prince of Wales's (North Staffordshire Regiment)	Mercian Regiment
65	65th Regiment of Foot (Shirley's) 1745–1749	1745; Raised September 1745 in New England. Disbanded 1749.		
65	65th Regiment of Foot 1758–1782 65th (2nd Yorkshire, North Riding) Regiment of Foot 1782–1881	1758; Raised as 2nd Battalion, 12th Regiment of Foot 1756, reconstituted as 65th Regiment of Foot 1758.	1881: 1st Battalion, The York and Lancaster Regiment	Disbanded 1968.
66	66th Regiment of Foot (Pepperell's) 1745–1749	1745; Raised September 1745 in New England. Disbanded 1749.		
66	66th Regiment of Foot 1758–1782 66th (Berkshire) Regiment of Foot 1782–1881	1758; Raised as 2nd Battalion, 19th Regiment of Foot 1756, reconstituted as 66th Regiment of Foot 1758.	1881: 2nd Battalion, The Princess Charlotte of Wales's (Berkshire Regiment)	The Rifles
67	67th Regiment of Foot 1745–1746	1745; Raised 1745 as the Duke of Bolton's Regiment, ranked as 67th Foot. Disbanded 1746.		
67	67th Regiment of Foot 1758–1782 67th (South Hampshire) Regiment of Foot 1782–1881	1758; Raised as 2nd Battalion, 20th Regiment of Foot 1756, reconstituted as 67th Regiment of Foot 1758.	1881: 2nd Battalion, The Hampshire Regiment	Princess of Wales's Royal Regiment
68	68th Regiment of Foot 1745–1746	1745; Raised 1745 as the Duke of Bedford's Regiment, ranked as 68th Foot. Disbanded 1746.		
68	68th Regiment of Foot 1758–1782 68th (Durham) Regiment of Foot 1782–1812; 68th (Durham - Light Infantry) Regiment of Foot 1812–1881	1758; Raised as 2nd Battalion, 23rd Regiment of Foot 1756, reconstituted as 68th Regiment of Foot 1758.	1881: 1st Battalion, The Durham Light Infantry	The Rifles
69	69th Regiment of Foot 1745–1746	1745; Raised 1745 as the Duke of Montagu's Regiment, ranked as 69th Foot. Disbanded 1746.		
69	69th Regiment of Foot 1758–1782 69th (South Lincolnshire) Regiment of Foot 1782–1881	1756; Raised as 2nd Battalion, 24th Regiment of Foot 1756, reconstituted as 69th Regiment of Foot 1758.	1881: 2nd Battalion, The Welsh Regiment	The Royal Welsh
70	70th Regiment of Foot 1745–1746	1745; Raised 1745 as the Duke of Ancaster's Regiment, ranked as 70th Foot. Disbanded 1746.		
70	70th Regiment of Foot 1758–1782 70th (Surrey) Regiment of Foot 1782–1812; 70th (Glasgow Lowland) Regiment of Foot 1812–1825; 70th (Surrey) Regiment of Foot 1825–1881	1756; Raised as 2nd Battalion, 31st Regiment of Foot 1756, reconstituted as 70th Regiment of Foot 1758.	1881: 2nd Battalion, The East Surrey Regiment	The Princess of Wales's Royal Regiment

=== 71st–80th foot ===
Number	Titles	Date of raising or coming onto establishment	Fate	Successor 2012
71	71st Regiment of Foot 1745–1746	1745; Raised 1745 as the Duke of Rutland's Regiment, ranked as 71st Foot. Disbanded 1746.		
71	71st Regiment of Foot 1758–1763	1758; Raised as 2nd Battalion, 32nd Regiment of Foot 1756, reconstituted as 71st Regiment of Foot 1758. Disbanded 1763.		
71	71st (Invalids) Regiment of Foot 1764–1769	1757; Raised 1757 as 81st (Invalids) Regiment of Foot, renumbered 71st in 1764 following disbandment of a number of senior regiments. Dispersed to independent garrison companies in 1768/69.		
71	71st (Highland) Regiment of Foot 1775–1786 (Fraser's Highlanders)	1775; Raised October 1775 in Scottish Highlands for service in North America. Disbanded 1786.		
71	71st (Highland) Regiment of Foot 1786–1808 71st (Glasgow Highland) Regiment of Foot 1808–1809; 71st (Glasgow Highland Light Infantry) Regiment of Foot 1809–1810; 71st (Highland Light Infantry) Regiment of Foot 1810–1881	1777; Formed as 73rd (Highland) Regiment of Foot 1777 by regimentation of independent companies raised in 1771, renumbered as 71st in 1786 on disbandment of existing 71st and 72nd Foot.	1881: 1st Battalion, The Highland Light Infantry	Royal Regiment of Scotland
72	72nd Regiment of Foot 1745–1746	1745; Raised 1745 as Lord Berkeley's Regiment, ranked as 72nd Foot. Disbanded 1746.		
72	72nd Regiment of Foot 1758–1763	1758; Raised as 2nd Battalion, 33rd Regiment of Foot 1756, reconstituted as 72nd Regiment of Foot 1758. Disbanded 1763.		
72	72nd (Invalids) Regiment of Foot 1764–1769	1757; Raised 1757 as 82nd (Invalids) Regiment of Foot, renumbered 72nd in 1764 following disbandment of a number of senior regiments. Dispersed to independent garrison companies in 1768/69.		
72	72nd (Royal Manchester Volunteers) Regiment of Foot 1777–1784	1777; Raised December 1777. Disbanded 1784.		
72	72nd (Highland) Regiment of Foot 1786–1809 72nd Regiment of Foot 1809–1823; 72nd (Duke of Albany's Own Highlanders) Regiment of Foot 1823–1881	1778; Formed as 78th (Highland) Regiment of Foot 1778 (or Seaforth's Highlanders), renumbered as 72nd 12 September 1786 on disbandment of a number of senior regiments.	1881: 1st Battalion, The Seaforth Highlanders (Ross-shire Buffs, The Duke of Albany's)	Royal Regiment of Scotland
73	73rd Regiment of Foot 1745–1746	1745; Raised 1745 as Lord Cholmondeley's Regiment, ranked as 73rd Foot. Disbanded 1746.		
73	73rd Regiment of Foot 1758–1763	1758; Raised as 2nd Battalion, 34th Regiment of Foot 1756, reconstituted as 73rd Regiment of Foot 1758. Disbanded 1763.		
73	73rd (Invalids) Regiment of Foot 1764–1769	1762; Raised 1762 as 116th (Invalids) Regiment of Foot, renumbered 73rd in 1764 following disbandment of a number of senior regiments. Dispersed to independent garrison companies in 1769.		
73	73rd (Highland) Regiment of Foot 1777–1786	1777; Formed 1777 by regimentation of independent companies raised in 1771, renumbered as 71st (see above) in 1786 on disbandment of existing 71st and 72nd Foot.		
73	73rd (Highland) Regiment of Foot 1786–1809 73rd Regiment of Foot 1809–1862; 73rd (Perthshire) Regiment of Foot 1862–1881	1780; Raised as 2nd Battalion, 42nd (Highland) Regiment of Foot 1780, reconstituted as 73rd Regiment of Foot 1786.	1881: 2nd Battalion, The Black Watch	Royal Regiment of Scotland
74	74th Regiment of Foot 1745–1746	1745; Raised 1745 as Lord Halifax's Regiment, ranked as 74th Foot. Disbanded 1746.		
74	74th Regiment of Foot 1758–1763	1758; Raised as 2nd Battalion, 36th Regiment of Foot 1756, reconstituted as 74th Regiment of Foot 1758. Disbanded 1763.		
74	74th (Invalids) Regiment of Foot 1764–1769	1762; Raised 1762 as 117th (Invalids) Regiment of Foot, renumbered 74th in 1764 following disbandment of a number of senior regiments. Dispersed to independent garrison companies in 1769.		
74	74th Regiment of Foot 1777–1784 (Argyleshire Highlanders)	1777; Raised 1777, disbanded 1784.		
74	74th (Highland) Regiment of Foot 1787–1816 74th Regiment of Foot 1816–1845; 74th (Highlanders) Regiment of Foot 1845–1881	1787 Raised by Honourable East India Company for service in India	1881: 2nd Battalion, The Highland Light Infantry	Royal Regiment of Scotland
75	75th Regiment of Foot 1745–1746	1745; Raised 1745 as Lord Falmouth's Regiment, ranked as 75th Foot. Disbanded 1746.		
75	75th Regiment of Foot 1758–1763	1758; Raised as 2nd Battalion, 37th Regiment of Foot 1756, reconstituted as 75th Regiment of Foot 1758. Disbanded 1763.		
75	75th (Invalids) Regiment of Foot 1764–1769	1762; Raised 1760 as 118th (Invalids) Regiment of Foot, renumbered 75th in 1764 following disbandment of a number of senior regiments. Dispersed to independent garrison companies in 1769.		
75	75th Regiment of Foot (Prince of Wales's Regiment)1778–1783	1778; Raised in Wales 1778, disbanded 1783.		
75	75th (Highland) Regiment of Foot 1787–1809 75th Regiment of Foot 1809–1862; 75th (Stirlingshire) Regiment of Foot 1862–1881	1787; Raised by Honourable East India Company for service in India	1881: 1st Battalion, The Gordon Highlanders	Royal Regiment of Scotland
76	76th Regiment of Foot 1745–1746	1745; Raised 1745 as Lord Harcourt's Regiment, ranked as 76th Foot. Disbanded 1746.		
76	76th Regiment of Foot 1758–1763	1756; Raised late 1756 as 61st Regiment of Foot, renumbered as 76th in 1758 when second battalions of several regiments raised in 1756 were constituted as 61st to 75th Regiments of Foot. Disbanded 1763.		
76	76th Regiment of Foot (MacDonald's Highlanders) 1777–1784	1756; Raised 1777, disbanded 1784.		
76	76th (Hindoostan) Regiment of Foot 1787–1812 76th Regiment of Foot 1812–1881	1787; Raised by Honourable East India Company for service in India.	1881: 2nd Battalion, The Duke of Wellington's (West Riding Regiment)	Royal Yorkshire Regiment
77	77th Regiment of Foot 1745–1746	1745; Raised 1745 as Lord Gower's Regiment, ranked as 77th Foot. Disbanded 1746.		
77	77th Regiment of Foot 1758–1763 (Montgomery's Highlanders)	1756; Raised late 1756 as 62nd Foot, renumbered as 77th Foot in 1758 when second battalions of several regiments raised in 1756 were constituted as 61st to 75th Regiments of Foot.		
77	77th Regiment of Foot1777–1783 (Atholl Highlanders)	1777; Raised 1777, disbanded 1783.		
77	77th (Hindoostan) Regiment of Foot 1787–1807 77th (East Middlesex) Regiment of Foot 1807–1876; 77th (East Middlesex) Regiment of Foot (Duke of Cambridge's Own) 1876–1881	1787; Raised by Honourable East India Company for service in India.	1881: 2nd Battalion, The Duke of Cambridge's Own (Middlesex Regiment)	Princess of Wales's Royal Regiment
78	78th Regiment of Foot 1745–1746	1745; Raised 1745 as Lord Herbert's Regiment, ranked as 78th Foot. Disbanded 1746.		
78	78th Regiment of Foot 1758–1763 (Fraser's Highlanders)	1756; Raised late 1756 as 63rd Foot, renumbered as 78th Foot in 1758 when second battalions of several regiments raised in 1756 were constituted as 61st to 75th Regiments of Foot.		
78	78th (Highland) Regiment of Foot 1777–1783	1778; Raised 1778, renumbered 72nd in 1786.		
78	78th (Highland) Regiment of Foot (The Ross-shire Buffs) 1793–1881	1793; Raised 17 August 1793.	1881: 2nd Battalion, The Seaforth Highlanders	Royal Regiment of Scotland
79	79th Regiment of Foot 1745–1746	1745; Raised 1745 as Lord Edgcumbe's Regiment, ranked as 79th Foot. Disbanded 1746.		
79	79th Regiment of Foot 1758–1763	1757; Raised 1757 as 64th Foot, Renumbered as 79th Foot in 1758 when second battalions of several regiments raised in 1756 were constituted as 61st to 75th Regiments of Foot. Disbanded 1763.		
79	79th (Royal Liverpool Volunteers) Regiment of Foot 1778–1784	1757; Raised 1778, disbanded 1784.		
79	79th (Cameronian Volunteers) Regiment of Foot 1793–1804 79th (Cameronian Highlanders) Regiment of Foot 1804–1866; 79th (Cameron Highlanders) Regiment of Foot 1866–1873; 79th (Queen's Own Cameron Highlanders) Regiment of Foot 1873–1881	1793; Raised 16 August 1793.	1881: Queen's Own Cameron Highlanders	Royal Regiment of Scotland
80	80th (Light Armed) Regiment of Foot 1758–1764	1758; Raised 1758, disbanded 1764.		
80	80th (Royal Edinburgh Volunteers) Regiment of Foot 1778–1784	1758; Raised 1778, disbanded 1784.		
80	80th (Staffordshire Volunteers) Regiment of Foot 1793–1881	1793; Raised 1793 from the Staffordshire Militia.	1881: 2nd Battalion, The South Staffordshire Regiment	Mercian Regiment

=== 81st–90th foot ===
Number	Titles	Date of raising or coming onto establishment	Fate	Successor 2012
81	81st (Invalids) Regiment of Foot 1757–1764	1757; Raised 1757 as 81st (Invalids) Regiment of Foot, renumbered 71st (see above) in 1764 following disbandment of a number of senior regiments.		
81	81st Regiment of Foot 1778–1783 (Aberdeenshire Highland Regiment)	1778; Raised 1777 as Aberdeenshire Highland Regiment, numbered 81st in 1778. Disbanded 1783.		
81	81st Regiment of Foot 1793	1793; Raised and disbanded in 1793		
81	81st (Loyal Lincoln Volunteers) Regiment of Foot 1793–1794 81st Regiment of Foot 1794–1832; 81st (Loyal Lincoln Volunteers) Regiment of Foot 1832–1881	1793; Raised as 83rd Foot in 1793, renumbered in 1794 on disbandment of existing 81st and 82nd Regiments.	1881:2nd Battalion, The Loyal North Lancashire Regiment	Duke of Lancaster's Regiment
82	82nd (Invalids) Regiment of Foot 1757–1764	1757; Raised 1757 as 82nd (Invalids) Regiment of Foot, renumbered 72nd (see above) in 1764 following disbandment of a number of senior regiments.		
82	82nd Regiment of Foot 1778–1783	1777; Raised 1777 for service in North America. Numbered 1778. Disbanded 1783.		
82	82nd Regiment of Foot 1793	1793; Raised and disbanded in 1793		
82	82nd Regiment of Foot 1793–1802 82nd (The Prince of Wales's Volunteers) Regiment of Foot 1802–1881	1793; Raised as 84th Foot on 27 September 1793, renumbered in same year of disbandment of existing 81st and 82nd Regiments.	1881:2nd Battalion, The Prince of Wales's Volunteers (South Lancashire Regiment)	Duke of Lancaster's Regiment
83	83rd Regiment of Foot 1758–1763	1758; Raised 1758. Disbanded 1763.		
83	83rd (Royal Glasgow Volunteers) Regiment of Foot 1778–1783	1778; Raised 1778, disbanded 1783.		
83	83rd (Loyal Lincoln Volunteers) Regiment of Foot 1793–1794	1793; Raised as 83rd Foot in 1793, renumbered 81st (see above) in same year of disbandment of existing 81st and 82nd Regiments.		
83	83rd Regiment of Foot 1794–1859 83rd (County of Dublin) Regiment of Foot 1859–1881	1793; Raised as Colonel Commandant William Fitch's Corps in Dublin, September 1793. Numbered 83rd in 1794.	1881: 1st Battalion, The Royal Irish Rifles	Royal Irish Regiment
84	84th Regiment of Foot1758–1764	1758; Raised 1758 by Eyre Coote for service in India. Disbanded 1764.		
84	84th (Royal Highland Emigrants) Regiment of Foot 1778–1783	1775; Raised 1775 in North America from veterans of Highland regiments, placed on British establishment in 1778 as 84th Foot, disbanded 1783.		
84	84th Regiment of Foot 1793–1809 84th (York and Lancaster) Regiment of Foot 1809–1881	1793; Raised 1793.	1881: 2nd Battalion, York and Lancaster Regiment	Disbanded 1968
85	85th (Royal Volunteers Light Infantry) Regiment of Foot 1759–1763	1759; Raised 1759. Disbanded 1763.		
85	85th (Westminster Volunteers) Regiment of Foot 1778–1783	1778; Raised 1778, disbanded 1783.		
85	85th (Bucks Volunteers) Regiment of Foot 1794–1808 85th (Bucks Volunteers) (Light Infantry) Regiment of Foot 1808–1815; 85th (Bucks Volunteers) (Duke of York's Light Infantry) Regiment of Foot 1815–1821; 85th (Bucks Volunteers) (The King's Light Infantry) Regiment of Foot 1821–1881	1794; Raised 1794.	1881: 2nd Battalion, The King's (Shropshire Light Infantry)	The Rifles
86	86th Regiment of Foot 1759–1763	1759; Formed 1759 by redesignation of the 2nd Battalion, 76th Foot. Disbanded 1763.		
86	86th Regiment of Foot 1779–1783	1779; Raised 1779, disbanded 1783.		
86	86th (Shropshire Volunteers) Regiment of Foot 1794–1809 86th (The Leinster) Regiment of Foot 1809–1812; 86th (Royal County Down) Regiment of Foot 1812–1881	1794; Raised 1793 as Sir Cornelius Cuyler's Shropshire Volunteers, placed on regular establishment as 86th Foot in 1794.	1881: 2nd Battalion, The Royal Irish Rifles	Royal Irish Regiment
87	87th Regiment of Foot 1759–1763 (Keith's Highlanders)	1759; Raised late 1759 from companies of 2nd Battalion, 42nd Highlanders. Disbanded 1763.		
87	87th Regiment of Foot 1779–1783	1779; Raised 1779, disbanded 1783.		
87	87th (The Prince of Wales's Irish) Regiment of Foot 1787–1811 87th (The Prince of Wales's Own Irish) Regiment of Foot 1811–1827; 87th (The Prince of Wales's Own Irish Fusiliers) Regiment of Foot 1827; 87th (Royal Irish Fusiliers) Regiment of Foot 1827–1881	1793; Raised 1793.	1881: 1st Battalion, The Princess Victoria's (Royal Irish Fusiliers)	Royal Irish Regiment
88	88th (Highland Volunteers) Regiment of Foot 1760–1763	1760; Raised 1760, also known as Campbell's Highlanders. Disbanded 1763		
88	88th Regiment of Foot 1779–1783	1779; Raised 1779, disbanded 1783.		
88	88th (Connaught Rangers) Regiment of Foot 1793–1881	1793; Raised 1793.	1881: 1st Battalion, The Connaught Rangers	Disbanded 1922
89	89th (Highland) Regiment of Foot 1759–1763	1759; Raised 1759, also known as Morris's Highlanders. Disbanded 1765.		
89	89th Regiment of Foot 1779–1783	1779; Raised 1779, disbanded 1783.		
89	89th Regiment of Foot 1793–1866 89th (Princess Victoria's) Regiment of Foot 1866–1881	1793; Raised 1793.	1881: 1st Battalion, The Princess Victoria's (Royal Irish Fusiliers)	Royal Irish Regiment
90	90th (Irish Light Infantry) Regiment of Foot 1759–1763	1759; Raised 1759, disbanded 1763.		
90	90th (Yorkshire Volunteers) Regiment of Foot 1779–1783	1779; Raised 1779, disbanded 1783.		
90	90th (Perthshire Volunteers) Regiment of Foot 1794–1815 90th (Perthshire Light Infantry) Regiment of Foot	1794; Raised 1794.	1881: 2nd Battalion, The Cameronians (Scottish Rifles)	Disbanded 1968

=== 91st–100th foot ===
Number	Titles	Date of raising or coming onto establishment	Fate	Successor 2012
91	91st Regiment of Foot 1759–1763	1759; Raised 1759, disbanded 1763.		
91	91st (Shropshire Volunteers) Regiment of Foot 1779–1783	1779; Raised 1779. Disbanded 1783.		
91	91st Regiment of Foot 1794–1795	1793; Raised as John Fletcher Campbell's Regiment of Foot in 1793, numbered 91st in 1794. Disbanded 1795.		
91	91st (Argyllshire Highlanders) Regiment of Foot 1796–1809 91st Regiment of Foot 1809–1821; 91st (Argyllshire) Regiment of Foot 1821–1864; 91st (Argyllshire Highlanders) Regiment of Foot 1864–1872; 91st (Princess Louise's Argyllshire Highlanders) Regiment of Foot 1872–1881	1794; Raised as 98th Foot in 1794, renumbered in 1796 on disbandment of a number of regiments.	1881:1st Battalion, The Princess Louise's (Argyll and Sutherland Highlanders)	Royal Regiment of Scotland
92	92nd (Donegal Light Infantry) Regiment of Foot 1760–1763	1760; Raised 1760, disbanded 1763.		
92	92nd Regiment of Foot 1779–1783	1779; Raised 1779. Disbanded 1783.		
92	92nd Regiment of Foot 1794–1795	1793; Raised as George Hewett's Regiment of Foot 1793, numbered as 92nd in 1794, disbanded 1795.		
92	92nd (Highland) Regiment of Foot 1798–1861 92nd (Gordon Highlanders) Regiment of Foot 1861–1881	1793; Raised as 100th Foot in 1794, renumbered in 1798 on disbandment of a number of regiments.	1881:2nd Battalion, The Gordon Highlanders	Royal Regiment of Scotland
93	93rd Regiment of Foot 1760–1763	1760; Raised 1760. Disbanded 1763.		
93	93rd Regiment of Foot 1779–1783	1779; Raised 1779, disbanded 1783.		
93	93rd (Highland) Regiment of Foot 1794–1796	1793; Raised 1793 as Nesbitt Balfour's Regiment of Foot, numbered 93rd in 1794. Served in West Indies, drafted into 39th Foot on return to England 1796.		
93	93rd (Highland) Regiment of Foot 1799–1861 93rd (Sutherland Highlanders) Regiment of Foot 1861–1881	1799; Raised 1799.	1881:2nd Battalion, The Princess Louise's (Argyll and Sutherland Highlanders)	Royal Regiment of Scotland
94	94th Regiment of Foot (Royal Welsh Volunteers) 1760–1763	1760; Raised 1760 for service in North America. Disbanded 1763.		
94	94th Regiment of Foot 1780–1783	1780; Raised 1780, disbanded 1783.		
94	94th (Irish) Regiment of Foot 1794–1796	1793; Raised 1794, disbanded 1796.		
94	94th (Scots Brigade) Regiment of Foot 1802–1818	1794; Scots Brigade, raised for Dutch service in 1568, placed on the British Establishment in 1794. Numbered in 1802. Disbanded in 1818.		
94	94th Regiment of Foot 1823–1881	1823; Raised 1823. In 1875 was deemed to be the successor of the 94th Foot of 1802–1818.	1881: 2nd Battalion, The Connaught Rangers	Disbanded 1922
95	95th Regiment of Foot 1760–1763	1760; Raised in North Carolina in 1760. Disbanded 1763.		
95	95th Regiment of Foot 1780–1783	1780; Raised 1780, disbanded 1784.		
95	95th Regiment of Foot 1794–1796	1793; William Edmeston's Regiment of Foot raised 1793, numbered 1794. Disbanded 1796.		
95	95th Regiment of Foot 1802–1812 95th Regiment of Foot (Riflemen) 1812–1816	1800; Corps of Riflemen raised 1800, numbered 95th Foot in 1802. Redesignated as the Rifle Brigade without a number in 1816.		The Rifles
95	95th Regiment of Foot 1816–1818	1803 Raised as 96th Regiment of Foot in 1803. Renumbered as 95th in 1816 when existing 95th Foot became Rifle Brigade without a number. Disbanded 1818.		
95	95th Regiment of Foot 1823–1825 95th (Derbyshire) Regiment of Foot 1825–1881	1823; Raised 1823	1881: 2nd Battalion, The Sherwood Foresters (Derbyshire Regiment)	Mercian Regiment
96	96th Regiment of Foot 1760–1763	1760; Formed 1760 for service in India. Disbanded 1763.		
96	96th Regiment of Foot (British Musketeers) 1780–1784	1779; Raised 1780, disbanded 1784.		
96	96th (Queen's Royal Irish) Regiment of Foot 1794–1796	1794; Raised as John Murray's Regiment of Foot 1793, numbered 96th in 1794, disbanded 1796.		
96	96th Regiment of Foot 1803–1816	1803; Raised as 2nd Battalion, 52nd Foot in 1799, constituted as 96th Foot in 1803, renumbered as 95th in 1816 when existing 95th Foot became Rifle Brigade without a number.		
96	96th (Queen's Own Germans) Regiment of Foot 1816–1818	1816; 97th Foot (see below), renumbered as 96th in 1816 when existing 95th Foot became Rifle Brigade without a number. Disbanded 1818.		
96	96th Regiment of Foot 1824–1881	1824; Raised 1824. Deemed in 1874 to be the successor to the 96th Foot of 1816–1818.	1881: 2nd Battalion, The Manchester Regiment	Duke of Lancaster's Regiment
97	97th Regiment of Foot 1760–1763	1760; Raised 1760. Disbanded 1763.		
97	97th Regiment of Foot 1780–1784	1780; Raised 1780, disbanded 1784.		
97	97th Regiment of Foot (Inverness-shire Highlanders) 1794–1795	1794; Raised 1794 as Strathspey Highland Regiment, numbered in same year. Disbanded 1795.		
97	97th (Queen's Own Germans) Regiment of Foot 1805–1816	1798; Raised 1798 as The Minorca Regiment, redesignated the Queen's own German Regiment in 1802, numbered in 1805. renumbered as 96th (see above) in 1816 when existing 95th Foot became Rifle Brigade without a number.		
97	97th Regiment of Foot 1816–1818	1804; Raised 1760 as 98th Foot, renumbered as 97th (see above) in 1816 when existing 95th Foot became Rifle Brigade without a number. Disbanded 1818.		
97	97th (The Earl of Ulster's) Regiment of Foot 1824–1881	1824; Raised 1824.	1881: 2nd Battalion, The Queen's Own (Royal West Kent Regiment)	Princess of Wales's Royal Regiment
98	98th Regiment of Foot 1760–1763	1760; Raised 1760. Disbanded 1763.		
98	98th Regiment of Foot 1779–1784	1779; Raised 1779, disbanded 1784.		
98	98th Regiment of Foot (Argyllshire Highlanders) 1794–1795	1794; Raised 1794, renumbered 91st (see above) in 1796 on disbandment of a number of regiments.		
98	98th Regiment of Foot 1805–1816	1805; Raised 1805, renumbered as 97th (see above) in 1816 when existing 95th Foot became Rifle Brigade without a number.		
98	98th (Prince of Wales's Tipperary) Regiment of Foot 1816–1818	1804; Raised 1804 as 99th Foot, renumbered as 98th in 1816 when existing 95th Foot became Rifle Brigade without a number. Disbanded 1818.		
98	98th Regiment of Foot 1824–1876 98th (The Prince of Wales's) Regiment of Foot 1876–1881	1824; Raised 1824.	1881: 2nd Battalion, The Prince of Wales's (North Staffordshire Regiment)	Mercian Regiment
99	99th Regiment of Foot 1760–1763	1760; Raised 1760. Disbanded 1763.		
99	99th Regiment of Foot (Jamaica Regiment) 1780–1783	1779; Raised 1780, disbanded 1783.		
99	99th Regiment of Foot 1794–1798	1794; Raised 1794, disbanded 1798.		
99	99th (Prince of Wales's Tipperary) Regiment of Foot 1804–1816	1804; Raised 1804 as 99th Foot, renumbered as 98th in 1816 when existing 95th Foot became Rifle Brigade without a number.		
99	99th (Prince Regent's County of Dublin) Regiment of Foot 1816–1818	1805; Raised 1804 as 100th Foot, renumbered as 99th in 1816 when existing 95th Foot became Rifle Brigade without a number. Disbanded 1818.		
99	99th (Lanarkshire) Regiment of Foot 1824–1874 99th (Duke of Edinburgh's) Regiment of Foot 1874–1881	1824; Raised 1824.	1881: 2nd Battalion, The Duke of Edinburgh's (Wiltshire Regiment)	The Rifles
100	100th (Highland) Regiment of Foot 1761–1763	1761; Raised 1761. Disbanded 1763.		
100	100th Regiment of Foot 1780–1784	1780; Raised 1780, disbanded 1784. Also known as "Loyal Lincolnshire Regiment".		
100	100th (Gordon Highlanders) Regiment of Foot 1794–1798	1794; Raised 1794, renumbered as 92nd (see above) in 1798.		
100	100th (Prince Regent's County of Dublin) Regiment of Foot 1805–1816	1804; Raised 1804 as 100th Foot, renumbered as 99th in 1816 when existing 95th Foot became Rifle Brigade without a number.		
100	100th Regiment of Foot 1816–1818	1789; Raised 1798 as New South Wales Corps. Numbered 1809 as 102nd Foot, renumbered as 100th in 1816 when existing 95th Foot became Rifle Brigade without a number. Disbanded 1818.		
100	100th (Prince of Wales's Royal Canadian) Regiment of Foot 1858–1881	1824; Raised 1858 in Canada. In 1875 was deemed successor to the 100th Foot of 1805–1816.	1881: 1st Battalion, The Prince of Wales's Leinster Regiment (Royal Canadians)	Disbanded 1922.

=== 101st–110th foot ===
Number	Titles	Date of raising or coming onto establishment	Fate	Successor 2012
101	101st (Highland) Regiment of Foot 1760–1763	1760; Raised 1760, disbanded 1763. Also known as "Johnstone's Highlanders".		
101	101st Regiment of Foot 1780–1783	1780; Raised 1780. Disbanded 1783.		
101	101st (Irish) Regiment of Foot 1794–1795	1794; Raised 1794. Disbanded 1795.		
101	101st (Duke of York's Irish) Regiment of Foot 1806–1816	1806; Raised 1806, disbanded 1816.		
101	101st Regiment of Foot (Royal Bengal Fusiliers) 1861–1881	1756; Raised 1756 by the Honorable East India Company as the Bengal European Regiment. Came under Crown control in 1858 as 1st Bengal Fusiliers. Made a "royal" regiment and integrated into the British Army as the 101st Foot in 1861.	1881:1st Battalion, The Royal Munster Fusiliers	Disbanded 1922
102	102nd (Queen's Royal Volunteers) Regiment of Foot 1760–1763	1760; Raised 1760, disbanded 1763.		
102	102nd Regiment of Foot 1780–1783	1780; Raised 1780. Disbanded 1783.		
102	102nd (Irish) Regiment of Foot 1794–1795	1793; Raised 1793 as Trench's Regiment. Numbered 1794, disbanded 1795. Also known as "Irish Rangers".		
102	102nd Regiment of Foot 1809–1816	1789; Raised 1789 as New South Wales Corps. Numbered 1809 as 102nd Foot, renumbered as 100th (see above) in 1816 when existing 95th Foot became Rifle Brigade without a number.		
102	102nd Regiment of Foot (Royal Madras Fusiliers) 1861–1881	1756; Raised 1742 by the Honorable East India Company as the Madras European Regiment. Came under Crown control in 1858 as 1st Madras Fusiliers. Made a "royal" regiment and integrated into the British Army as the 102nd Foot in 1861.	1881:1st Battalion, The Royal Dublin Fusiliers	Disbanded 1922
103	103rd (Volunteer Hunters) Regiment of Foot 1761–1763	1761; Raised 1761, disbanded 1763.		
103	103rd (King's Irish Infantry) Regiment of Foot 1781–1783	1781; Raised 1780. Disbanded 1783.		
103	103rd (Loyal Bristol Volunteers) Regiment of Foot 1794–1795	1794; Raised 1794 as Loyal Bristol Regiment. Numbered 1794, disbanded 1795.		
103	103rd Regiment of Foot 1809–1816	1809; Formed from the 9th Garrison Battalion (raised 1806). Disbanded 1816.		
103	103rd Regiment of Foot (Royal Bombay Fusiliers) 1861–1881	1661; Raised 1661 as the Bombay Regiment. Under the control of the Honorable East India Company from 1668. Came under Crown control in 1858 as 1st Bombay Fusiliers. Made a "royal" regiment and integrated into the British Army as the 103rd Foot in 1861.	1881:2nd Battalion, The Royal Dublin Fusiliers	Disbanded 1922
104	104th (King's Volunteers) Regiment of Foot 1761–1763	1761; Raised 1761, disbanded 1763.		
104	104th Regiment of Foot (1782) 1782–1783	1780; Formed from 10 independent companies raised earlier. Disbanded 1783, after a mutiny.		
104	104th (Royal Manchester Volunteers) Regiment of Foot 1794–1795	1794; Raised 1794, disbanded 1795.		
104	104th Regiment of Foot (New Brunswick Regiment) 1809–1816	1811; Created from New Brunswick Fencible Infantry (raised 1803). Disbanded 1817.		
104	104th Regiment of Foot (Bengal Fusiliers) 1861–1881	1839; Raised 1839 as the 2nd Bengal (European) Light Infantry. Came under Crown control in 1858 as 2nd Bengal Fusiliers. Integrated into the British Army as the 104th Foot in 1861.	1881:2nd Battalion, The Royal Munster Fusiliers	Disbanded 1922
105	105th (Queen's Own Royal Highlanders) Regiment of Foot 1761–1763	1761; Raised 1761, disbanded 1763.		
105	105th (Volunteers of Ireland) Regiment of Foot 1781–1783	1781; Raised 1777 in North America. Brought onto British Establishment as 105th Foot in 1781/2. Disbanded 1783.		
105	105th Regiment of Foot 1794–1796	1794; Raised 1794, disbanded 1796.		
105	105th Regiment of Foot (Madras Light Infantry) 1861–1881	1839; Raised 1839 as the 2nd Madras (European) Light Infantry. Came under Crown control in 1858 as 2nd Madras Light Infantry. Integrated into the British Army as the 105th Foot in 1861.	1881:2nd Battalion, The King's Own (Yorkshire Light Infantry)	The Rifles
106	106th Regiment of Foot 1761–1763	1761; Raised 1761, disbanded 1763. Known as "Black Musketeers".		
106	106th Regiment of Foot 1794–1795	1794; Raised 1794, disbanded 1795.		
106	106th Regiment of Foot (Bombay Light Infantry) 1861–1881	1839; Raised 1839 as the 2nd Bombay (European) Regiment. Came under Crown control in 1858 as 2nd Bombay Light Infantry. Integrated into the British Army as the 106th Foot in 1861.	1881:2nd Battalion, The Durham Light Infantry	The Rifles
107	107th Regiment of Foot (Queen's Own Royal Regiment of British Volunteers) 1761–1763	1761; Raised 1761. Disbanded 1763.		
107	107th Regiment of Foot 1794–1795	1794; Raised 1794. Disbanded 1795.		
107	107th Regiment of Foot (Bengal Light Infantry) 1861–1881	1854; Raised 1854 as the 3rd Bengal (European) Light Infantry. Came under Crown control in 1858 as 3rd Bengal Light Infantry. Integrated into the British Army as the 107th Foot in 1861.	1881:2nd Battalion, The Royal Sussex Regiment	Princess of Wales's Royal Regiment
108	108th Regiment of Foot 1760–1763	1760; Raised 1760. Disbanded 1763.		
108	108th Regiment of Foot 1794–1796	1794; Raised 1794. Disbanded 1796.		
108	108th Regiment of Foot (Madras Infantry) 1861–1881	1854; Raised 1854 as the 3rd Madras (European) Infantry. Came under Crown control in 1858 as 3rd Madras Infantry. Integrated into the British Army as the 108th Foot in 1861.	1881:2nd Battalion, The Royal Inniskilling Fusiliers	Royal Irish Regiment
109	109th Regiment of Foot (1761) 1761–1763	1761; Raised 1761. Disbanded 1763.		
109	109th (Aberdeenshire) Regiment of Foot 1794–1795	1794; Raised 1794. Disbanded 1795.		
109	109th Regiment of Foot (Bombay Infantry) 1861–1881	1853; Raised 1853 as the 3rd Bombay (European) Regiment. Came under Crown control in 1858 as 3rd Bombay Regiment. Integrated into the British Army as the 109th Foot in 1861.	1881:2nd Battalion, The Prince of Wales's Leinster Regiment (Royal Canadians)	Disbanded 1922
110	110th Regiment of Foot (Queen's Own Musketeers) 1761–1763	1761; Raised 1761. Disbanded 1763.		
110	110th Regiment of Foot 1794–1795	1794; Raised 1794, disbanded 1795.		

=== 111th–120th foot ===
Number	Titles	Date of raising or coming onto establishment
111	111th Regiment of Foot 1761–1763	1761; Raised 1761. Disbanded 1763.
111	111th Regiment of Foot (Loyal Birmingham Volunteers) 1794–1795	1794; Raised 1794. Disbanded 1795.
112	112th Regiment of Foot (King's Royal Musketeers) 1761–1763	1761; Raised 1761. Disbanded 1763.
112	112th Regiment of Foot 1794–1795	1794; Raised 1794. Disbanded 1795.
113	113th Regiment of Foot (Royal Highlanders) 1761–1763	1761; Raised 1761. Disbanded 1763.
113	113th Regiment of Foot 1794–1795	1794; Raised 1794. Disbanded 1795.
114	114th Regiment of Foot (Royal Highland Volunteers) 1761–1763	1761; Raised 1761. Disbanded 1763.
114	114th Regiment of Foot 1794–1795	1794; Raised 1794. Disbanded 1795.
115	115th Regiment of Foot (Royal Scotch Lowlanders) 1761–1763	1761; Raised 1761. Disbanded 1763.
115	115th Regiment of Foot (Prince William's) 1794–1795	1794; Raised 1794. Disbanded 1795.
116	116th (Invalids) Regiment of Foot 1762–1763	1762; Raised 1762. Renumbered as 73rd foot (see above) 1763
116	116th (Perthshire Highlanders) Regiment of Foot 1793–1795	1793; Raised 1793. Disbanded 1795.
117	117th (Invalids) Regiment of Foot 1762–1763	1762; Raised 1762. Renumbered as 74th foot (see above) 1763
117	117th Regiment of Foot 1793–1795	1793; Raised 1794. Disbanded 1796.
118	118th (Invalids) Regiment of Foot 1762–1763	1762; Raised 1762. Renumbered as 75th foot (see above) 1763
118	118th Regiment of Foot 1794–1795	1794; Raised 1794. Disbanded 1795.
119	119th (The Prince's Own) Regiment of Foot 1761–1763	1761; Raised 1762. Disbanded 1763.
119	119th Regiment of Foot 1794–1796	1794; Raised 1794 as John Rochfort's Regiment of Foot. Disbanded 1795.
120	120th Regiment of Foot 1762–1763	1762; Raised 1762. Disbanded 1763.
120	120th Regiment of Foot 1794–1795	1794; Raised 1794. Disbanded 1795.

=== 121st–130th Foot ===
Number	Titles	Date of raising or coming onto establishment
121	121st Regiment of Foot 1761–1763	1761; Raised 1761. Disbanded 1763.
121	121st Regiment of Foot 1794–1795	1794; Raised 1794. Disbanded 1795.
122	122nd Regiment of Foot 1762–1764	1762; Raised 1762. Disbanded 1764.
122	122nd Regiment of Foot 1794–1796	1794; Raised 1794. Disbanded 1796.
123	123rd Regiment of Foot 1762–1764	1762; Raised 1762. Disbanded 1764.
123	123rd Regiment of Foot 1794–1796	1794; Raised 1794. Disbanded 1796.
124	124th Regiment of Foot 1762–1763	1762; Raised 1762. Disbanded 1763.
124	124th (Waterford) Regiment of Foot 1794–1795	1794; Raised 1794. Disbanded 1795.
125	125th Regiment of Foot 1794–1795	1794; Raised 1794. Disbanded 1795.
126	126th Regiment of Foot 1794–1796	1794; Raised 1794. Disbanded 1796.
127	127th Regiment of Foot 1794–1796	1794; Raised 1794. Disbanded 1796.
128	128th Regiment of Foot 1794–1796	1794; Raised 1794. Disbanded 1796.
129	129th Regiment of Foot 1794–1796	1794; Raised 1794 as the Gentlemen of Coventry's Regiment of Foot. Disbanded 1796.
130	130th Regiment of Foot 1794–1796	1794; Raised 1794. Disbanded 1796.

=== 131st–135th foot ===
Number	Titles	Date of raising or coming onto establishment
131	131st Regiment of Foot 1794–1796	1794; Raised 1794. Disbanded 1796.
132	132nd (Highland) Regiment of Foot 1794–1796	1794; Raised 1794. Disbanded 1796.
133	133rd (Highland) Regiment of Foot (Inverness Volunteers) 1794–1796	1794; Raised 1794. Disbanded 1796.
134	134th (Loyal Limerick) Regiment of Foot 1794–1796	1794; Raised 1794 as the 2nd Battalion of the 83rd Regiment of Foot. Disbanded 1796.
135	135th (Limerick) Regiment of Foot 1796	1794; Raised and disbanded 1796.

== See also ==
- British Army order of precedence
