= 124th Regiment =

124th Regiment may refer to:

- 124th Regiment of Foot (disambiguation), British Army regiments
- 124th Duchess of Connaught's Own Baluchistan Infantry, British Indian Army
- 124th Cavalry Regiment, United States Army
- 124th Infantry Regiment (United States)

== American Civil War regiments ==
- 124th Illinois Infantry Regiment
- 124th Indiana Infantry Regiment
- 124th New York Infantry Regiment
- 124th Ohio Infantry Regiment
- 124th Pennsylvania Infantry Regiment

== See also ==
- 124th Brigade (disambiguation)
- 124th Division (disambiguation)
- 124th (disambiguation)
