= 123rd Regiment =

123rd Regiment may refer to:

- 123rd Regiment of Foot (disambiguation), British regiments
- 123rd Aviation Regiment, United States
- 123rd Field Artillery Regiment, United States
- 123rd Infantry Regiment (United States)
- 123rd Infantry Regiment "Chieti", Italy
- 123rd Light Anti-Aircraft Regiment, Royal Artillery
- 123rd Outram's Rifles, British Indian Army

== American Civil War regiments ==
- 123rd Illinois Infantry Regiment
- 123rd Indiana Infantry Regiment
- 123rd New York Infantry Regiment
- 123rd Ohio Infantry Regiment
- 123rd Pennsylvania Infantry Regiment

== See also ==
- 123rd Brigade (disambiguation)
- 123rd Division (disambiguation)
- 123rd (disambiguation)
