= 122nd Regiment =

122nd Regiment may refer to:

- 122nd Cavalry Regiment, United States
- 122nd Field Artillery Regiment, United States
- 122nd Field Regiment, Royal Artillery
- 122nd Fusilier Regiment (Württemberg)
- 122nd Infantry Regiment (United States)
- 122nd (Royal Warwickshire Regiment) Light Anti-Aircraft/Anti-Tank Regiment, Royal Artillery
- 122nd Regiment (XPCC)
- 122nd Regiment of Foot (disambiguation), British regiments

== American Civil War regiments ==
- 122nd Illinois Infantry Regiment
- 122nd Indiana Infantry Regiment
- 122nd New York Infantry Regiment
- 122nd Ohio Infantry Regiment
- 122nd United States Colored Infantry Regiment

== See also ==
- 122nd Brigade (disambiguation)
- 122nd Division (disambiguation)
- 122nd (disambiguation)
