= 114th Regiment =

114th Regiment may refer to:

- 114th Regiment of Foot (disambiguation), British Army regiments
- 114th Infantry Regiment (United States)
- 114th Infantry Regiment "Mantova"
- 114th Aviation Regiment
- 114th Field Artillery Regiment
- 114th Light Anti-Aircraft Regiment, Royal Artillery
- 114th (Sussex) Field Regiment, Royal Artillery

== American Civil War regiments ==
- 114th Illinois Infantry Regiment
- 114th New York Infantry Regiment
- 114th Ohio Infantry Regiment
- 114th Pennsylvania Infantry Regiment
- 114th United States Colored Infantry Regiment

== See also ==
- 114th Brigade (disambiguation)
- 114th Division (disambiguation)
