= 113th Regiment =

113th Regiment may refer to:

- 113th Regiment of Foot (disambiguation), British Army regiments
- 113th Cavalry Regiment
- 113th Field Artillery Regiment
- 113th Infantry Regiment (Russian Empire)
- 113th Infantry Regiment (United States)
- 116th Fighter Aviation Regiment
- 113th Heavy Anti-Aircraft Regiment, Royal Artillery
- 113th (Durham Light Infantry) Light Anti-Aircraft Regiment, Royal Artillery
- 113th (Home Counties) Field Regiment, Royal Artillery

== American Civil War regiments ==
- 113th Illinois Volunteer Infantry
- 113th Ohio Infantry Regiment
- 113th United States Colored Infantry Regiment

== See also ==
- 113th Brigade (disambiguation)
- 113th Division (disambiguation)
