= 109th Regiment =

109th Regiment may refer to:

- 109th Regiment of Foot (disambiguation), British Army regiments
- 109th Infantry Regiment (United States)
- 109th Field Artillery Regiment
- 109th Regiment Royal Armoured Corps
- 109th Bomber Aviation Regiment
- 109th Field Regiment, Royal Artillery
- 109th (Royal Sussex Regiment) Light Anti-Aircraft Regiment, Royal Artillery

== American Civil War regiments ==
- 109th Illinois Infantry Regiment
- 109th New York Infantry Regiment
- 109th Pennsylvania Infantry Regiment

== See also ==
- 109th Brigade (disambiguation)
- 109th Division (disambiguation)
