= 116th Regiment =

116th Regiment may refer to:

- 116th Regiment of Foot (disambiguation), British Army regiments
- 116th Infantry Regiment (United States)
- 116th Mahrattas
- 116th Field Artillery Regiment
- 116th Light Anti-Aircraft Regiment, Royal Artillery
- 116th Fighter Aviation Regiment
- 116th Operational Maneuvers Regiment

== American Civil War regiments ==
- 116th Illinois Infantry Regiment
- 116th Indiana Infantry Regiment
- 116th New York Infantry Regiment
- 116th Ohio Infantry Regiment
- 116th Pennsylvania Infantry Regiment
- 116th United States Colored Infantry Regiment

== See also ==
- 116th Brigade (disambiguation)
- 116th Division (disambiguation)
