= 112th Regiment =

112th Regiment may refer to:

- 112th Regiment of Foot (disambiguation), British Army regiments
- 112th Infantry Regiment (United States)
- 112th Aviation Regiment
- 112th Cavalry Regiment
- 112th Field Artillery Regiment
- 112th Regiment Royal Armoured Corps
- 112th (Durham Light Infantry) Light Anti-Aircraft Regiment, Royal Artillery
- 112th (Wessex) Field Regiment, Royal Artillery
- 112th Field Regiment, Royal Artillery

== American Civil War regiments ==
- 112th Illinois Infantry Regiment
- 112th New York Infantry Regiment
- 112th United States Colored Infantry Regiment

== See also ==
- 112th Brigade (disambiguation)
- 112th Division (disambiguation)
