= 115th Regiment =

115th Regiment may refer to:

- 115th Regiment of Foot (disambiguation), British Army regiments
- 115th Infantry Regiment (Imperial Japanese Army)
- 115th Infantry Regiment (United States)
- 115th (North Midland) Field Regiment, Royal Artillery
- 115th Light Anti-Aircraft Regiment, Royal Artillery

== American Civil War regiments ==
- 115th Indiana Infantry Regiment
- 115th Illinois Infantry Regiment
- 115th New York Infantry Regiment
- 115th Ohio Infantry Regiment
- 115th Pennsylvania Infantry Regiment

== See also ==
- 115th Brigade (disambiguation)
- 115th Division (disambiguation)
