= 116th =

116th is the ordinal form of the number 116. 116th or One hundred and [spell out] may also refer to:

- A fraction, 1/116, equal to one of 116 equal parts

== Geography ==
- 116th meridian east, a line of longitude
- 116th meridian west, a line of longitude
- 116th Street (disambiguation)

== Military ==
- 116th Brigade (disambiguation)
- 116th Division (disambiguation)
- 116th Regiment (disambiguation)

== See also ==
- April 26, 116th day of the year in a standard year
