= 124 =

124 may refer to:

- 124 (number), the natural number following 123 and preceding 125
- AD 124, a year in the 2nd century AD
- 124 BC, a year in the 2nd century BC
- 124 (New Jersey bus)
- 124 (turbojet), a small turbojet engine notable for its use of a supersonic axial-flow compressor
- "124", a song by Photek from their album Modus Operandi
- 124, the name of the house that forms the setting of Toni Morrison's 1987 narrative Beloved (novel)
- 124 Alkeste, a main-belt asteroid
- Fiat 124, a small family car
  - Fiat 124 Sport Coupé, a sports coupé
  - Fiat 124 Sport Spider, a sports roadster
  - SEAT 124, a derivative of the Fiat 124
    - SEAT 124 Sport, a coupé version of the SEAT 124

== See also ==
- 124th (disambiguation)
- Unbiquadium, a hypothetical chemical element with atomic number 124
