= 107th =

107th is the ordinal form of the number 107. 107th or One hundred and seventh may also refer to:

- A fraction, 1/107, equal to one of 107 equal parts

== Geography ==
- 107th meridian east, a line of longitude
- 107th meridian west, a line of longitude

== Military ==
- 107th Brigade (disambiguation)
- 107th Division (disambiguation)
- 107th Regiment (disambiguation)

== See also ==
- April 17, 107th day of the year in a standard year
