= 118th =

118th is the ordinal form of the number 118. 118th or One hundred and [spell out] may also refer to:

- A fraction, 1/118, equal to one of 118 equal parts

== Geography ==
- 118th meridian east, a line of longitude
- 118th meridian west, a line of longitude

== Military ==
- 118th Brigade (disambiguation)
- 118th Division (disambiguation)
- 118th Regiment (disambiguation)

== See also ==
- April 28, 118th day of the year in a standard year
