= 121st Regiment of Foot =

Two regiments of the British Army have been numbered the 121st Regiment of Foot:

- 121st Regiment of Foot (1762), raised in 1762
- 121st Regiment of Foot (1794), raised in 1794
