= 107th Division =

In military terms, 107th Division or 107th Infantry Division may refer to:

- 107th Anti-Aircraft Artillery Division of Air Force, People's Republic of China
- 107th Infantry Division (German Empire)
- 107th Division (Imperial Japanese Army)
- 107th Guards Airborne Division, Soviet Union, earlier the 107th Guards Rifle Division
- 107th Motor Rifle Division, Soviet Union
- 107th Rifle Division, Soviet Union, World War II
- 107th Tank Division, Soviet Union, World War II
- 107th Infantry Division (United States), planned but never established

== See also ==
- List of military divisions by number
- 107th Brigade (disambiguation)
- 107th Regiment (disambiguation)
- 107th Squadron (disambiguation)
- 107th (disambiguation)
