= 114th =

114th is the ordinal form of the number 114. 114th or One hundred and [spell out] may also refer to:

- A fraction, 1/114, equal to one of 114 equal parts

== Geography ==
- 114th meridian east, a line of longitude
- 114th meridian west, a line of longitude

== Military ==
- 114th Brigade (disambiguation)
- 114th Division (disambiguation)
- 114th Regiment (disambiguation)

== See also ==
- April 24, 114th day of the year in a standard year
