= 112th Regiment of Foot =

Two regiments of the British Army have been numbered the 112th Regiment of Foot:

- 112th Regiment of Foot (King's Royal Musqueteers), raised in 1761
- 112th Regiment of Foot (1794), raised in 1794
