= 115th =

115th is the ordinal form of the number 115. 115th or One hundred and [spell out] may also refer to:

- A fraction, 1/115, equal to one of 115 equal parts

== Geography ==
- 115th meridian east, a line of longitude
- 115th meridian west, a line of longitude

== Military ==
- 115th Brigade (disambiguation)
- 115th Division (disambiguation)
- 115th Regiment (disambiguation)

== See also ==
- April 25, 115th day of the year in a standard year
