= 116th Regiment of Foot =

Two regiments of the British Army have been numbered the 116th Regiment of Foot:

- 116th Regiment of Foot (Invalids), raised in 1762 and renumbered as the 73rd in 1763
- 116th (Perthshire Highlanders) Regiment of Foot, raised in 1793
