= 123rd Regiment of Foot =

Two regiments of the British Army have been numbered the 123rd Regiment of Foot:

- 123rd Regiment of Foot (1762), raised in 1762
- 123rd Regiment of Foot (Loyal Lincolnshire), raised in 1794
