= 109th =

109th is the ordinal form of the number 109. 109th or One hundred and ninth may also refer to:

- A fraction, 1/109, equal to one of 109 equal parts

== Geography ==
- 109th meridian east, a line of longitude
- 109th meridian west, a line of longitude

== Military ==
- 109th Brigade (disambiguation)
- 109th Division (disambiguation)
- 109th Regiment (disambiguation)

== See also ==
- April 19, 109th day of the year in a standard year
