= 122nd Regiment of Foot =

Two regiments of the British Army have been numbered the 122nd Regiment of Foot:

- 122nd Regiment of Foot (1762), raised in 1762
- 122nd Regiment of Foot (1794), raised in 1794
