= 112th Infantry =

112th Infantry may refer to:

- 112th Infantry (British India), a regiment
- 112th Infantry Regiment (disambiguation)
- 112th Infantry Brigade (disambiguation)
- 112th Infantry Division (disambiguation)

== See also ==
- 112th (disambiguation)
