= 124th Regiment of Foot =

Two regiments of the British Army have been numbered the 124th Regiment of Foot:

- 124th Regiment of Foot (1762), raised in 1762
- 124th (Waterford) Regiment of Foot, raised in 1794
