= 113th =

113th is the ordinal form of the number 113. 113th or One hundred and [spell out] may also refer to:

- A fraction, 1/113, equal to one of 113 equal parts

== Geography ==
- 113th meridian east, a line of longitude
- 113th meridian west, a line of longitude

== Military ==
- 113th Brigade (disambiguation)
- 113th Division (disambiguation)
- 113th Regiment (disambiguation)

== See also ==
- April 23, 113th day of the year in a standard year
