= 109th Regiment of Foot =

Three regiments of the British Army have been numbered the 109th Regiment of Foot:

- 109th Regiment of Foot, raised in 1761
- 109th (Aberdeenshire) Regiment of Foot, raised in 1794
- 109th Regiment of Foot (Bombay Infantry), raised by the East India Company and placed on the British establishment as the 109th Foot in 1862
