= 122 =

122 may refer to:

- 122 (number), the natural number following 121 and preceding 123
- AD 122, a year in the 2nd century AD
- 122 BC, a year in the 2nd century BC
- 122 (film), a 2019 Egyptian psychological horror film
- "One Twenty Two", a 2022 single by the American rock band Botch
- 122 Gerda, a main-belt asteroid

12/2 may refer to:

- December 2 (month-day date notation)
- February 12 (day-month date notation)
- 12 shillings and 2 pence in UK predecimal currency

== See also ==
- 122nd (disambiguation)
- 2/12 (disambiguation)
- Unbibium, a hypothetical chemical element with atomic number 122
