= 118th Regiment of Foot =

Three regiments of the British Army have been numbered the 118th Regiment of Foot:

- 118th Regiment of Foot formed in 1761 by the regimentation of independent companies and disbanded in 1762.
- 118th Regiment of Foot (1794), an infantry regiment formed in 1794
- The 118th Regiment of Foot (Invalids) formed in 1762, renumbered as the 75th the following year and disbanded in 1768 or 1769.
