= 114th Division =

In military terms, 114th Division or 114th Infantry Division may refer to:

== Infantry divisions ==
- 114th Division (People's Republic of China), currently a unit of the People's Armed Police
- 114th Jäger Division, German Army
- 114th Division (Imperial Japanese Army)
- 114th Guards Motor Rifle Division, Soviet Union
- 114th Guards Rifle Division, Soviet Union, previously the 114th Guards Airborne Division
- 114th Rifle Division, Soviet Union

== Cavalry divisions ==
- 114th Cavalry Division, Soviet Union

== See also ==
- List of military divisions by number
- 114th Brigade (disambiguation)
- 114th Regiment (disambiguation)
- 114th Squadron (disambiguation)
- 114th (disambiguation)
