= 107th Rocket Brigade =

107th Rocket Brigade may refer to:

- 107th Rocket Brigade (Soviet Union), now the 107th Rocket Artillery Brigade of Ukraine
- 107th Rocket Brigade (Russia)

== See also ==
- 107th Brigade (disambiguation)
