= 109th Division =

In military terms, 109th Division or 109th Infantry Division may refer to:

- 109th Division (People's Republic of China)
- 109th Infantry Division (German Empire)
- 109th Division (Imperial Japanese Army)
- 109th Guards Rifle Division, Soviet Union
- 109th Motorized Division, Soviet Union
- 109th Rifle Division, Soviet Union

== See also ==
- List of military divisions by number
- 109th Brigade (disambiguation)
- 109th Regiment (disambiguation)
- 109th Squadron (disambiguation)
- 109th (disambiguation)
