= 113th Regiment of Foot =

Two regiments of the British Army have been numbered the 113th Regiment of Foot:

- 113th Regiment of Foot (Royal Highlanders), raised in 1761
- 113th Regiment of Foot (1794), raised in 1794
