= 112th =

112th is the ordinal form of the number 112. 112th or One hundred and twelfth may also refer to:

- A fraction, 1/112, equal to one of 112 equal parts

== Geography ==
- 112th meridian east, a line of longitude
- 112th meridian west, a line of longitude

== Military ==
- 112th Brigade (disambiguation)
- 112th Division (disambiguation)
- 112th Regiment (disambiguation)

== See also ==
- April 22, 112th day of the year in a standard year
