= 115th Regiment of Foot =

Two regiments of the British Army have been numbered the 115th Regiment of Foot:

- 115th Regiment of Foot (Royal Scotch Lowlanders), raised in 1761
- 115th Regiment of Foot (Prince William's), raised in 1794
