= 118th Division =

In military terms, 118th Division or 118th Infantry Division may refer to:

- 118th Division (People's Republic of China)
- 118th Jäger Division, Wehrmacht, Germany
- 118th Division (Imperial Japanese Army)
- 118th Guards Rifle Division, Soviet Union
- 118th Rifle Division, Soviet Union

== See also ==
- List of military divisions by number
- 118th Brigade (disambiguation)
- 118th Regiment (disambiguation)
- 118th Squadron (disambiguation)
- 118th (disambiguation)
