= 118th Brigade =

118th Brigade may refer to:

== China ==
- 118th Mechanized Infantry Brigade (People's Republic of China)

== Spain ==
- 118th Mixed Brigade

== Ukraine ==
- 118th Mechanized Brigade (Ukraine), a regular Ukrainian army unit
- 118th Territorial Defense Brigade, a unit of the Ukrainian Territorial Defense Forces

== United Kingdom ==
- 118th Brigade (United Kingdom)

== United States ==
- 118th Field Artillery Brigade

== See also ==
- 118th Division (disambiguation)
- 118th Regiment (disambiguation)
