= 123rd Division =

In military terms, 123rd Division or 123rd Infantry Division may refer to:

== Infantry divisions ==
- 123rd Infantry Division (German Empire)
- 123rd Infantry Division (Wehrmacht), Germany
- 123rd Division (Imperial Japanese Army)
- 123rd Rifle Division, Soviet Union
- 123rd Guards Motor Rifle Division, Soviet Union

== See also ==
- List of military divisions by number
- 123rd Brigade (disambiguation)
- 123rd Regiment (disambiguation)
- 123rd Squadron (disambiguation)
- 123rd (disambiguation)
