= 2/12 =

2/12 may refer to:

- 1/6 (number), a fraction (one sixth, 1/6)
- February 12 (month-day date notation)
- December 2 (day-month date notation)

== See also ==
- 12/2 (disambiguation)
- Schweizer SGS 2-12
