= 124th Division =

In military terms, 124th Division or 124th Infantry Division may refer to:

- 124th Division (People's Republic of China)
- 124th Division (Imperial Japanese Army)
- 124th Guards Rifle Division, Soviet Union
- 124th Rifle Division, Soviet Union

== See also ==
- List of military divisions by number
- 124th Brigade (disambiguation)
- 124th Regiment (disambiguation)
- 124th Squadron (disambiguation)
- 124th (disambiguation)
