= 124th =

124th may refer to:

- 124th (Waterford) Regiment of Foot, an infantry regiment of the British Army, formed in 1794 and disbanded in 1795
- 124th Battalion (Governor General's Body Guard), CEF, a unit in the Canadian Expeditionary Force during the First World War
- 124th Delaware General Assembly, a meeting of the Delaware Senate and the Delaware House of Representatives
- 124th Division (People's Republic of China), a division deployed by the People's Republic of China. During the Korean War
- 124th Duchess of Connaught's Own Baluchistan Infantry, an infantry regiment of the British Indian Army
- 124th Fighter Squadron, unit of the Iowa Air National Guard that flies the F-16C/D Fighting Falcon
- 124th meridian east, a line of longitude 124° east of Greenwich
- 124th meridian west, a line of longitude 124° west of Greenwich
- 124th New York Volunteer Infantry Regiment, a volunteer regiment from Orange County, New York, during the American Civil War
- 124th Regiment of Foot (1762), an infantry regiment of the British Army, formed in 1762 and disbanded in 1763
- 124th Wing (124 WG), an Air National Guard composite unit located at Gowen Field Air National Guard Base, in Boise, Idaho
- Ohio 124th General Assembly, the legislative body of the state of Ohio in 2001 and 2002

== See also ==
- 124 (number)
- AD 124, the year 124 (CXXIV) of the Julian calendar
