= 122nd Division =

In military terms, 122nd Division or 122nd Infantry Division may refer to:

- 122nd Division (People's Republic of China)
- 122nd Infantry Division (France)
- 122nd Infantry Division (Wehrmacht), Germany
- 122nd Division (Imperial Japanese Army)
- 122nd Guards Motor Rifle Division, Soviet Union
- 122nd Guards Rifle Division, Soviet Union
- 122nd Rifle Division, Soviet Union

== See also ==
- List of military divisions by number
- 122nd Brigade (disambiguation)
- 122nd Regiment (disambiguation)
- 122nd Squadron (disambiguation)
- 122nd (disambiguation)
