= 123rd =

123rd may refer to:

- 123rd Battalion (Royal Grenadiers), CEF, a unit in the Canadian Expeditionary Force during the First World War
- 123rd Contingency Response Group, a unit of the 123rd Airlift Wing, Kentucky Air National Guard
- 123rd Delaware General Assembly, a meeting of the Delaware Senate and the Delaware House of Representatives
- 123rd Illinois Volunteer Infantry Regiment, an infantry regiment that served in the Union Army during the American Civil War
- 123rd IOC Session, scheduled to be held in 2011 in Durban, South Africa, to decide the host city of the 2018 Winter Olympic Games
- 123rd meridian east, a line of longitude 123° east of Greenwich
- 123rd meridian west, a line of longitude 123° west of Greenwich
- 123rd Outram's Rifles, an infantry regiment of the British Indian Army
- 123rd Regiment of Foot (1762), an infantry regiment of the British Army, formed in 1762 and disbanded in 1764
- 123rd Regiment of Foot (Loyal Lincolnshire), an infantry regiment of the British Army, formed in 1794 and disbanded in 1796
- 123rd Street station, a railroad station in Blue Island, Illinois
- Ohio 123rd General Assembly, the legislative body of the state of Ohio in 1999 and 2000
- Polish 123rd Fighter Escadrille, one of the fighter units of the Polish Army in 1939

== See also ==
- 123 (number)
- 123, the year 123 (CXXIII) of the Julian calendar
