= 114th Regiment of Foot =

Two regiments of the British Army have been numbered the 114th Regiment of Foot:

- 114th Regiment of Foot (1761), raised in 1761 and disbanded in 1763.
- 114th Regiment of Foot (1794), raised in 1794 and disbanded the following year
