= 107th Brigade =

In military terms, 107th Brigade or 107th Infantry Brigade may refer to:

== Germany ==
- 107th Panzer Brigade, a military unit of the German Wehrmacht in Summer 1944

== Russia ==
- 107th Rocket Brigade (Russia), a tactical ballistic missile brigade of the Russian Ground Forces

== Syria ==
- 107th Brigade (Syria)

== Ukraine ==
- 107th Territorial Defense Brigade (Ukraine), a unit of the Ukrainian Territorial Defense Forces
- 107th Rocket Artillery Brigade (Ukraine), a rocket artillery brigade of the Ukrainian Ground Forces

== United Kingdom ==
- 107th (Ulster) Brigade, a British Army formation during World Wars I and II, and the Cold War
- 107th Brigade, Royal Field Artillery, a British Army unit during World War I
- 107th (South Nottinghamshire Hussars Yeomanry) Brigade, Royal Field Artillery, a British Army unit after World War I

== See also ==
- 107th Rocket Brigade (disambiguation)
- 107th Division (disambiguation)
- 107th Regiment (disambiguation)
