= 107th Regiment of Foot =

Three regiments of the British Army have been numbered the 107th Regiment of Foot:

- 107th Regiment of Foot (Queen's Own Royal Regiment of British Volunteers), raised in 1761
- 107th Regiment of Foot, raised in 1794
- 107th (Bengal Infantry) Regiment of Foot, raised by the East India Company and placed on the British establishment as the 107th Foot in 1862
