= 113th Division =

In military terms, 113th Division or 113th Infantry Division may refer to:

- 113th Division (People's Republic of China)
- 113th Infantry Division (German Empire)
- 113th Infantry Division (Wehrmacht)
- 113th Guards Rifle Division, Soviet Union
- 113th Rifle Division, Soviet Union

== See also ==
- List of military divisions by number
- 113th Brigade (disambiguation)
- 113th Regiment (disambiguation)
- 113th Squadron (disambiguation)
- 113th (disambiguation)
