= 123rd Brigade =

123rd Brigade may refer to:

- 123rd Indian Infantry Brigade, British India
- 123rd Separate Guards Motor Rifle Brigade, a unit of the Russian Army, formerly part of Luhansk People's Militia
- 123rd Territorial Defense Brigade, a unit of the Ukrainian Territorial Defense Forces
- 123rd Brigade (United Kingdom), a unit of the British Army during the First World War

== See also ==
- 123rd Division (disambiguation)
- 123rd Regiment (disambiguation)
