= 107 Squadron =

No. 107 Squadron is an air force squadron in several countries:

- No. 107 Squadron RAF, formed as No. 107 Squadron Royal Flying Corps, UK, a bomber squadron in both world wars and beyond
- No. 107 Squadron RAAF, a Royal Australian Air Force maritime patrol squadron of World War II
- 107th Fighter Squadron, US, a unit of the Michigan Air National Guard, a descendant of the World War I 107th Aero Squadron and the 107th Observation Squadron
- 107 Squadron (Israel), a fighter unit
