= 122nd =

122nd may refer to:

- 122nd (Muskoka) Battalion, CEF, a unit in the Canadian Expeditionary Force during the First World War
- 122nd Airmobile Battalion (Ukraine), a Ukrainian military unit
- 122nd Delaware General Assembly, a meeting of the Delaware Senate and the Delaware House of Representatives
- 122nd Fighter Squadron, an active unit of the Louisiana Air National Guard which flies the F-15A Eagle
- 122nd meridian east, a line of longitude 122° east of Greenwich
- 122nd meridian west, a line of longitude 122° west of Greenwich
- 122nd Ohio Infantry, an infantry regiment in the Union Army during the American Civil War
- 122nd Rajputana Infantry, an infantry regiment of the British Indian Army
- 122nd Regiment of Foot (1762), an infantry regiment of the British Army, formed in 1762 and disbanded in 1764
- 122nd Regiment of Foot (1794), an infantry regiment of the British Army, formed in 1794 and disbanded in 1796
- 122nd Street (Manhattan), a cross street in the New York City borough of Manhattan running thirteen blocks from east to west
- East 122nd Avenue, a MAX light rail station in Portland, Oregon
- Ohio 122nd General Assembly, the legislative body of the state of Ohio in 1997 and 1998
- Polish 122nd Fighter Escadrille one of the fighter units of the Polish Army in 1939
