= 118th Regiment =

118th Regiment or 118th Infantry Regiment may refer to:

- 118th Regiment of Foot (disambiguation), several units of the British Army
- 29th Commando Regiment Royal Artillery
- 118th Infantry Regiment (United States)

== Union Army (American Civil War) ==
- 118th Illinois Infantry Regiment
- 118th New York Infantry Regiment
- 118th Ohio Infantry Regiment
- 118th Pennsylvania Infantry Regiment

== See also ==
- 118th Division (disambiguation)
