= 112th Division =

In military terms, 112th Division or 112th Infantry Division may refer to:

== Infantry divisions ==
- 112th Division (People's Republic of China)
- 112th Infantry Division (Wehrmacht), Germany
- 112th Division (Imperial Japanese Army)
- 112th Guards Rifle Division, Soviet Union, post-World War II
- 112th Rifle Division, Soviet Union

== Armoured divisions ==
- 112th Tank Division, Soviet Union

== See also ==
- List of military divisions by number
- 112th Brigade (disambiguation)
- 112th Regiment (disambiguation)
- 112th Squadron (disambiguation)
- 112th (disambiguation)
