= 114 Squadron =

114 Squadron or 114th Squadron may refer to:

- No. 114 Squadron RAF
- 114th Fighter Squadron (United States), a unit of the United States Air Force Oregon Air National Guard
- VF-114 (Fighter Squadron 114), a unit of the United States Navy
- Marine All-Weather Fighter Squadron 114, a unit of the United States Marine Corps
- 114th Combat Communications Squadron (United States), a unit of the United States Air Force Range Operations Squadron (ROPS) Florida Air National Guard
- 114 Squadron (Israel), the Israeli Air Force "Night Leaders" helicopter squadron
