= 115th Division =

In military terms, 115th Division or 115th Infantry Division may refer to:

- 115th Division (People's Republic of China)
- 115th Infantry Division (German Empire)
- 115th Division (Imperial Japanese Army)
- 115th Guards Motor Rifle Division, Soviet Union, post-World War II
- 115th Guards Rifle Division, Soviet Union
- 115th Rifle Division, Soviet Union

== See also ==
- List of military divisions by number
- 115th Brigade (disambiguation)
- 115th Regiment (disambiguation)
- 115th Squadron (disambiguation)
- 115th (disambiguation)
