= 109th Division (People's Republic of China) =

109th Division (1950–52)
- Active: 1950.2 - 1952.2
- Country: People's Republic of China
- Branch: People's Liberation Army
- Type: Division
- Role: Infantry
- Part of: 37th Corps
- Garrison/HQ: Hengshui, Hebei
- Engagements: Chinese Civil War, Korean War

The 109th Division (Chinese: 第109师) was created in February 1950 under the Regulation of the Redesignations of All Organizations and Units of the Army, issued by Central Military Commission on November 1, 1948, basing on the 7th Independent Division of Republic of China Army defected on September 19, 1949 during the Chinese Civil War.

The division was part of 36th Corps.

In April 1951 the division absorbed Cavalry Brigade, 37th Corps as preparation before entering Korea.

In September 1951 the division moved into Korea as a part of the People's Volunteer Army. During its deployment to Korea the division was in charge of rear guards mission and the construction of Taecheon Airfield.

In December the division returned from Korea.

In February 1952 the division was inactivated and re-organized as 2nd Construction Engineer Division(Chinese: 建筑工程第2师).
