= 75th Regiment of Foot (Invalids) =

Infantry regiment of the British Army

The 75th Regiment of Foot (Invalids) was an infantry regiment of the British Army from 1762 to 1768. It was originally raised as a regiment of invalids in June 1762, by John Lind, and numbered the 118th Foot; it was renumbered as the 75th the following year, and disbanded in 1768 or 1769.

== See also ==
- 118th Regiment of Foot
