= 77th Regiment of Foot (1745) =

- Active: 1745–1746
- Country: Kingdom of Great Britain
- Branch: British Army
- Type: Infantry
- Garrison/HQ: Chester
- Engagements: Jacobite rising of 1745

Commanders
- Colonel of the Regiment: John Leveson-Gower, 1st Earl Gower

The 77th Regiment of Foot was a regiment in the British Army from 1745 to 1746.

== History ==
In response to the Jacobite rising of 1745, the regiment was raised in Birmingham by John Leveson-Gower, 1st Earl Gower. The new regiment received the rank 77th.

By 22 October 1745, the 77th Foot was declared "half-complete" and considered ready to move three days later. The regiment was ordered to join the Chester garrison, consisting of the 73rd Foot and elements of the 27th Foot, in order to block any attempt by the Jacobites to invade North Wales or reach Ireland.

As of 3 February 1746, it mustered 737 NCOs and privates for an authorized strength of 780.

After the end of the war, the regiment was disbanded at Wolverhampton on 17 June 1746.

Most of the regiment raised by noblemen in 1745 had blue coats but the 77th had red coats.
