= 73rd Regiment of Foot (1745) =

- Active: 1745–1746
- Country: Great Britain
- Branch: British Army
- Type: Line infantry
- Garrison/HQ: Chester
- Engagements: Jacobite rising of 1745

Commanders
- Colonel of the Regiment: George Cholmondeley, 3rd Earl of Cholmondeley

The 73rd Regiment of Foot was a regiment in the British Army from 1745 to 1746.

== History ==
In response to the Jacobite rising of 1745, the regiment was raised by George Cholmondeley, 3rd Earl of Cholmondeley in Chester. The Earl of Cholmondeley's brother, James Cholmondeley, was then colonel of the 34th Regiment of Foot. The new regiment received the rank 73rd. By 4 November 1745, the 73rd Foot was declared "half-complete" and soon considered ready for active operations.

The regiment was stationed in Chester, alongside the 77th Foot and elements of the 20th and 27th Foot, to block any Jacobite attempt to invade North Wales or to reach Ireland. After the end of the war, the regiment was disbanded at Chester on 20 June 1746. Most of the regiment raised by noblemen in 1745 had blue coats and red facings but the actual uniform of the 73rd is unknown.
