= 124th Brigade =

124th Brigade may refer to:

- 124th Brigade (United Kingdom), a unit of the British Army during the First World War
- 124th Territorial Defense Brigade, a unit of the Ukrainian Territorial Defense Forces

== See also ==
- 124th Division (disambiguation)
- 124th Regiment (disambiguation)
