= 113th Infantry Division (German Empire) =

113th Infantry Division (113. Infanterie-Division)
- Active: 1915–19
- Country: German Empire
- Branch: Army
- Type: Infantry
- Size: Approx. 12,500
- Engagements: World War I: Second Battle of Champagne; Battle of Verdun; Battle of the Somme; Second Battle of the Aisne; German spring offensive; First Battle of the Somme (1918); Second Battle of the Marne; Hundred Days Offensive

The 113th Infantry Division (113. Infanterie-Division) was a formation of the Imperial German Army in World War I. The division was formed on March 25, 1915, and organized over the next several weeks. It was part of a wave of new infantry divisions formed in the spring of 1915. The division was disbanded in 1919 during the demobilization of the German Army after World War I.

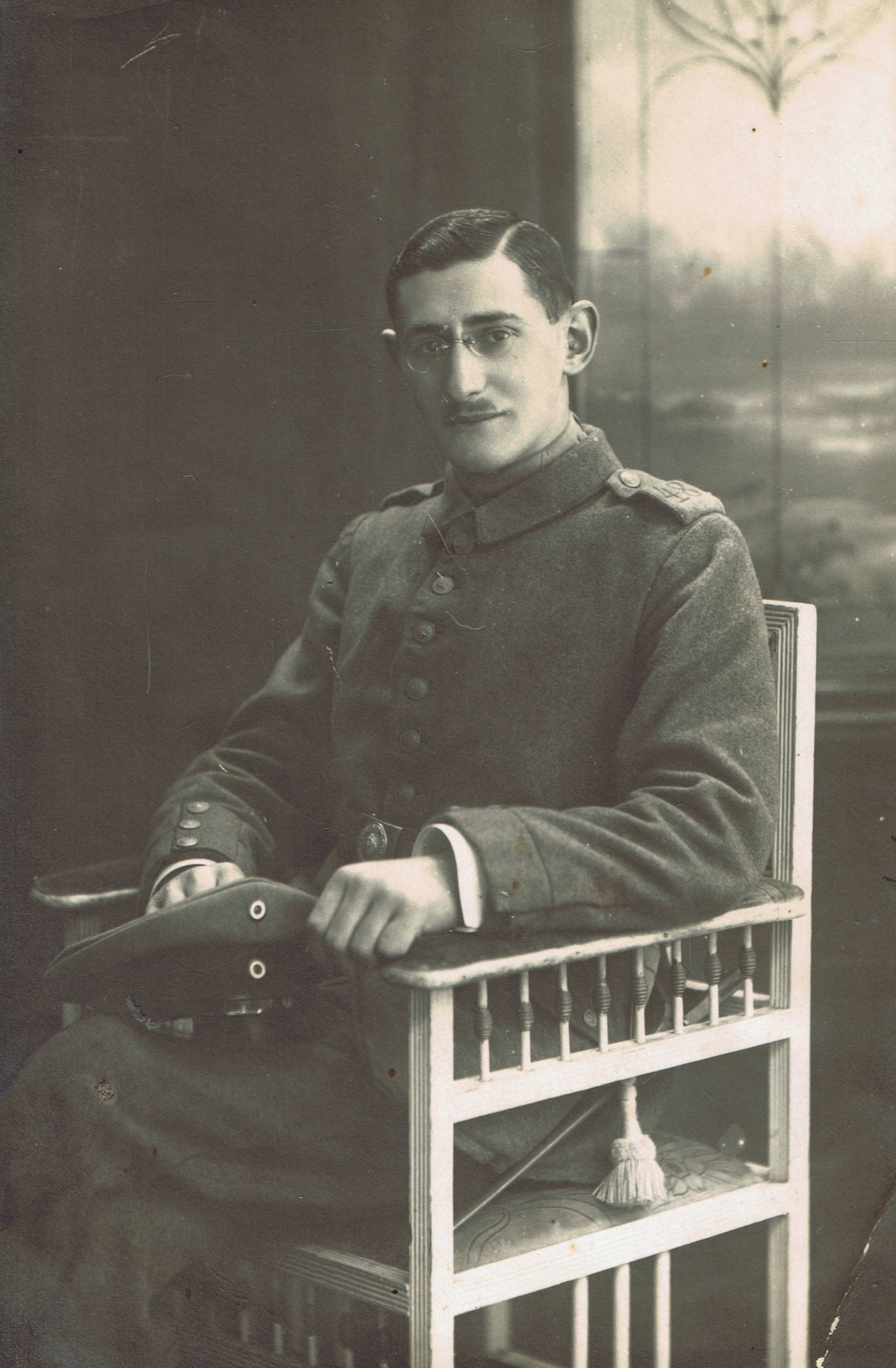
World War I Deutschen Soldaten. Infanterie-Regiment von Stülpnagel (5.Brandenburgisches) Nr.48 aus Küstrin. (1916 - Kurt Salomon).

The division was formed primarily from the excess infantry regiments of regular infantry divisions which were being triangularized. The division's 225th Infantry Brigade staff was formerly the staff of the 44th Reserve Infantry Brigade of the 22nd Reserve Division, which came to the new division along with the 32nd Reserve Infantry Regiment. The 36th Füsilier Regiment was formerly part of the 8th Infantry Division. The 48th Infantry Regiment came from the 5th Infantry Division. The 32nd Reserve Infantry Regiment was raised in the Thuringian states, primarily the Reuss principalities. The 36th Füsiliers was a "Magdeburg" regiment, raised in the Prussian Province of Saxony. The 48th Infantry was a Brandenburg regiment. The 48th Infantry was replaced by the 66th Infantry, another Magdeburg regiment, making the division primarily Prussian Saxon and Thuringian in character. Cavalry support came in the form of cuirassiers from the Rhineland. The artillery and combat engineer units were newly formed.

== Combat chronicle ==
The 113th Infantry Division fought on the Western Front in World War I, entering the line between the Meuse and Moselle in April 1915. In 1915, it saw action in the Second Battle of Champagne. In 1916, the division fought in the Battle of Verdun and the Battle of the Somme. After a period in the trenchlines in the Woëvre region and in Upper Alsace, the division fought in the Second Battle of the Aisne, also known as the Third Battle of Champagne. It then went into the line on the Chemin des Dames and north of the river Ailette, where it remained until preparing for the 1918 German spring offensive. It fought in the First Battle of the Somme (1918) and the Second Battle of the Marne, and later faced various Allied offensives collectively known as the Hundred Days Offensive. Allied intelligence rated the division as second class.

== Order of battle on formation ==
The 113th Infantry Division was formed as a triangular division. The order of battle of the division on March 25, 1915, was as follows:

- 225. Infanterie-Brigade
  - Thüringisches Reserve-Infanterie-Regiment Nr. 32
  - Füsilier-Regiment General-Feldmarschall Graf Blumenthal (1. Magdeburgisches) Nr. 36
  - Infanterie-Regiment von Stülpnagel (5. Brandenburgisches) Nr. 48
- 3.Eskadron/Kürassier-Regiment Graf Geßler (Rheinisches) Nr. 8
- 4.Eskadron/Kürassier-Regiment Graf Geßler (Rheinisches) Nr. 8
- Feldartillerie-Regiment Nr. 225
- Fußartillerie-Batterie Nr. 113
- Pionier-Kompanie Nr. 225

== Late-war order of battle ==
The division underwent relatively few organizational changes over the course of the war. In March 1917, the 48th Infantry Regiment was sent to the 228th Infantry Division and the division received the 66th Infantry Regiment from the 52nd Infantry Division. Cavalry was reduced, artillery and signals commands were formed, and combat engineer support was expanded to a full pioneer battalion. The order of battle on March 12, 1918, was as follows:

- 225.Infanterie-Brigade
  - Thüringisches Reserve-Infanterie-Regiment Nr. 32
  - Füsilier-Regiment General-Feldmarschall Graf Blumenthal (1. Magdeburgisches) Nr. 36
  - 3. Magdeburgisches Infanterie-Regiment Nr. 66
  - Maschinengewehr-Scharfschützen-Abteilung Nr. 34
- 3.Eskadron/Kürassier-Regiment Graf Geßler (Rheinisches) Nr. 8
- Artillerie-Kommandeur 113
  - Feldartillerie-Regiment Nr. 225
  - Fußartillerie-Bataillon Nr. 407
- Pionier-Bataillon Nr. 113
  - Pionier-Kompanie Nr. 225
  - Pionier-Kompanie Nr. 251
  - Minenwerfer-Kompanie Nr. 113
- Divisions-Nachrichten-Kommandeur 113
