= 116th Division =

In military terms, 116th Division or 116th Infantry Division may refer to:

- 116th Division (People's Republic of China)
- 116th Division (Imperial Japanese Army)
- 116th Panzer Division, Wehrmacht, Germany
- 116th Guards Rifle Division, Soviet Union
- 116th Rifle Division, Soviet Union

== See also ==
- List of military divisions by number
- 116th Brigade (disambiguation)
- 116th Regiment (disambiguation)
- 116th Squadron (disambiguation)
- 116th (disambiguation)
