= 116th Street =

116th Street may refer to:

== Streets ==
- 116th Street (Manhattan), a street in the New York City borough of Manhattan

== Stations ==
- 116th Street (IRT Lexington Avenue Line)
- 116th Street (IND Eighth Avenue Line)
- 116th Street (Second Avenue Subway)
- 116th Street (IRT Lenox Avenue Line)
- 116th Street (IRT Third Avenue Line)
- 116th Street (IRT Ninth Avenue Line)
- 116th Street–Columbia University (IRT Broadway–Seventh Avenue Line)
- Rockaway Park–Beach 116th Street (IND Rockaway Line); a station in New York City, in the borough of Queens

== Other ==
- 116th Street Crew, a crew in the Genovese crime family of the New York Mob from the 1960s
