= 122nd Brigade =

122nd Brigade may refer to:

- 122nd Brigade (United Kingdom), an infantry formation of the British Army in the First World War
- 122nd Brigade, Royal Field Artillery, an artillery unit of the British Army in the First World War
- 122nd Territorial Defense Brigade, a unit of the Ukrainian Territorial Defense Forces

== See also ==
- 122nd Division (disambiguation)
- 122nd Regiment (disambiguation)
