= 73rd Regiment of Foot (Invalids) =

Infantry regiment of the British Army

The 73rd Regiment of Foot (Invalids) was an infantry regiment of the British Army from 1762 to 1768.

== History ==
The regiment was originally raised as a regiment of invalids in February 1762, and numbered the 116th Foot; it was renumbered as the 73rd the following year, and disbanded in 1769.
