= 114th Brigade =

In military terms, 114th Brigade or 114th Infantry Brigade may refer to:

== British India ==
- 114th Indian Infantry Brigade

== Russia ==
- 114th Separate Guards Motor Rifle Brigade, also known as the Vostok Brigade

== Ukraine ==
- 114th Tactical Aviation Brigade
- 114th Territorial Defense Brigade, a unit of the Ukrainian Territorial Defense Forces

== United Kingdom ==
- 114th Brigade (United Kingdom), a British Army formation during World War I
- 114th Brigade, Royal Field Artillery (United Kingdom), a British Army unit during World War I

== See also ==
- 114th Division (disambiguation)
- 114th Regiment (disambiguation)
