= AD 124 =

124 in various calendars
- Gregorian calendar: 124; CXXIV
- Ab urbe condita: 877
- Assyrian calendar: 4874
- Balinese saka calendar: 45–46
- Bengali calendar: −470 – −469
- Berber calendar: 1074
- Buddhist calendar: 668
- Burmese calendar: −514
- Byzantine calendar: 5632–5633
- Chinese calendar: 癸亥年 (Water Pig); 2821 or 2614 — to — 甲子年 (Wood Rat); 2822 or 2615
- Coptic calendar: −160 – −159
- Discordian calendar: 1290
- Ethiopian calendar: 116–117
- Hebrew calendar: 3884–3885
- Hindu calendars
- Vikram Samvat: 180–181
- Shaka Samvat: 45–46
- Kali Yuga: 3224–3225
- Holocene calendar: 10124
- Iranian calendar: 498 BP – 497 BP
- Islamic calendar: 513 BH – 512 BH
- Javanese calendar: N/A
- Julian calendar: 124; CXXIV
- Korean calendar: 2457
- Minguo calendar: 1788 before ROC 民前1788年
- Nanakshahi calendar: −1344
- Seleucid era: 435/436 AG
- Thai solar calendar: 666–667
- Tibetan calendar: ཆུ་མོ་ཕག་ལོ་ (female Water-Boar); 250 or −131 or −903 — to — ཤིང་ཕོ་བྱི་བ་ལོ་ (male Wood-Rat); 251 or −130 or −902

Year 124 (CXXIV) was a leap year starting on Friday of the Julian calendar. At the time, it was known as the Year of the Consulship of Glabrio and Flaccus (or, less frequently, year 877 Ab urbe condita). The denomination 124 for this year has been used since the early medieval period, when the Anno Domini calendar era became the prevalent method in Europe for naming years.

== Events ==
=== By place ===
==== Roman Empire ====
- January 1 – Gaius Bellicius Torquatus and Manius Acilius Glabrio begin the year as the new consuls, but the two are replaced in April.
- May – Aulus Larcius Macedo, the former Governor of Galatia; and Publius Ducenius Verres take office for four month as the suffect consuls to succeed Bellicius and Glabrio, and serve until the end of August.
- September – Gaius Valerius Severus and Gaius Julius Gallus replace consuls Larcius and Ducenius and serve until the end of the year.
- Emperor Hadrian begins to rebuild the Olympeion in Athens.
- Antinous becomes Hadrian's beloved companion on his journeys through the Roman Empire.
- During a voyage to Greece, Hadrian is initiated in the ancient rites known as the Eleusinian Mysteries.

==== Asia ====
- In northern India, Nahapana, ruler of the Scythians, is defeated and dies in battle while fighting against King Gautamiputra Satakarni. This defeat destroys the Scythian dynasty of the Western Kshatrapas.

== Births ==
- Apuleius, Numidian novelist, writer, public speaker (approximate date)

== Deaths ==
- Marcus Annius Verus, father of Marcus Aurelius
- Nahapana, ruler of the Scythians (approximate date)
- Sixtus I, bishop of Rome according to Roman Catholic tradition (possible date)
