= 113th Regiment of Foot (1794) =

Infantry regiment of the British Army

The 113th Regiment of Foot was an infantry regiment of the British Army from 1794 to 1795.

It was raised in May 1794 and was disbanded in 1795.
