= 114th Regiment of Foot (1794) =

Infantry regiment of the British Army

The 114th Regiment of Foot was an infantry regiment of the British Army from 1794 to 1795. It was raised in April 1794 and disbanded the following year.
