= 115th Brigade =

115th Brigade may refer to:

== China ==
- 115th Mechanized Infantry Brigade (People's Republic of China)

== India ==
- 115th Indian Infantry Brigade

== Ukraine ==
- 115th Mechanized Brigade (Ukraine)
- 115th Territorial Defense Brigade

== United Kingdom ==
- 115th Brigade (United Kingdom)

== United States ==
- 115th Field Artillery Brigade

== See also ==
- 115th Brigade Support Battalion, United States
- 115th Division (disambiguation)
- 115th Regiment (disambiguation)
