= 112th Regiment of Foot (1794) =

Infantry regiment of the British Army

The 112th Regiment of Foot was an infantry regiment of the British Army from 1794 to 1795. It was raised in July 1794 and stationed in Ireland.

In 1795 it was to be posted to the Caribbean to take part in a British invasion of Saint-Domingue. The invasion had already suffered heavy losses to yellow fever. On hearing of the plan, soldiers of the regiment rioted.

The regiment was disbanded in 1795.

== Sources ==
- Perry, James (2005). Arrogant Armies: Great Military Disasters and the Generals Behind Them. Edison: Castle Books.
