= 121st Regiment of Foot (1794) =

Infantry regiment of the British Army

The 121st Regiment of Foot was an infantry regiment of the British Army, formed in 1794 (231 years ago) and disbanded in 1796 (229 years ago).
