= 109th (Aberdeenshire) Regiment of Foot =

- Active: 1794–1795
- Country: United Kingdom
- Branch: Army
- Type: Line Infantry
- Role: Infantry
- Size: One battalion

Commanders
- Notable commanders: Alexander Leith Hay

The 109th (Aberdeenshire) Regiment of Foot was an infantry regiment of the British Army from 1794 to 1795. Raised by Alexander Leith Hay for service in the French Revolutionary Wars the regiment was briefly deployed in Jersey before it was disbanded in England and its men sent to reinforce the 53rd (Shropshire) Regiment of Foot. The disbandment was controversial as Leith-Hay believed it contravened an assurance given to him in his original letter of service to raise the regiment.

== Establishment ==
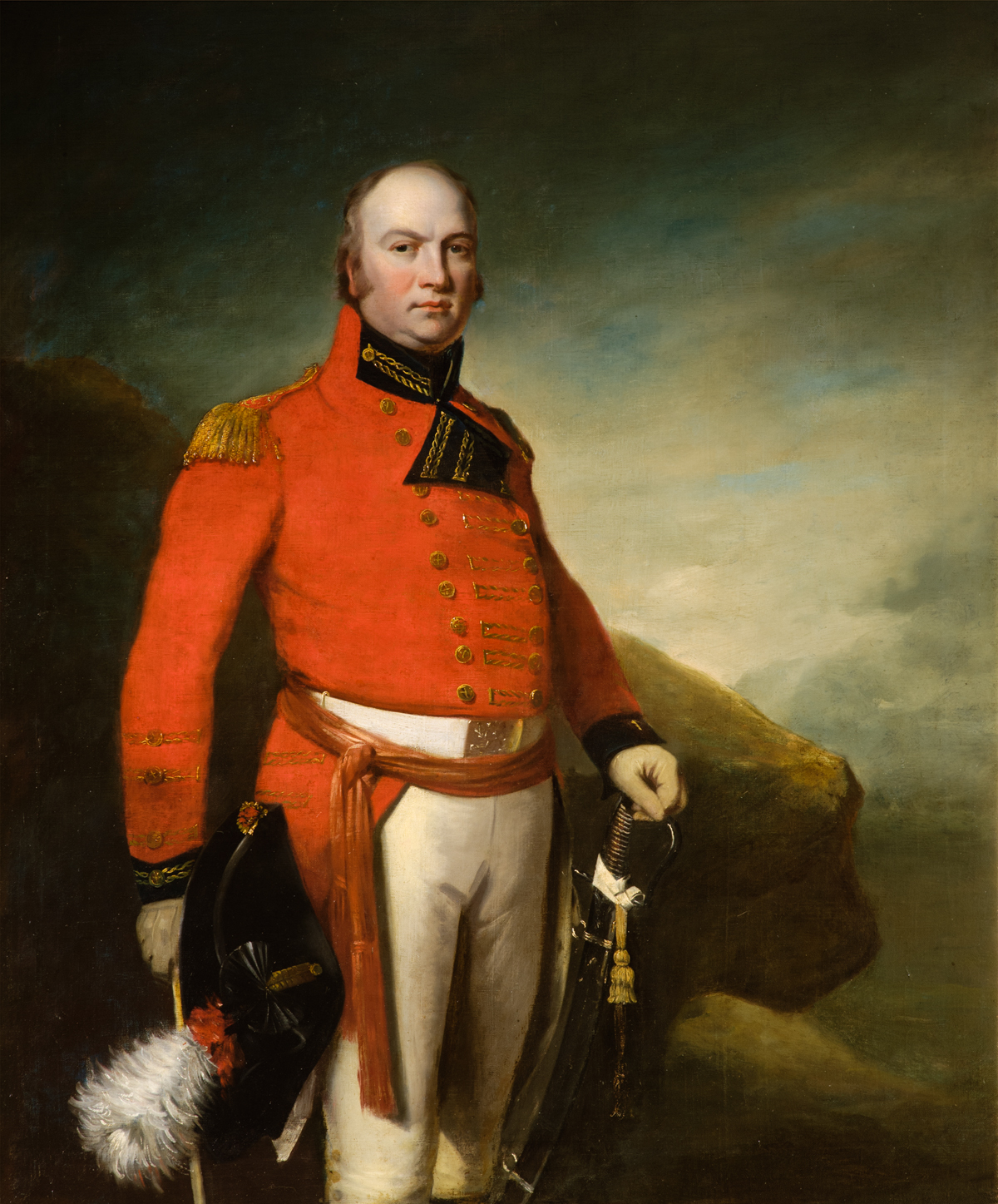
Alexander Leith-Hay, founder of the regiment, pictured later in his career as a general

The 109th was one of fifty-eight regiments of foot raised in 1793–95 as part of a recruiting drive. The majority of these units had a short and uneventful existence as it was decided in 1795 to "reduce" all regiments numbered above 100, and to draft their members into existing senior regiments.

The establishment of the regiment had been proposed to the House of Commons committee of supply on 19 November 1793 by Major-General Richard FitzPatrick on behalf of Alexander Hay. Alexander was known as "Sandie" Leith-Hay after inheriting Leith Hall from his brother, and later taking on the additional titles of Hay of Rannes to honour his great uncle Andrew Hay, a renowned jacobite in the 1745 rising. He was a regular army soldier who had been commissioned lieutenant upon his birth and promoted to captain in the 7th Dragoons at the age of ten, as well as a noted laird in Aberdeenshire. On 8 March 1794 Leith-Hay wrote to Sir George Yonge, 5th Baronet, Secretary of State for War, to remind him of his offer to recruit soldiers to fight in the French Revolutionary Wars, and he was granted a letter of service to raise the regiment on 2 April 1794.

The regiment was raised on 17 May 1794 in Aberdeenshire, and was initially known as "Hay's" or the Aberdeenshire Regiment. Leith-Hay was reported to have offered between 20 and 25 guineas bounty as an incentive to recruits in Aberdeen and also gave his recruits a written promise that they would not be drafted into another regiment. Leith-Hay adopted the "Aberdeenshire" name for the regiment, apparently causing a dispute with the rival Huntly Gordon family who had originally considered the name for their 100th Regiment of Foot (which instead became known as the Gordon Highlanders). The 100th and 109th regiments reflected the rivalries of their colonels, with both attempting various means to recruit from the limited pool of available men in north-east Scotland. Officers of the Gordons complained that the Aberdeen town council showed favour to the 109th over their regiment. The rivalry extended to the Highland Fencible Corps too, with Leith-Hay's brother, James, raising the Aberdeenshire Fencibles in 1795 in direct rivalry to the Duke of Gordon's Northern Fencibles. Leith-Hay was able to furnish his regiment with experienced officers, his majors, captains and all bar one of his lieutenants already holding commissions in other regiments. Upon its first muster the regiment comprised 32 sergeants, 30 corporals, 22 drummers and 610 privates. The officer corps comprised Leith-Hay, 2 majors, 8 captains, 14 lieutenants, 15 ensigns, a chaplain, surgeon, adjutant and quartermaster (though not all of these served at one time, with some resigning or joining later).

== Service ==
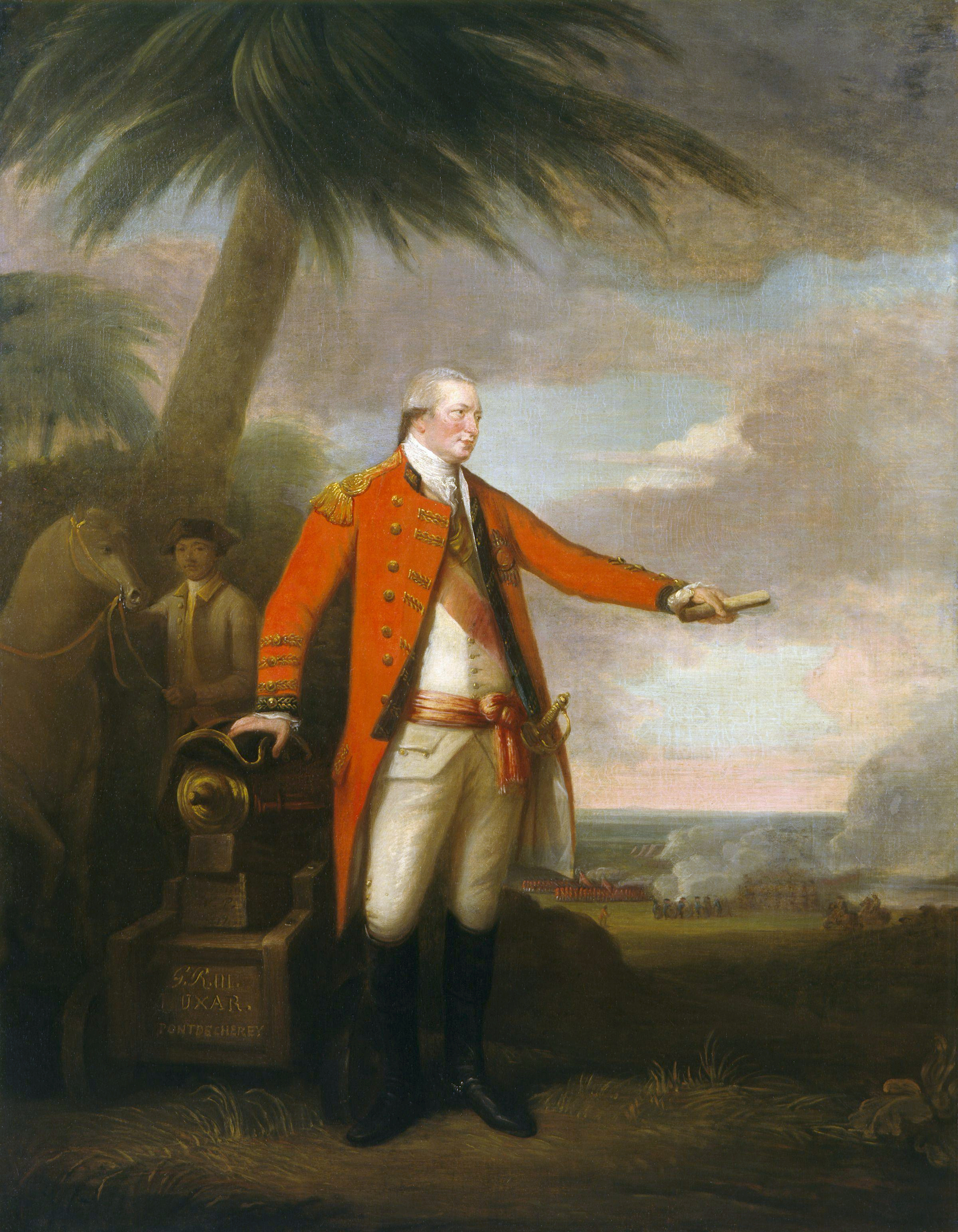
Sir Hector Munro, who inspected the regiment prior to it entering service

The regiment received its colours and was inspected by General Sir Hector Munro, 8th laird of Novar at Aberdeen on 5 September 1794. On 1 October 1794 the regiment was numbered as the 109th Foot and Hay appointed colonel by royal warrant. By September 1794 it was billeted in the Dundee area before boarding ships at Burntisland for transit to Southampton where they disembarked on 26 October.

== Disbandment ==
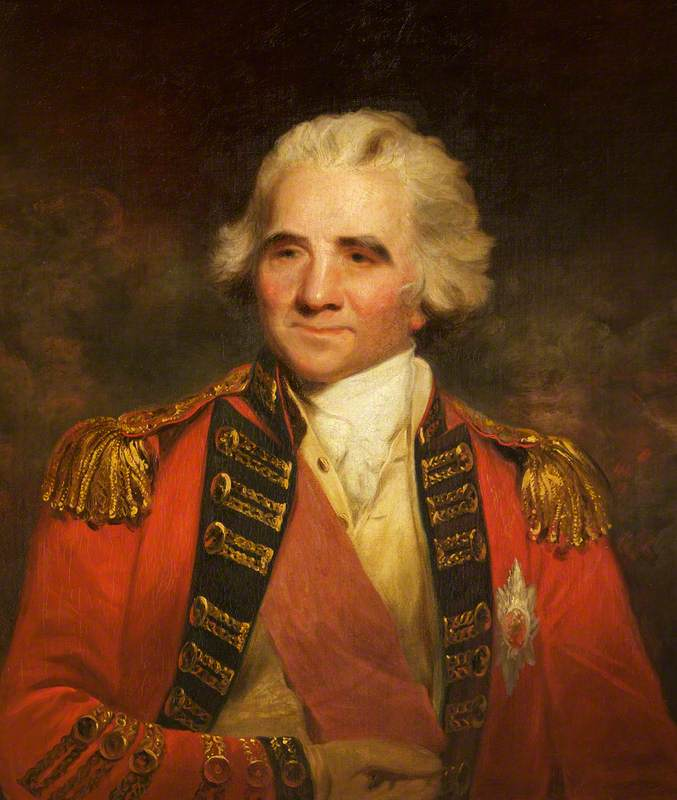
Sir Ralph Abercromby, under whose command the 109th served in 1795

In April the following year the regiment moved to Jersey, returning to England in July to form part of a force commanded by General Sir Ralph Abercromby for service in the West Indies. Whilst mustering with 19 other regiments on Nursling Common, Southampton, the regiment received the order to disband on 15 September. This caused disquiet amongst the regiment's officers and two of their number, Captain Leith and Lieutenant Leslie, were brought to the attention of General Gordon for their behaviour. Under the circumstances he showed leniency, a decision later approved of by the commander-in-chief, the Duke of York. Colonel Leith-Hay travelled to London to protest the move, claiming he had been promised that if the regiment were ever to disband it would do so in Aberdeenshire and to allow the men to enter a regiment of their own choosing as volunteers. His protests, and those of The Morning Chronicle, were in vain and the regiment ceased to exist on 24 September 1795.

The men were drafted into the existing 53rd (Shropshire) Regiment of Foot, despite an apparent attempt to place Scottish recruits into other Scottish regiments in such circumstances. Such instances of drafting of Scottish soldiers into non-Scottish regiments created a distrust among recruits that hampered recruitment north of the border. The 109th's officers were placed on half-pay.

On 26 November 1795 the House of Commons ordered that all correspondence between Colonel Leith-Hay and the government's secretaries of state regarding the raising and disbanding of the regiment be presented to the house. This was at the instigation of Generals Fitzpatrick and Macleod, who believed that the disbanding of the regiment and drafting of its men contravened the letter of service originally granted to Leith-Hay. The colonel had himself almost resigned his commission in disgust at the decision to disband the regiment. Leith-Hay went on to have a distinguished military career and became a full general of the British Army in 1838.
