= 116th Brigade =

In military terms, 116th Brigade or 116th Infantry Brigade may refer to:

== British India ==
- 116th Indian Infantry Brigade, a unit of the British Indian Army during the Second World War

== Spain ==
- 116th Mixed Brigade, a unit of the Spanish Republican Army during the Spanish Civil War

== Ukraine ==
- 116th Mechanized Brigade
- 116th Territorial Defense Brigade, a unit of the Ukrainian Territorial Defense Forces

== United Kingdom ==
- 116th Brigade (United Kingdom), a unit of the British Army during the First World War
- 116th Infantry Brigade Royal Marines, a unit of the British Royal Marines during the Second World War

== United States ==
- 116th Cavalry Brigade Combat Team, a unit of the Idaho Army National Guard in the United States Army
- 116th Mobile Brigade Combat Team, a unit of the Virginia Army National Guard in the United States Army
- 116th Military Intelligence Brigade, a unit of the United States Army

== See also ==
- 116th Division (disambiguation)
- 116th Regiment (disambiguation)
