= 112th Brigade =

In military terms, 112th Brigade or 112th Infantry Brigade may refer to:

== Germany ==
- 112th Panzer Brigade

== Soviet Union ==
- 112th "Revolutionary Mongolia" Tank Brigade, a unit of the Red Army, funded by contributions from the People's Republic of Mongolia, during World War II

== Ukraine ==
- 112th Territorial Defense Brigade, a unit of the Ukrainian Territorial Defense Forces

== United Kingdom ==
- 112th Brigade (United Kingdom), a British Army formation during World War I
- 112th Brigade, Royal Field Artillery (United Kingdom), a British Army unit during World War I

== United States ==
- 112th Medical Brigade

== See also ==
- 112th Division (disambiguation)
- 112th Regiment (disambiguation)
