= 116th (Perthshire Highlanders) Regiment of Foot =

Infantry regiment of the British Army

The 116th (Perthshire Highlanders) Regiment of Foot was an infantry regiment of the British Army, formed in 1793 and disbanded in 1795, with some personnel sent to the 42nd Highlanders.
