= 109th Regiment of Foot (1761) =

Infantry regiment of the British Army

The 109th Regiment of Foot was an infantry regiment of the British Army from 1761 to 1763.

== History ==
The 109th Regiment (Battalion of London Volunteers) was raised in the counties of Hertfordshire and Middlesex, England with Major Commandant John Nairne as Commanding Officer Establishment from December 1761 was 280 men in four companies. The Regiment was stationed at Harrow, Middlesex, then Royston and Wisbech until being sent to Aylesbury in Buckinghamshire during March 1762. In 1762 'Pountenay's Independent Company' was added as a fifth company to the Regiment to be followed by the 'Independent Company of London Volunteers, although in the strictest sense this company never served with the 109th as it was used exclusively to guard French prisoners captured during the Seven Years' War, at a camp in Bristol.

In May 1762 the 109th moved to Belleisle, recently captured from France, where it remained in garrison until the end of the War. Returning home to Bristol the 109th was stood down on 10 June 1763 and the Regiment Colours were presented by John Nairne, who was the son of the third Baron Nairne (Scotland), to the Duke of Atholl to be preserved at Blair Castle, Scotland.
