= 115th Regiment of Foot (Royal Scotch Lowlanders) =

Infantry regiment of the British Army

The 115th Regiment of Foot (Royal Scotch Lowlanders) was an infantry regiment of the British Army from 1761 to 1763.

The regiment was raised in October 1761 at Paisley, from a cadre of men detached from the 71st Regiment of Foot for recruiting. It was named the Royal Scotch Lowlanders in November, and despatched to Portugal, where it saw service in the campaign against the Spanish invasion of Portugal. It returned to Paisley in early 1763 to be disbanded.
