= 109th Brigade =

109th Brigade may refer to:

== British India ==
- 109th Indian Infantry Brigade, a unit of the British Indian Army during World War II

== Germany ==
- 109th Panzer Brigade

== Spain ==
- 109th Mixed Brigade, a mixed brigade of the Spanish Republican Army in the Spanish Civil War

== United Kingdom ==
- 109th Brigade (United Kingdom), a British Army formation during World War I
- 109th (Howitzer) Brigade, Royal Field Artillery, a British Army unit during World War I
- 109th Territorial Defense Brigade, a unit of the Ukrainian Territorial Defense Forces

== See also ==
- 109th Division (disambiguation)
- 109th Regiment (disambiguation)
