= 112th Regiment of Foot (King's Royal Musqueteers) =

Infantry regiment of the British Army

The 112th Regiment of Foot (King's Royal Musqueteers) was an infantry regiment of the British Army from 1761 to 1763. It was raised in October 1761, taking its name from George III, and was disbanded in 1763.
