= 113th Brigade =

In military terms, 113th Brigade or 113th Infantry Brigade may refer to:

== British India ==
- 113th Indian Infantry Brigade

== Germany ==
- 113th Panzer Brigade, a unit of the German Army during World War II

== Spain ==
- 113th Mixed Brigade, a unit of the Spanish Republican Army during Spanish Civil War

== Ukraine ==
- 113th Territorial Defense Brigade, a unit of the Ukrainian Territorial Defense Forces

== United Kingdom ==
- 113th Brigade (United Kingdom), a British Army formation during World War I
- 113th (Howitzer) Brigade, Royal Field Artillery (United Kingdom), a British Army unit during World War I

== United States ==
- 113th Sustainment Brigade

== See also ==
- 113th Division (disambiguation)
- 113th Regiment (disambiguation)
