= 107th Regiment =

107th Regiment may refer to:

- 107th Infantry Regiment (France)
- 107th Infantry Regiment (United States)
- 107th Cavalry Regiment, United States
- 107th Aviation Regiment (United States)
- 107th Mixed Aviation Regiment, a unit of the Yugoslav Air Force

== See also ==
- 107th Regiment of Foot (disambiguation)
