= 107th Regiment of Foot (Queen's Own Royal Regiment of British Volunteers) =

Infantry regiment of the British Army

The 107th Regiment of Foot (Queen's Own Royal Regiment of British Volunteers) was an infantry regiment of the British Army from 1761 to 1763. It was raised in October 1761 by regimentation of independent companies, and was disbanded in 1763.
