= 121st Regiment of Foot (1762) =

Infantry regiment of the British Army

The 121st Regiment of Foot was an infantry regiment of the British Army, formed in 1762 and disbanded in 1764.
