= 123rd Regiment of Foot (Loyal Lincolnshire) =

Infantry regiment of the British Army

The 123rd Regiment of Foot (Loyal Lincolnshire) was an infantry regiment of the British Army, formed in 1794 and disbanded in 1796; it took its title from the 100th Foot, disbanded in 1785.
