= 122nd Regiment of Foot (1794) =

Infantry regiment of the British Army

The 122nd Regiment of Foot was an infantry regiment of the British Army, formed in 1794 and disbanded in 1796.
