= 124th (Waterford) Regiment of Foot =

Infantry regiment of the British Army

The 124th Regiment of Foot was an infantry regiment of the British Army, formed in 1794 and disbanded in 1795.

The regiment was raised in August 1794 as "Beresford's Regiment", under the command of Lieutenant-Colonel William Carr Beresford. Beresford was the illegitimate son of the Marquess of Waterford, and the regiment was raised from the family estates in Waterford. Lord George Beresford, a younger son of the Marquess, also held a captaincy in the regiment.

The regiment was numbered as the 124th Foot the following May, and disbanded in September. It was part of a large wave of thirty new Irish regiments raised in 1793-94 following the British entry into the French Revolutionary Wars, totalling around 25,000 men; in 1795 there was a decision to disband all the highest-numbered regiments, with the men raised being drafted to other regiments for active service. The "old regiments", those on the pre-war establishment, were significantly understrength, and heavy demand for sailors for the Navy had limited the number of new recruits available for the Army.
