= 123rd Regiment of Foot (1762) =

Infantry regiment of the British Army

The 123rd Regiment of Foot was an infantry regiment of the British Army, formed in 1762 and disbanded in 1764. Its colonel was John Pomeroy.
