= 124th Regiment of Foot (1762) =

Infantry regiment of the British Army

The 124th Regiment of Foot was an infantry regiment of the British Army, formed in 1762 and disbanded in 1763. Its colonel was Robert Cuninghame, 1st Baron Rossmore.
