= 118th Regiment of Foot (1794) =

Infantry regiment of the British Army

The 118th Regiment of Foot, also known as Fingall's Regiment, was an infantry regiment of the British Army, formed in October 1794 by Colonel Richard Wogan Talbot and disbanded in October 1795. It saw service as marines (shipboard infantry) at the Battle of Groix in June 1795, losing a number of men. On disbandment, its soldiers were transferred to the 86th Foot.
