= List of British fencible regiments =

This is a list of British fencible regiments. Fencibles (from the word defencible) were military units raised in the British Empire for defence against the threat of invasion during the Seven Years' War, American War of Independence and French Revolutionary and Napoleonic Wars. The units were typically composed of local reservists commanded by British Army officers and their role was usually confined to garrison and patrol duties, freeing up regular units to perform offensive operations.

The article is broken into two periods the first list is for the fencible regiments raised during the Seven Years' War and the American War of Independence the first was raised in 1759 two years after the start of the Seven Years' War and the last was disbanded in 1783 when active hostilities with the America colonies ended and the British recognised the de facto existence of the United States of America to be formalised by the Peace of Paris (1783).

There is a far larger list for the French Revolutionary Wars and the Irish Rebellion of 1798. The regiments were raised during a time of great turbulence in Europe when there was a real fear that the French would either invade Great Britain or Ireland, or that radicals within Britain and Ireland would rebel against the established order. There was little to do in Britain other than garrison duties, escorting and guarding prisoners as happened at Edinburgh Castle and some police actions. In Ireland there was a French supported insurrection in 1798 and British fencible regiments were engaged in some minor pitched battles. Some regiments served outside Great Britain and Ireland. Several regiments performed garrison duties on the Channel Islands and Gibraltar. A detachment of the Dumbarton Fencible Regiment escorted prisoners to Prussia, and the Ancient Irish Fencibles were sent to Egypt where they took part in the operations against the French in 1801.

When it became clear that the rebellion in Ireland had been defeated and that there would be peace between France and Britain in 1802 (The preliminaries of peace were signed in London on 1 October 1801) the Fencible regiments were disbanded. The final ratification of the Peace of Amiens was concluded in March 1802. When hostilities were renewed with France during the Napoleonic Wars the British used alternative methods to defend the Home Nations (see for example the Additional Forces Acts 1803) and with the exception of the Royal Manx Fencibles (third corps, 1803–1811) no more fencible regiments were raised for home defence.

Several fencible regiments were raised in the early 1800s in Britain for the defence of Canada, some of these saw active service during the Anglo-American War of 1812 (see the section (Further information).

== List of fencible infantry regiments raised prior to 1793 ==
The total number of British fencible infantry regiments raised during the Seven Years' War and the American War of Independence was nine, of which six were Scottish, two were English and one was Manx.

lo- cal	Name	Uniform	Commander	Raised	Disbanded	Notes
SH (Note: Key: SH, Scottish Highlands; SL, Scottish Lowlands; En, England, Mx Isle of Man.)	Argyll Regiment	Highland dress. Facings yellow (Note: All the fencible regiments raised prior to 1793 were required to serve only in the country in which they were raised, except in time of invasion. All the Scottish ones, except the South Fencibles, wore the full Highland garb (Scobie 1914, p. 353).)	Colonel John Campbell, 5th Duke of Argyll.	July 1759	March 1763	When embodied was 1,000 strong. Quartered in different parts of Scotland until the peace of Paris (1763), when it was disbanded in Glasgow.
SH	Sutherland Regiment	Highland dress. Facings yellow	Colonel William Sutherland (1735-1766), 18th Earl of Sutherland.	July 1759	1763	Raised July 1759, but the officers' commissions were dated in August. 1,500 men assembled within nine days after his Lordship had arrived in the north with his Letters of Service, but the authorised establishment being only 1,000 men, the remainder had to be rejected. Permission, however, was afterwards given to augment the strength to 1,100 men. This corps was remarkable for the fine appearance of the men, as well as for their peaceable, domiciliated habits in quarters. After doing garrison duty in various parts of Scotland it was disbanded.
SH	Argyll, or Western Fencible Regiment or Western Regiment of Fencible Men.	Highland dress. Facings yellow	Colonel Lord Frederick Campbell. Lieut-Colonel Sir James Campbell Bart.	February 1778	April 1783	Embodied at Glasgow. Volunteered to extend its services to any part of the world where their country required them. This offer was accepted, but their services were not required abroad. Served in Scotland, and disbanded at Glasgow.
SL	South Fencible Regiment or Southern Regiment of Fencible Men.	Facings green	Colonel Henry Scott, 3rd Duke of Buccleuch. Lieut-Colonel Sir James Pringle, 4th Baronet.	10 April 1778	1 April 1783	Embodied at Edinburgh. Called out in 1779 to deal with a mutiny by elements of Scottish regiments. Offered to serve in any part of Great Britain. Served in Scotland. Disbanded at Dalkeith.
SH	Duke of Gordon's North Fencibles or Northern Regiment of Fencible Men.	Highland dress. Facings Yellow	Colonel Alexander, 4th Duke of Gordon. Lieut-Colonel Lord William Gordon.	May 1778	1783	Embodied at Aberdeen. Served in Scotland. In 1781 three companies under Major Mercer were deployed to engage with muskets and cannon a French privateer, the Fearnought engaged in taking two privateers (the Hazard and the Liberty moored at Aberdeen. The Fearnought escaped with both vessels, later setting fire to one. Disbanded at Aberdeen.
SH	2nd Sutherland Regiment	Highland dress. Facings Yellow	Colonel William Wemyss of Wemyss.	January 1779	1783	Embodied at Fort George. Were stationed principally in the neighbourhood of Edinburgh. Distinguished for "the sobriety, probity, and the most scrupulous and orderly attention to duty" of its men. In November 1780 a party of Sutherland fencibles held off an attack by boats from a privateer, Rohan Soubife of Dunkirk, on a Brig they had driven into Portlethen. The fencibles drove off the privateers, killing and wounding a number without loss to themselves. Disbanded at Fort George.
En	Lord Fauconberg's Regiment or Fauconberg's Fencibles		Lieutenant-Colonel Henry Belasyse, 2nd Earl Fauconberg Lieutenant-Colonel Thomas Dundas (1780)	1779	1783	Raised in 1779 in Yorkshire. Confined to garrison duty in England and disbanded in Yorkshire in 1783, (described as Lord Faunconberg's Regiment of Yorkshire Volunteers).
En	North's Fencibles or Cinque Ports Battalion of Fencible Infantry.		Lieutenant-Colonel the Hon. George Augustus North, son of Hon. Col. Cinque Ports Lord North	1779	1783	Raised in 1779, in the Cinque Ports. Confined to garrison duty in England and disbanded in 1783.
Mx	Manx Fencible Corps			1779	1783	First corps. Raised in 1779 in the Isle of Man, consisted of three companies of infantry, disbanded in 1783.

== List of fencible cavalry regiments raised between 1793 and 1803 ==
The British cavalry and light dragoon regiments were raised to serve in any part of Great Britain and consisted of a force of between 14,000 and 15,000 men. Along with the two Irish regiments, those British regiments that volunteered for service in Ireland served there. Each regiment consisted of eighteen commissioned officers and troops of eighty privates per troop. The regiments were always fully manned as their terms of service were considered favourable. The reduction of Fencible Cavalry was announced to take place on the 25th March, 1800. Early in 1800 all of the regiments were disbanded. (Note: The only commissioned officers who received half-pay, were the adjutants; and the quarter-masters were given a stipend of two shillings per day (TT 1861, p. 305))

Britain
loc	Name	Uniform	Commander	Raised	Disbanded	Notes
	First Regiment Fencible Cavalry (Light Dragoons)	As a result of their offer to serve anywhere, they were allowed to wear, on the dexter side of their helmets, a blue ribband, and also on the front thereof, a silk coronet of the same colour.	Colonel The Honourable John Villiers; Lieutenant-colonel Lord Viscount James Stopford, 3rd Earl of Courtown.	14 March 1794 (Note: Unless otherwise noted, the date raised for the fencible cavalry regiments is given as the date of the commander of the regiment was commission as commander as listed in (British War Office 1797).)	Early 1800	Not even a name for this unit was given in the War Office announcement in May 1794. Caused a riot at Wisbech Stationed at Limerick in 1797. In Edinburgh in 1799.
	Ancient British Regiment Fencible Cavalry Dragoons or Antient British Fencible Cavalry.		Colonel Sir Watkin Williams-Wynn; Lieutenant-colonel R.W.Wynne, Esq. Lieutenant-Colonel Gwilliam Lloyd Wardle succeeded Puleston (resigned)	14 March 1794	10 April 1800	Not even a name for this unit was given in the War Office announcement in May, 1794. Reported encamped at Barnet, Watford &c in 1794. Served in Ireland. Based at Newry in 1797.
	Lancashire Regiment [9]. (Note: The square bracketed numbers in this column were used in the British War Office list but no explanation is given to their significance or meaning (British War Office 1797, p. 17).)		Colonel Thomas Peter Legh. Lieutenant-colonel Bishop	14 March 1794	Early 1800	not even a name announced by the War Office in May, 1794 announcement. Reported encamped at Brighton in 1794. In April, 1795 they put down a mutiny by the Oxford Militia. In Newry in 1799.
	Rutland Regiment of Fencible Cavalry or Rutland Regiment [3]		Colonel Noel Edwards.	19 March 1794	Early 1800	reported to be encamped at Berkhamsted, St.Albans &c. in 1794.
	Somersetshire Regiment [4] or Somerset Fencible Cavalry		Colonel John, Earl Poulett. Lt-col John Strode, Esq. of Southill.	28 March 1794	Early 1800	This unit are reported offered their service anywhere in Europe in 1799.
	Norfolk Regiment [6] or Norfolk Fencible Cavalry		Colonel William Harbord. Lieut-col Sir Jacob Astley, 5th Baronet	10 April 1794	Early 1800	When the Norfolk fencible light dragoons (sic) were inspected by General Johnson at Bury in August, 1794 they consisted of six troops.
	Cinque Ports Regiment [2] or Cinque Ports Regiment of Fencible Light Dragoons		Colonel Robert, Lord Hawkesbury. Lieut-Col Addington	1 May 1794	Early 1800	a six guineas Bounty was offered to each recruit and a guinea to each person bringing a recruit. The Regiment were ordered to encamp on Barham Downs in August 1794.
	Windsor Foresters or Berkshire Fencible Cavalry [5]	Red with blue facings	Colonel Charles Rooke (1746-1827).; Lt-col Sir N. Duckenfield, Bart.	1 May 1794	June 1800	Announced by War Office in May, 1794 as Berkshire Regiment of Fencible Cavalry. 5th Regiment of Fencible Cavalry from 1798
	Surrey Regiment [7] or Surrey Fencible Cavalry		Colonel George, Lord Onslow.Lt-col T.B.H. Sewell (died 1803)	1 May 1794	Early 1800	Announced in May 1794 as Surrey Regiment of Fencible Cavalry. See also the Loyal Surrey Regiment
	Hampshire Corps of Fencible Cavalry or Hampshire Regiment	see oil canvas by Thomas Gooch	Colonel Thomas Cooper Everitt (b.1750)	13 April 1795	Early 1800	
	Cornwall Fencible Cavalry or Cornwall Regiment [11]		Colonel George, Viscount Falmouth.	14 April 1795	Early 1800	
	Loyal Essex Fencible Cavalry or Loyal Essex Regiment	Buff facings.	Colonel Montagu Burgoyne.	20 April 1795	Early 1800	Served in Ireland.Based at Enniskillen.
	Berwickshire Corps of Fencible Cavalry or Berwickshire Dragoon Corps		Lieutenant-Colonel Sir Alexander Don	21 April 1795	Early 1800	Served in Ireland.Based in Cork and Brandon. Quartered in Bristol in 1799.
	Cambridgeshire Light Dragoons, Fencible Regiment of Cavalry.		Colonel Robert Jones Adeane (1763-1823) of Babraham.	25 April 1795	Early 1800	Initially only a Cambridgeshire Troop of Fencible Cavalry was announced. Served in Ireland.Arrived in Belfast on 7 April 1797 Reportedly the first corps of fencible cavalry to leave this kingdom (sic). Based in Londonderry in 1797 and 1799. Reported to have offered their services for any part of Europe in January 1799.
	Lanark and Dunbarton Regiment	Black facings, bonnet and trews or kilt.	Colonel William Hamilton.	2 May 1795	Early 1800	Served in Ireland.
	Dumfrieshire Regiment		Colonel Michael Stuart Maxwell.	4 May 1795	Early 1800	Served in Ireland.In Drogheda, Dundalk in 1799.
	Fifeshire Corps		Lieutenant-Colonel Commandant John Anstruther Thomson. (June 1796)	8 May 1795	Early 1800	Based at Antrim in 1797.
	Warwickshire Corps of Fencible Cavalry or Warwickshire Regiment [12]. (Note: A Birmingham recruiting bill for the Warwickshire Regiment of Fencible Light Dragoons (Langford 1868, p. 179) June 2, 1794.—Warwickshire Regiment of Fencible Light Dragoons, commanded by the Earl of Warwick. All high-spirited Young Men, who are able and willing to serve their King and Country, in support of their most excellent and happy Constitution, the Envy of the World, have now a glorious opportunity of shewing their Zeal in the Warwickshire Regiment of Cavalry, to serve only during the present War, and within the Kingdom of Great Britain, to be commanded by the Right Hon. Earl Brooke and Warwick, and other officers of the County. A Bounty of Five Pounds will be given to each young man who is approved of, and One Guinea to any Person bringing such Recruit. They will be all mounted on fine Hunters, superior to most Regiments of Light Dragoons. Let them repair to the Sergeant, at Mr. Owen's, the sign of the Eagle, in Hill Street: and at the Rose and Crown, in Moor Street, where they will enter into present Pay and Good Quarters. God save the King.)		Colonel George, Earl Warwick. succeeded by Major-General George Churchill Lieut-Col Francis Gregory of Styvechale Park (19 May 1794)Lieut-Col Charles Ed. Repington of Ilmington (17 Jan 1799)	19 May 1794	April 1800	On 18 September 1797 they marched from Colchester to Sheffield to relieve a cavalry regiment sent to Scotland. Coventry, April 7 the last of the 6 troops marched in here and have been disbanded.
	Lothian (East & West) Regiment		Colonel John Hamilton.	29 May 1795	Early 1800	
	Lothian (Mid) Regiment Fencible Light Dragoons.		William Earl of Ancram.	29 May 1795	Early 1800	Served in Ireland.Based at Dundalk. In Limerick in 1799.
	Sussex Regiment or Sussex Corps of Fencible Cavalry		Major-commandant (later Colonel) Sir George Thomas Colonel Sir James St. Clair Erskine, second Earl of Rosslyn (1762-1837). Lieutenant-colonel Teesdale	13 April 1795	Early 1800	Colonel Thomas and Lieut-colonel Teesdale were both subject to a court martial 1795
	Princess of Wales's Regiment [13], Princess of Wales's Fencible Dragoons or Durham Regiment of Fencible Cavalry		Colonel commandant William, Earl of Darlington. Lieutenant-Colonel Daniel Ord Major-General Banastre Tarleton appointed in 1799	14 April 1795	Early 1800	Initially announced as Durham Regiment of Fencible Cavalry. Served in Ireland. In Scotland in 1795. In Clonmel in 1799.
	Pembrokeshire Regiment of Fencible Light Dragoons or Pembrokeshire Corps		Lieutenant Colonel Commandant Henry Davis.	18 April 1795	Early 1800	The fencibles were in Ireland in 1797 thereby unable to participate in repelling the French at the Battle of Fishguard.
	Oxfordshire Regiment		Colonel Thomas Parker.	20 April 1795	Early 1800	
	New Romney Fencible Cavalry (Duke Of York's Own)	Red with silver lace (Blue with silver in Ireland's)	Major-commandant (later Colonel) Cholmeley Dering (died 1836)	20 April 1795*	Early 1800	* New Romney corps of Fencible cavalry, commanded by Major Dering are ordered to encamp on Barham Downs in August, 1794. Served in Ireland.Based at Loughlinton, Co Dublin in 1797 In Wexford in 1799.
	Roxburgh and Selkirkshire Regiment of Fencible Cavalry or Roxburghshire Regiment of Fencible Cavalry		Colonel Sir John Scott	21 April 1795	Early 1800	In Denbigh in 1796, where one of their Welsh recruits deserted. Based in Connaught in 1797.
	Princess Royal's Own Regiment		Colonel Andrew McDowall.	1 May 1795	Early 1800	
	Perthshire Fencible Cavalry or Perthshire Regiment		Colonel Charles Moray of Abercairny (died 1810).	29 May 1795	Early 1800	Based in Galway in 1797.
	Ayrshire Regiment		Colonel Andrew Dunlop.	19 June 1795	Early 1800	

Ireland
loc	Name	Uniform	Commander	Raised	Disbanded	Notes
	First Regiment or Lord Jocelyn's First Regiment of Fencible Cavalry	Fur-crested Tarleton helmets, dark blue jacket, with white cord and lace, and white britches.	Lieutenant-Colonel Robert, Viscount Jocelyn.	18 July 1795		Officers commissioned 21 Jul 1794. At Athlon in 1799
	Second Regiment or Lord Glentworth's Second Regiment of Fencible Cavalry	Fur-crested Tarleton helmets, dark blue jacket, with white cord and lace, and white britches.	Lieutenant-Colonel Edmund, Lord Glentworth.	18 July 1795		Officers commissioned 4 Aug 1794. In Lismore and Tallagh in 1799.

== List of fencible infantry regiments raised between 1793 and 1803 ==
=== Scottish fencibles ===
loc- ale	Name	Uniform	Commander	Raised	Disbanded	Notes
SH	Princess of Wales's (or Aberdeen Highland) Regiment of Fencible Infantry.	Highland dress. Facings yellow	Colonel James Leith. Lieutenant-colonel Archibald McNeil.	25 October 1794	11 September 1803	Raised 25 October 1794. Embodied at Aberdeen. Based in Londonderry in 1797. Disbanded in Ireland, 11 September 1803.
SL	Angus Volunteers	Facings Buff, or facings yellow, and bonnet and trews	Major-Commandant John Fraser.	27 September 1794	1799	Strength, two companies.
SL	Angus-shire Regiment	Facings yellow (Note: "According to Colonel Hamilton Smith this corps wore the bonnet and kilt" (Scobie 1914, p. 355), but it may have been bonnet and trews (Reid 2011, p. 20).)	Colonel Archibald Douglas, 1st Baron Douglas. Lieut-Colonel (later Col) David Hunter.	20 October 1794	19 July 1802	Had a good many Highlanders from the Highland borders. Served in Ireland. Based at Cavan in 1797. Disbanded at Perth.
SH	1st Argyllshire Regiment	Highland dress. Facings yellow	Colonel George, Marquis of Lorne.	2 March	1799	Embodied at Stirling. Its services were confined to Scotland.
SH	2nd Argyllshire Regiment	Highland dress. Facings Blue	Colonel (later General) Henry Mordaunt Clavering (1765-1850).	25 October 1794	24 July 1802	Served in Ireland. Based at Blair in 1797. Disbanded at Ayr.
SH	3rd Argyllshire Regiment	Highland dress. Facings yellow	Colonel Archibald Macneill of Colonsay.	15 June 1798	3 July 1802	The name of Argyll did not properly apply to this corps, as the number of Argyllshire men was very small. Its service extended to any part of Europe, (Note: The soldiers of those fencible regiments whose services extended, or who volunteered their services (and were accepted), to any part of Europe, or the world, were entitled to pensions when disabled, in the same manner as if in regiments of the line. Neither at that period nor for many years after were there any such pensions to officers, however severe their wounds, or however much disabled (Scobie 1914, p. 355 cites Stewart of Garth, Sketches of the Highlanders, vol. ii. p. 330.).) and in 1800 was sent to Gibraltar. Ordered home at the peace of 1801. Disbanded at Dumbarton.
SH	Breadalbane Regiment	Highland dress. Facings yellow	Colonel the Earl of Breadalbane and Holland.	2 March 1793	28 July 1802	3 Battalions
	Breadalbane Regiment — 1st Battalion		Lieutenant-Colonel William Maxwell Morrison (late 77th Foot).	2 March 1793	18 April 1799	Embodied at Perth. Volunteered for duty in Ireland, August 1798, but its services were not required. Remained in Scotland. Disbanded at Fort George. (Note: Duncan Ban MacIntyre, the famous hunter-bard of Glenorchy, was a soldier in this battalion, in which he served till its disbandment. His discharge document is still in existence (Scobie 1914, p. 355 cites Calder, G., The Gaelic Songs of Duncan MacIntyre).)
	Breadalbane Regiment — 2nd Battalion		Lieutenant-Colonel Andrew Macdouall (1758-1834) of Logan. MP	8 March 1793	18 April 1799	Embodied at Perth. In 1798 the greater part of this corps volunteered for service in Ireland, and landed at Carrickfergus in September. Returned to Scotland in March 1799. Disbanded at Paisley.
	Breadalbane Regiment — 3rd Battalion		Lieutenant-Colonel John Campbell (1715-1791), 5th of Achallader.	9 December 1794	28 July 1802	Served in Ireland. Based at Down in 1797. Disbanded at Ayr.
En	Loyal British Regiment	Facings Blue	Colonel Sir Robert Steuart, 1st Baronet.	24 October 1794	1802	
SH	Caithness Legion.	The bonnet and tartan pantaloons (truis). Facings yellow or (Note: The belt-plate of this regiment bore the Thistle and Crown, with the word "Caithness" above, and below, the legend, "Flodden Field" (Scobie 1914, p. 356).) white.	Colonel Sir Benjamin Sutherland Dunbar of Hempriggs, 3rd Baronet (1761-1843).	15 November 1794	1802	Served in Ireland. Based at Bantry in 1797. Disbanded at Enniscorthy.
SH	Royal Clan Alpine Regiment	Highland dress. Facings Blue.	Colonel Alexander Macgregor Murray (1746–1822) of Napier Ruskie	21 September 1798	24 July 1802	Raised for general service in Europe. Embodied at Stirling. Served in Ireland. Disbanded at Stirling.
??	Banffshire (Duke of York's Own) Regiment	The bonnet and truis. Facings probably yellow.	Colonel Andrew Hay of Mountblairey. Lieut-Col Francis John Wilder then Lieut-Colonel Fergusson succeeded by Lieut-Colonel Nicholas Nepean (1757-1823)	26 July 1798	10 May 1802	This regiment had a number of Highlanders in its ranks. Garrisoned Gibraltar. (Note: "The Regiments in the Garrison were 5th, 44th, Cambrian Rangers, Banffshire Fencibles, 2nd Argllshire Fencibles, and the Prince of Wales Own Fencibles, Governor's Letter Book, 1759–1800, GGA." (Musteen 2011, p. 218 (note 54)) — other sources state it was the 3rd Argyll Fencibles who garrisoned Gibraltar.)
SH	Dumbartonshire Regiment of Fencible Infantry	Black facings, Highland dress, or trews	Colonel Colin Campbell of Stonefield (died 1839). Lieutenant-Colonel Murdoch Maclaine (1730-1804), 19th of Lochbuie (1795) Lieutenant-colonel F.J.Scott (1802)	14 August 1794	5 October 1802	Embodied at Dumbarton. Served in Guernsey, and afterwards in Ireland during the rebellion, where it was actively occupied and employed as a light infantry corps in the mountains, under Sir John Moore, who kept it constantly near his person. "By the recommendation of General Moore, a detachment of the regiment was ordered as a guard to 400 rebel prisoners sent to Prussia, with directions that 'the detachment should consist entirely of Highlanders, as the service required confidential, trustworthy men'.". Disbanded at Dumbarton.
SL	Lord Elgin's Regiment.	The bonnet and truis. (Note: General Stewart and Colonel H. Smith's Mss. According to Colonel Smith's drawings, purses (sporran) were worn by regiments in truis as well as by kilted ones. The purses he shows are mere indications, all alike, and evidently not regimental variations. It seems improbable, however, that purses were worn in all the regiments wearing truis.) Facings green	Colonel Thomas, Earl of Elgin. Lieut-Colonel John Hepburn Belches.	28 November 1794	15 October 1802	There were about 300 Highlanders in this corps. Served in Ireland. Based at Cork in 1797. Disbanded at Linlithgow.
SL	Fifeshire Fencibles	Facings yellow	Colonel (later General) James Durham (1754-1840) of Largo. Lieut.Colonel Thomas Durham.	20 October 1794	11 April 1803	Served in Ireland. Based at Enniskillen in 1797. Disbanded at Kilkenny.
SH	Fraser Fencibles	Highland dress. Facings black	Colonel James Fraser of Belladrum (1732-1808). Lieutenant-colonel Lewis M'Kenzie	29 November 1794	12 July 1802	Embodied at Inverness. of the soldiers, 300 bore the name of Fraser. Served in Ireland. Based at Dublin in 1797. Disbanded at Glasgow.
SH	Glengarry or British Highland Regiment	Highland dress. Facings yellow	Colonel Alexander Macdonnell of Glengarry. Lieut-colonel Charles Maclean.	14 August 1794	1 July 1802	Raised as a Catholic corps. According to General Stewart, more than one-half of the men in this regiment were enlisted from the estate of Glengarry. Of the thirty-two officers, twenty-two were Macdonnells or Macdonalds. Served in Jersey, Guernsey, and in Ireland, where they were actively employed during the rebellion, earning for themselves the sobriquet of the "Devil's Bloodhounds". (Note: So called on account of their garb and their unfailing success in hunting down the rebels (Scobie 1914, p. 357 cites Macdonell, Rev. Father Macdonell, "The Glengarry Fencibles", Transactions of the Gaelic Society of Inverness, xxvi) Disbanded at Ayr, after which the greater part of the regiment emigrated, together with their families and relations, to Canada, settling in a district to which they gave the name of their native glen. In February 1812, a regiment known as the Glengarry Light Infantry Fencibles was raised in Canada, a proportion of which was made up of soldiers of the former fencible regiment or members of their families. The colonel of the regiment was E. Baynes and a major in the regiment was George Macdonnell. It was disbanded in August 1816.
SH	Royal Inverness Highlanders	Highland dress. Initially buff facings, became blue facings when they became the Duke of York's.	Colonel John Baillie (died 1797) of Dunain.	21 November 1794	25 August 1802	Embodied at Inverness. Served in Ireland during the Irish Rebellion of 1798, and after its suppression the designation of the corps was changed to "The Duke of York's Royal Inverness-shire Highlanders" as a compliment to their good behaviour. In 1801 the regiment voluntarily offered to serve in any part of the world, but owing to the preliminaries of peace having been signed, their services were not required abroad. Disbanded at Stirling.
SH	Regiment of the Isles, or Macdonald Fencibles	Highland dress. Facings yellow	Colonel Alexander, Lord Macdonald.	29 May 1798	26 July 1802	Embodied at Inverness. Served in Scotland and England. Disbanded at Fort George.
SH	Lochaber Fencibles	Highland dress. Facings black	Colonel Donald Cameron of Lochiel.	15 June 1798	26 June 1802	Embodied at Falkirk. Served in Ireland. Disbanded at Linlithgow.
SL	North Lowland Regiment	Facings green. (Note: Scobie 1914, p. 358 notes: According to Colonel H. Smith, this corps wore the infantry uniform, with truis)	Colonel Thomas Balfour (1752-1799) of Elwick.	November 1794	6 August 1802	There were a number of Highlanders in this corps. Served in Ireland. Based at Monaghan in 1797. In Dungannon in 1799. Disbanded at Dundee.
SL	West Lowland Regiment. (Note: Scobie 1914, p. 358 notes: also known as the " Western Fencibles.")	Facings Green. (Note: Scobie 1914, p. 358 notes: In Kay's ' Edinburgh Portraits,' vol. ii. p. 330, it is stated that this regiment wore the Highland uniform, "to which garb the Earl was extremely partial". According to Colonel Smith, however, the uniform was that of the Line, with truis.)	Colonel Hugh Montgomerie, 12th Earl of Eglinton.Lieut-colonel William Mure	2 March 1793	26 March 1799	Disbanded at Musselburgh.
HS	Princess Charlotte of Wales' or Loyal Macleod Fencibles	Highland dress. Facings blue	Colonel John Macleod of Colbecks.	15 June 1798	11 June 1802	Embodied at Elgin. Served in Ireland. Disbanded in England at Tynemouth Barracks.
HS	The Northern or Gordon Fencibles	Highland dress. Facings yellow. (Note: Scobie 1914, p. 359 Notes: General Stewart of Garth. This regiment wore black belts (Colonel H. Smith's Mss.))	Colonel Alexander, Duke of Gordon.	3 March 1793	1799	Embodied at Aberdeen. Its services were confined to Scotland, but the men having volunteered to extend it, the offer was accepted, and in 1794 the regiment moved to England. "When quartered in Kent, the King, who had never seen a Highland regiment, ordered them up to London, where they were reviewed in Hyde Park in the presence of His Majesty, who expressed himself highly satisfied with their appearance." Disbanded in Scotland.
SI	Orkney and Shetland Corps of Fencible Men Or Orkney Battalion.	Facings yellow	Major-Commandant Thomas Balfour (1752-1799) of Elwick.	20 April 1793	1799	Strength, three companies.
SH	Perthshire Highlanders (Note: Also known as "The Perthshire Regiment of Fencibles" (Scobie 1914, p. 359).)	Facings yellow. (Note: Scobie 1914, p. 359 notes: General Stewart of Garth. The regiment, however, wore the kilt, probably of Robertson tartan. Military History, of Perthshire, p. 176.)	Colonel William Robertson of Lude.Lieut-Colonel John Robertson.	20 October 1794	27 February 1799	Embodied at Perth. "Although called Perthshire Highlanders, this was a misnomer, as the number of Perthshire Highlanders, or Highlanders of any county, was very limited". Based at Galway in 1797. Disbanded at Preston.
SL	Prince of Wales's Own	The bonnet and truis. Facings yellow	Colonel Sir William Johnstone (1765-1841), 2nd Baronet.	15 June 1798	21 May 1802	Served in Ireland. May have garrisoned Gibraltar. Disbanded at Plymouth.
SH	Reay Highland Regiment	Highland dress. Facings light grey-blue	Colonel Mackay Hugh Baillie of Rosehall.	24 October 1794	13 October 1802	Embodied at Elgin. Served in Ireland. Based at Belfast in 1797. Was present at the battles of Tara Hill and Ballinamuck. In Cavan in 1799. Disbanded at Stirling.
SH	Ross-shire Highland Regiment	Highland dress. Facings yellow	Major-Commandant Colin Mackenzie of Mountgerald.	20 November 1794	1799	Strength, two companies. Although a small corps, the men were noticeable for their "exemplary character and physical capacity. No man was punished; none died during its service".
SH	Ross And Cromarty Rangers	Highland dress. Facings yellow	Colonel Lewis Mackenzie, younger of Scatwell.	8 August 1798	27 July 1802	Raised for service in any part of Europe. Embodied at Inverness. Served in Scotland and Ireland. Disbanded at Inverness.
SH	Rothesay and Caithness Highlanders	Highland dress. Facings yellow (Note: The uniform of this regiment consisted of the red jacket and white waistcoat, red and white hose, buckled shoes, white goatskin purse with black tassels, "feathered bonnet, with a plaid thrown across the shoulders, and tartan pantaloons, in imitation of the truis, surmounted with a stripe of yellow along the seams, a fringe of tartan on the outside of the thigh, and the same round the ankle".Scobie 1914, p. 360 quoting Stewart of Garth, Sketches of the Highlanders, vol. ii. In a rare work, consisting of four quarto pages, compiled by Colonel Sir John Sinclair, and entitled, Account of the Rothesay and Caithness Fencibles, there is an excellent frontispiece illustrating the uniform of the regiment, which is exactly as General Stewart describes it (Scobie 1914, p. 360). This "Account" was "particularly addressed to the officers, non-commissioned officers, and private soldiers of the (1st) Battalion, that they might remember they belonged to so respectable a corps". From it we learn that this battalion might claim the distinction of being the first fencible corps raised for service in Britain, the previous corps being embodied for service in their own country only, (Scobie 1914, p. 360 citing Old Scottish Regimental Colours, by Andrew Ross, S.s.c., p. 126.))	Colonel Sir John Sinclair of Ulbster.			2 Battalions.
	Rothesay and Caithness Highlanders — 1st Battalion.		Lieutenant-Colonel James, Earl of Caithness. succeeded by Lieutenant-Colonel George Boyle, 4th Earl of Glasgow	7 March 1794	6 May 1799	Embodied at Inverness. Remarkable for the size of its officers, twenty of whom averaged six feet in height, and who were consequently known as "Thier-nan-more" or "The great chiefs". Served in Scotland and the north of England. Disbanded at Bruntsfield Links, Edinburgh.
	Rothesay and Caithness Highlanders — 2nd Battalion.		Lieutenant-Colonel Benjamin Williamson of Banniskirk.	19 November 1794	July 1802	Embodied at Forfar. 150 of its soldiers were rejected at inspection, marched back to Scotland and discharged at Glasgow. Served in Ireland for two years, where it was distinguished for its exemplary conduct. Based at Cork. In 1797 this battalion volunteered for service in any part of Europe, but was not called upon to go abroad. Disbanded at Glasgow.
SI	Shetland Battalion	Facings —	Major-Commandant George Malcolmson.	8 February 1798	1802	Strength, two companies.
SL	Southern Regiment. (Note: Scobie 1914, p. 360 notes: Also known as the "South Fencibles " or the "Hopetoun Invincibles".)	Facings Light grey-blue	Colonel James Hope-Johnstone, 3rd Earl of Hopetoun.	2 March 1793	12 April 1799	Served in Scotland. Disbanded at Linlithgow.
SH	1st (or Strathspey) Regiment of Fencible Infantry or Grant or Strathspey Regiment	Highland dress. Facings green.	Colonel Sir James Grant of Grant.	2 March 1793	April 1799	Embodied at Forres. Served in Scotland. Disbanded at Inverness.
SH	Sutherland Regiment.	Highland dress. Facings yellow	Colonel Major-General William Wemyss of Wemyss.	2 March 1793	March 1799	Embodied at Fort George. Extended its services to Ireland in 1797. In 1799 in Newry. Disbanded at Fort George, many of the officers and men transferring their services to the 93rd Sutherland Highlanders, raised by General Wemyss on a letter of service dated 16 April 1799.
	Loyal Tarbert Regiment.	Facings blue	Colonel Sir Edward Leslie of Tarbert, 1st Baronet.(1744-1818)	27 July 1798	19 June 1802	Disbanded at Plymouth.
	The Loyal Tay Regiment.	Facings blue	Major the Hon. David Lellie, from the 59th foot, was appointed Lieutenant-Colonel in the Loyal Tay regiment of fencible infantry, with permanent rank the army in 1795. Colonel Sir Robert Anstruther, Bart.	25 October 1794	28 June 1802	This regiment had a good many Highlanders from the Highland borders. Replaced the Cardigan Militia at Chester in 1795. Served in Ireland.In Dungannon in 1797. Located in Carrickfergus in 1799. Disbanded at Stirling.

The Scottish Fencibles raised in 1793 had eight companies each, except the Orkney, which had three.

Those raised in 1794–1802 had ten companies, except the 1st Battalion Rothesay and Caithness Regiment, which had eight, and three others — the Angus Volunteers, Ross-shire and Shetland Fencibles — which had only two companies.

Of the total number of Scottish corps raised from 1739 to 1802, independent of Colonel Macneil's Argyll, Colonel Robertson's Perthshire (both having very few Highlanders), and the Ross-shire Fencibles (which are not included, as their number was small), the total number of Fencibles raised in the Highlands, and considered as exclusively Highland, amounted to twenty-six battalions Some of the other Scottish Fencibles, however, although not nominally Highland, had a number of men from the Highlands in their ranks, and this fact is noted in the above list under the regiments concerned.

=== English fencibles ===
Name	Uniform	Commander	Raised	Disbanded	Notes
Royal Lancashire Volunteers.	Blue facings?	Sir Thomas Grey Egerton, 6th baronet.	1779	1783	This regiment's services were confined to garrison duty in England.
Royal Lancashire		Colonel Lord (later Viscount) Grey de Wilton (died 1814. Prior to peerage Sir Thomas Grey Egerton, 6th baronet).	16 October 1794	1801–2	Ten companies. Served in Ireland during the rebellion
Northampton Fencibles	Blue facings red collar.	Lieut-colonel (later General) John Manners Kerr (1769-1843) until March 1798. Lieutenant-Colonel Bulkeley (by 1802)	20 October 1794	1801–2	Ten companies. Served in Ireland during the rebellion. Based at Athlone in 1799.
Loyal Essex Regiment of Fencible Infantry		John E. Urquhart. Colonel James Edward Urquhart Lieut-Colonel (later Col) Richard Thomas Nelson	20 October 1794	1801–2	Ten companies. Served under Sir James Duff in Limerick district, Ireland during the rebellion.
Loyal Nottingham	Green facings.	Colonel James O'Connor	20 October 1794	1801–2	Ten companies. Served in Ireland during the rebellion. At Brandon in 1799.
Suffolk Fencible Cavalry.		Sir William Rowley, 2nd Baronet	20 October 1794	1801–2	
Loyal Suffolk		Colonel John Robinson	20 October 1794	1801–2	Ten companies. A posting to Jersey in 1795 became tragic, the C.O.'s wife, Rebecca a daughter of Major-General Robert Clive, 1st Baron Clive died and a number of troops died on a stormy return crossing to England. In Ireland during the rebellion: disembarked at Pigeon House Pier, Dublin, 1 July 1799, strength 27 officers and 525 other ranks; in Kilcullen later in 1799.
Loyal Somerset or Somersetshire Fencible Cavalry	Yellow facings.	Colonel William Frederick Forster of Taunton Lodge.	20 October 1794	1801–2	Ten companies. In Jersey in 1795. A number of troops died on a stormy return crossing to England. Served in Ireland during the rebellion. At least five troops based in Sheffield in November, 1798.
York Fencible Regiment of Foot or York		Colonel Hon. Granville Anson Chetwynd-Stapylton (1758-1834) Lieutenant-Colonel James Worsley (died 1807)	20 October 1794	1801–2	Ten companies. Served in Ireland during the rebellion
Devon and Cornwall		Colonel Robert Hall	15 November 1794	1801–2	Ten companies. Quartered in Bandon in 1795. Based in Limerick in 1797. In Bantry, Ireland in 1799.
The Prince of Wales's Loyal Leicester Fencibles, or Prince of Wales's Leicester		Colonel Thomas Parkyns, 1st Baron Rancliffe	15 November 1794	1801–2	Ten companies. Served in Ireland during the rebellion. In Sligo in 1799.
Loyal Cheshire Fencibles or Cheshire		Colonel Charles Courtenay. Colonel Clement Stafford Courteney (1795) Lieutenant-Colonel James Campbell (1795)	17 November 1794	1801–2	Ten companies. In Wexford, Ireland in 1799.
Loyal Durham Fencibles or Loyal Durham	Green facings.	Col. Barrington Price (1757-1839)	26 February 1795	1801–2	Ten companies. Served in Ireland during the rebellion. Based in North of Ireland in 1797. In Gorey in 1799. whilst in Naas in 1801 offered to serve anywhere in world.
Northumberland Fencibles		Colonel Sir Francis Blake, 3rd Baronet, of Twizell Castle	28 February 1795	1801–2	Ten companies.
Newfoundland Fencible Infantry		Colonel Thomas Skinner (British Army officer, born 1759)	25 April 1795	1801–2	Ten companies.
Scilly		Captain Henry Gudgeon	19 April 1796	1801–2	One company.
Loyal Surrey Regiment.		Colonel George Augustus Pollen.	1799	1800	1794: formation as the Surrey Cavalry, From 1800 became the Loyal Surrey Regiment of Rangers.
Royal Canadian Volunteers.			1799		The regiment was posted to Nova Scotia
Fauconberg's Fencibles.			1799		
North's Fencibles.			1799		
Loyal Surrey Regiment of Rangers, or Pollen's Fencibles		Colonel George Augustus Pollen.	1800	1802	Ten companies. Previously the Loyal Surrey Regiment of Fencible Infantry. In Nova Scotia.

=== Irish fencibles ===
Name	Uniform	Commander	Raised	Disbanded	Notes
Loyal Irish (1st Battalion)		Colonel William Handcock	15 November 1794	1801–2	Ten companies. In 1795 at Bristol en route to Jersey, 200 refused to proceed unless paid the remainder of their bounty. Eighteen of the mutineers were taken prisoner by Sir John Cardon's dragoons.
Loyal Irish (2nd Battalion)		Colonel William Handcock	15 December 1794	1801–2	Ten companies.
Loyal Limerick or Loyal Limerick Fencible Infantry		Sir Vere Hunt	15 June 1798	1801–2	Ten companies.
Ancient Irish		Colonel Sir Thomas Judkin Fitzgerald, 1st Baronet, of Lisheen	5 June 1799	August 1802	Ten companies. The Ancient Irish volunteered for service abroad, and were actually sent to Egypt for a time, taking part in the operations against the French in 1801.

=== Welsh fencibles ===
Name	Uniform	Commander	Raised	Disbanded	Notes
Cambrian Rangers		Colonel Pollen (sic) Colonel Thomas Mellor (died 1838) Lieutenant-Colonel James St. Clair William Edwardes, 2nd Baron Kensington	8 August 1798	1802	This regiment was composed of ten companies. The Weymouth sailed with the regiment to serve in the garrison of Gibraltar in 1800. Marched to Bristol to be disembodied in April 1802

=== Manx fencibles ===
Name	Uniform	Commander	Raised	Disbanded	Notes
Royal Manx Regiment (1st Battalion)		John Murray, 4th Duke of Atholl	20 February 1793	1801–2	Second corps. The 1st Battalion of Manx Fencibles had three companies (for first corps, raised in 1779 see the Manx Fencible Corps above).
Royal Manx Regiment (2nd Battalion)	Blue facings, fur crest around hat.	John Murray, 4th Duke of Atholl, KT, PC, FRS	7 April 1795	1801–2	Second corps. Ten companies. The 2nd Battalion served in Ireland. Based in Strabane in 1797. Some of the men in this battalion were recruited in return and the list of officers shows a few names which suggests a connection with Perthshire (the duke was Lord-Lieutenant of Perthshire).
Royal Manx Regiment (3rd Battalion)		Colonel James Murray, 1st Baron Glenlyon (1809)	12 July 1803	1811	Third corps. The services performed by this regiment was the defence of the Isle of Man, assisting the Revenue in the prevention of smuggling, and supporting the civil power. The four last companies of the Regiment were raised partly with the view of their supplying volunteers for line regiments. A list of military units records Royal Manx at Isle of Man in 1804.

=== Further information ===
Three other Fencible Corps may have been raised between 1795–1798, which were disbanded in 1801–2 viz.:

- Royal Birmingham or Rann's Fencibles
- Nova Scotia Provincial Regiment (for service in Canada), 1803–1816: Newfoundland, Nova Scotia, Quebec, Ontario.
- Prince Edward's Island Fencibles (for service in Canada)

In 1803 four Fencible Corps were raised for service in Canada. They were:

- Royal Newfoundland, or Skerret's Fencibles, 1803–1816: Newfoundland, Nova Scotia, Quebec, Ontario. located at St.Johns in 1804. raised in Newfoundland.
- New Brunswick, or Hunter's Fencibles, raised in 1803, numbered 104th in 1810, New Brunswick. Listed as a corps at New Brunswick in 1804.
- Nova Scotia, or Wetherall's Fencibles Located in Halifax, Nova Scotia in 1804. In January 1804 Lieut-Colonel John A. Vesey, from 52nd was appointed to be Lieutenant-Colonel, vice Roberts, deceased. Lieut-Col John Taylor succeeded Lieutenant-Col Anderson in 1806.
- Canadian Regiment of Fencible Infantry, or Peter's Fencibles

They were all disbanded in 1816.

Besides the established regiments there were seven regiments (each of one battalion) for which Letters of Service were issued, but which never appear to have been formed. Five were to have been raised in Scotland and two in England, with a strength of ten companies each:

Date of letter of service or Order of raising	Colonel or Commissioner	Notes
20 October 1794	Lieutenant-Colonel Morison	
15 November 1794	David Hunter	
15 June 1798	Dunbar	
20 July 1798	Dunlop	
31 July 1798	Alex. McGrigor	
10 August 1798	Tyndale	
10 December 1798	James Kann	

The total number of fencible infantry corps embodied 1793–1802 was thus 61 battalions of which 29 were Scottish, 15 were English, 4 Irish, 1 Welsh and 2 Manx. "Most of the Fencible Corps," writes Sir John Fortescue "were created either in 1794 or 1798, and to judge by the old Monthly Army Lists of 1799, the greatest number of them in existence at one time in Great Britain was 31 regiments of cavalry and 45 battalions of infantry. But by March 1800 the greater part of the cavalry had been disembodied, so that it would not be wise to reckon the Fencibles as exceeding, at their highest figure, twenty to twenty-five thousand men". (Note: Fortescue 1915, p. 889 notes: The official list of Auxiliary Forces in 1800 shows 13 regiments of fencible cavalry and 46 battalions of fencible infantry.)

The preliminaries of peace were signed in London on 1 October 1801. The final ratification of the Peace of Amiens, however, was not concluded until March 1802. Fortescue writes "most, if not all, of the fencible infantry were disbanded in May 1801, before the signature of the preliminaries of peace", but Ian Scobie states that this was not so, as the greater number were not disbanded until late in 1801 or early in 1802, and that many of the Scottish fencibles, were not disbanded until some time after the Peace of Amiens had been signed (as will be seen from the preceding lists).

The disbandment of the fencibles in 1802, and "the establishment in that year of a permanent Scots Militia, rendered unnecessary any further organisation on a large scale of this more ancient but partial system of national defence".

== See also ==
- Sea Fencibles
- List of British Commands and Army groups
- Crochallan Fencibles
