= Royal Manx Fencibles =

British army fencible regiment

The Royal Manx Fencibles was a fencible regiment of the British Army which was raised on the Isle of Man. Its duties included home defence, but it performed various tasks away from the Isle of Man, and was in Ireland at the time of the 1798 Rebellion.

== Origins ==
The Manx Fencibles had two stages of existence, one beginning in 1779, and lasting, with intervals, for approximately 20 years. In 1779 the church played its part in the raising of the regiment, with the Bishop ordering that a proclamation be read from the pulpit calling for the raising of three corps of Fencibles for the defence of the island. The second stage began in 1795, when John Murray, 4th Duke of Atholl, received authority from the Secretary for War to raise "by beat of drum or otherwise" a body to be called the 2nd Royal Manx Fencibles.

The word "Fencible" is not peculiar to the Isle of Man; the Royal Manx Fencibles formed part of locally raised "volunteer regiments raised for local defence during a special crisis", and the Duke of Atholl would have been well accustomed to the raising of such regiments in Scotland.

Appointed Colonel of the regiment, the Duke was at the forefront of the recruiting process: he appeared throughout the island, notably at Douglas market place. He had the authority to raise ten companies. Each company had three sergeants, three corporals, three drummers, and sixty privates, with two fifers for the Grenadier company, besides a sergeant major and quartermaster sergeant, which would give an overall strength of about 700 personnel.

In two months 225 men had enlisted, besides 40 from each of the five companies of the earlier regiment, which had been raised for service in the Isle of Man only. To complete the number, an officer and sergeant were sent to recruit in Wigtownshire.

The majority of the fencibles enrolled were despatched to Liverpool and Warrington and subsequently to Yorkshire. The remainder stayed behind in Douglas whilst they awaited instructions.

One recruit, a young Scotsman named Robert M'Kerlie, was present at the promulgation ceremony held at Tynwald Hill, which he described as:

Being desirous that I should see everything worth notice, I was prevailed upon to accompany my colleague Menzies to see the grand spectacle, comprising in all due pomp the Lieutenant Governor of the Island, the principal officers and the professors of the law at Tynwald. The principal persons were on a green mound where the laws of the Island were read in Manx as is the usual custom, and to a great multitude assembled to witness the ceremony. A church was near the place but no other building that I remember. Many tents were erected and the whole affair gave the impression of a day at a great festivity. The procession was guarded to and from the mount by a strong company of infantry and a body of volunteers. Menzies entered into the proceedings of the day with spirit, and before all was over I had no reason to be ashamed of my companion.

— Isle of Man Times, (3 October 1936).

M'Kerlie received orders to report at Scarborough and left for Liverpool by the packet Duke of Athole. She entered the Mersey after spending one night at anchor. He proceeded by coach to Scarborough Castle, which was the regimental headquarters, and thence to Whitby, where he placed himself under the command of Major Peachy, who had charge of three of the companies. By this time the colonelcy had been transferred to the Duke's brother, Lord Henry Murray, and the lieutenant colonel was Charles Small.

In August, two months after M'Kerlie's arrival in Scarborough, the regiment marched to Liverpool from where they sailed to Dublin. Just before the sailing they lined up for inspection at Mount Pleasant – referred to at the time as "an elevated and much frequented place overlooking the town".

The upkeep of uniform was highly important, with M'Kerlie observing:

The useless and absurd custom of dressing the hair with powder and the large clubs of the period were by no means calculated to give comfort to either officers or men, and upon march was particularly objectionable during stormy weather and rain. When at Whitby a private by the name of Jack Ratcliffe was eminent for the puff, causing clouds of hair powder in the officers' apartments.

— Isle of Man Times, (3 October 1936).

A list of the men's "necessaries" compiled by Captain Moore includes reference to a "queue" or "platt", and there is also quoted the following entry:

As a sufficient number of false tails cannot be got in the Island, the captains of the companies will immediately inspect the tails of the men in their commands, and send a return to headquarters mentioning the numbers wanted.

— Isle of Man Times, (3 October 1936).

The shirts too were frilled at the breast; the ruffles, M'Kerlie says, were changed twice in the week. The battalion officers' uniform in this period would typically consist of: long coats and cocked hats, white feathers topped with black, white breeches and long boots, with steel mounted half basket swords, facings in dark blue (royal), with gold lace and gold epaulets. While in Ireland the long coat was replaced by the Austrian fashioned jacket with short broad skirts. White breeches and black gaiters were laid aside for winter, in favour of long grey trousers with scarlet seams. In addition cocked hats gave way to helmets with bearskins bearing in front the motto: "Toujours pres" (Ever ready). Imposing as this dress was, it was far outshone by that decreed for the Light Company, which was under the command of the brother of The Hon. Andrew Forbes.

The social life of the officers was what one would imagine from writers of the period. The practice of heavy drinking was commonplace and encouraged amongst brother officers. As for the rank and file, the free use of whisky led many to be flogged. The Manx officers in the regiment were from the most respected families of the time; notable amongst them were William Bacon, Captain John Christian and Captain (later Major) Cesar Tobin, brother-in-law of Sir William Hillary.

== Deployment in Ireland ==
When the regiment arrived in Dublin, three days after setting out from Liverpool, they felt that they were not welcome. Ireland at that time was smouldering with disaffection, and not long after came the unsuccessful landing by a French army, the Expédition d'Irlande, under the command of General Hoche to assist the United Irishmen. Almost immediately after landing in Ireland the Manx Fencibles marched to Omagh and on to Strabane and finally Derry where they stayed for some time. Later the regiment was stationed in Lifford, County Donegal and at Coleraine when the Irish Rebellion of 1798 broke out.

== 1798 Irish Rebellion ==
The regiment erected defensive lines in Coleraine, the streets leading to the Town House being cut off by entrenchments to prevent the building being taken by surprise. For some time the regiment awaited an assault, until it was resolved to march out and attack the rebels. The regiment marched to Ballymena, and, although they found that the rebels had abandoned it, they still proceeded to set the town on fire. On 8 July 1798, following the Battle of Antrim, the regiment marched out of Coleraine into the surrounding countryside, where they burnt houses and farms. Livestock was seized and unresisting people were driven from their homes following which they were looted and burnt.

The defeat of the United Irishmen was followed by their punishment. A permanent court-martial was set up at Coleraine at which M'Kerlie, a deeply religious man, was a member and recording his thoughts as:

I believe all implicated in the rebellion as officers, in the first burst of indignation suffered death. Now this was a dreadful state of things. I for one was a mere boy, and I had no proper notion of the awful responsibility devolving upon the court, who were not overnice in feelings of mercy, and very likely passed sentence on an unfortunate fellow creature without any deep convictions or much reflection as to the consequences to follow. It is revolting to me as I write it, to think that our fellow mortals, who had souls to save, being so infamously treated. What effect the executions had upon the spectators, I cannot tell; but the received opinion, I believe, is that such public spectacles do more to harden than to soften the heart.

— Isle of Man Times (3 October 1936).

Following the rebellion M'Kerlie transferred to the Dumfriesshire Regiment.

== Disbandment ==
According to some records the Manx Fencibles were disbanded in 1802, shortly after the signing of the Peace of Amiens; however a manuscript book shows that an establishment of them existed in the years 1810 and 1811. The establishment was by that time reduced to four companies, mustering 280 privates, 40 NCOs and 12 officers (4 Captains, 4 Lieutenants and 4 Ensigns). Headquarters were at Castletown, where there were stationed 130 privates, 7 corporals, 6 sergeants and the regiment's three drummers. Douglas had 60 privates and 10 NCOs; Ramsey 50 privates and 8 NCOs and Peel 40 privates and 6 NCOs. The Peel detachment provided a guard at Kirk Michael.

The officers mainly hailed from the Isle of Man, but some hailed from Scotland and England, having been enrolled when the regiment was on service in England and Ireland. The Lieutenant Colonel at the beginning of this period was Robert Steuart, the Receiver General of the Isle of Man, who built the Villa Marina; he was succeeded by James Murray, 1st Baron Glenlyon. The paymaster was William Scott and the surgeon John Nelson Scott – both of whom were relatives of the novelist Sir Walter Scott.

The Fencibles were permitted to assist with the harvest. An order dated August 24, 1810, provides that such men will be exempt from duty and parades, except on Sundays. The number was limited so that three reliefs remained on guard duties, and every man had to return at night. On September 29, the men employed in the harvest were directed to attend all parades and bring up their guards they had missed during their absence. The Manx Fencibles were finally disbanded in 1811.

== See also ==
- List of British fencible regiments
