= Sutherland Fencibles =

Sutherland Fencibles may refer to any of three units:

- Sutherland Fencibles (1759)
- Sutherland Fencibles (1779)
- Sutherland Fencibles (1793)
