= Highland Fencible Corps =

Fencible units raised in the Scottish Highlands (1759–1799)

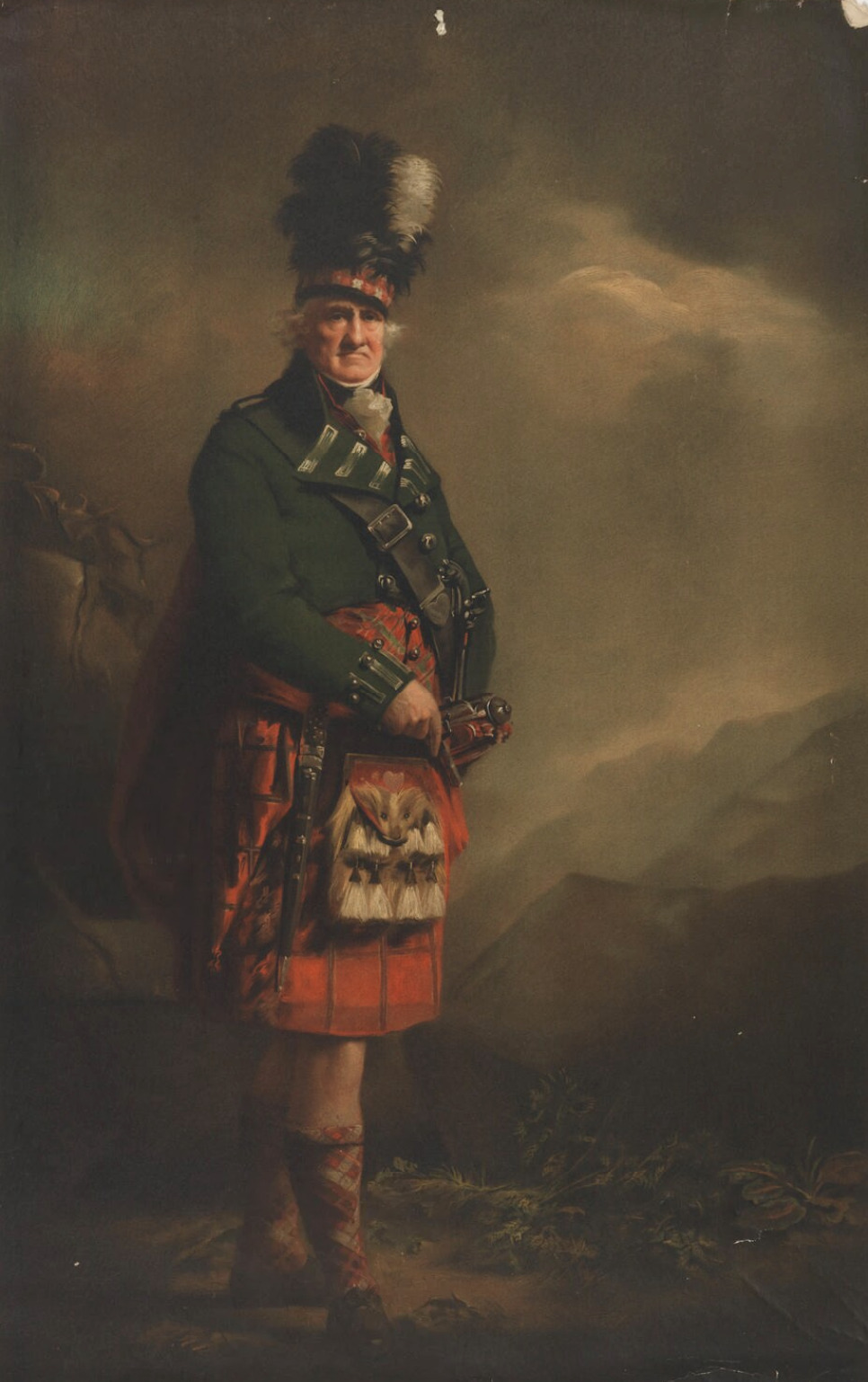
- c. 1810 portrait of a lieutenant colonel of the Breadalbane Fencibles
- Active: 1759–1763; 1778–1783; 1793–1802
- Country: Great Britain; United Kingdom
- Branch: Fencibles
- Type: Military reserve force
- Role: Internal security
- Engagements: Seven Years' War; American War of Independence; French Revolutionary Wars; Irish Rebellion of 1798

In the military history of Great Britain, the plan of raising a fencible corps in the Scottish Highlands was first proposed and carried into effect by British politician William Pitt the Elder, (afterwards Earl of Chatham) in the year 1759. During the three preceding years, both the fleets and armies of Great Britain had suffered reverses, and it was thought that a "home guard" was necessary as a bulwark against invasion.

In England, county militia regiments were raised for internal defence in the absence of the regular army; but it was not deemed prudent to extend the system to Scotland, the inhabitants of which, it was supposed, could not yet be safely entrusted with arms due to the Jacobite risings. Groundless as the reasons for this caution may have been in regard to the Lowlands, militias could have been hazardous in the Highlands at a time when the Stuarts and their adherents were still plotting a restoration to have armed the clans. An exception, however, was made in favour of the people of Argyle and Sutherland; accordingly, letters of service were issued to John Campbell, 5th Duke of Argyll, then the most influential and powerful nobleman in Scotland, and William Sutherland, 18th Earl of Sutherland, to each raise a fencible regiment within their districts.

Unlike the militia regiments which were raised by ballot, the fencibles were raised by the ordinary mode of recruiting, and like the regiments of the line, the officers were to be appointed and their commissions signed by the king. The same system was followed at different periods down to the year 1799, the last of the fencible regiments having been raised in that year. The following is a list of the Highland fencible regiments according to the chronological order of the commissions:

== Seven Years' War ==
=== Argyle Fencibles (1759) ===
The commissions of the officers of the Argyle Fencibles were dated in the month of July, 1759. The regiment, which consisted of 1,000 men, was raised in three months. Of 37 officers, 21 were of the name of Campbell. The regiment was quartered in different parts of Scotland, and disbanded in the year 1763.

=== Sutherland Fencibles (1759) ===
Though the commissions of the officers were dated in the month of August, the Sutherland Fencibles was raised several weeks before that of Argyle Fencibles, 1,100 men having assembled at the call of the earl of Sutherland, on the lawn before Dunrobin Castle, within nine days after his lordship's arrival in Sutherland with his letters of service.

The martial appearance of these men, when they marched into Perth in May, 1760, with the earl of Sutherland at their head, was never forgotten by those who saw them, and who never failed to express admiration of their fine military air. Some old friends of mine, who often saw these men in Perth, spoke of them with a kind of enthusiasm. Considering the abstemious habits, or rather the poverty of the Highlanders, the size and muscular strength of the people are remarkable. In this corps there was no light infantry company; upwards of 260 men being above five feet eleven inches in height, they were formed into two grenadier companies, one on each flank of the battalion.

— David Stewart.

This regiment was disbanded in May, 1763.

== American War of Independence ==
=== Argyle or West Fencibles (1778) ===
The Argyle or West Fencibles was raised by Lord Frederick Campbell, who had been appointed colonel, and it was embodied in Glasgow in April, 1778. Of the men, 700 were raised in Argyleshire and other parts of the western Highlands; the rest were recruited in Glasgow and the south-west of Scotland. Sir James Campbell of Ardkinglas was appointed lieutenant-colonel, and Hugh Montgomery of Coilsfield, afterwards Earl of Eglintoun, Major. The regiment was disbanded in 1783.

=== Gordon Fencibles (1778) or Northern regiment of Fencible Men ===
The Gordon Fencibles regiment, which consisted of 960, was raised by Alexander, Duke of Gordon on his estates in the counties of Inverness, Moray, Banff, and Aberdeen. He was appointed colonel and Lord William Gordon to be Lieutenant-colonel, James Chisholm and James Mercer to be majors and George Gordon, Lord Haddo a captain. In a newspaper notice for a General Muster at Elgin in September 1778, the title Northern Fencible Highlanders is used by Major Mercer. It was embodied at Aberdeen, and disbanded in 1783. During the five years this regiment was embodied, only twenty-four men died.

=== Sutherland Fencibles (1779) ===
The family of Sutherland being at that time represented by an infant female (Elizabeth Gordon), countess of Sutherland (afterwards the duchess-countess of Sutherland) and no near male relative of the name to assume the command of this regiment, William Wemyss of Wemyss, nephew of William Sutherland, 18th Earl of Sutherland), was appointed colonel. With the exception of two companies from Caithness, commanded by William Innes of Sandside, and John Sutherland of Wester, the recruits were raised on the Sutherland estates; and so desirous were the men of Sutherland of entering the regiment, that in the parish of Farr, Sutherland alone 154 were enlisted in two days. In February 1779 the regiment was embodied at Fort George, whence it marched southward, and was stationed in the neighbourhood of Edinburgh during the part of its service. In November 1780 a party of Sutherland Fencibles held off an attack by boats from a privateer, Rohan Soubife of Dunkirk, on a brig the privateers had driven into Portlethen. The fencibles drove off the privateers, killing and wounding a number without loss to themselves. It was disbanded in 1783.

Samuel Macdonald, better known by the sobriquet of "Big Sam", was a soldier in the regiment. He was born in the parish of Lairg in Sutherland, and was of extraordinary stature, being seven feet four inches in height, and every way stout in proportion. Being too large to stand in the ranks, he was generally placed on the right of the regiment when in line, and marched at the head when in column. Whether on duty, marching with his regiment, or on the streets, he was always accompanied by a mountain-deer of uncommon size, which was greatly attached to him.

[Samuel's] parents were of good size, but in nothing otherwise remarkable. Macdonald had fortunately a quiet, equable temper. Had he been irritable, he might, from his immense strength and weight of arm, have given a serious blow, without being sensible of its force. He was considered an excellent drill, from his mild and clear manner of giving his directions. After the peace of 1783 he enlisted in the Royals. From thence he was transferred to the Sutherland Fencibles of 1793. The countess of Sutherland, with great kindness, allowed him 2s. 6d. per diem extra pay, judging probably that so large a body must require more sustenance than his military pay could afford. He attracted the notice of the Prince of Wales, and was for some time one of the porters at Carlton house. When the 93d was raised he could not be kept from his old friends; and joining the regiment, he died in Guernsey in 1802, regretted by his corps as a respectable, trust-worthy, excellent man.

— David Stewart.

== French Revolutionary Wars and Irish Rebellion of 1798 ==
=== Grant or Strathspey Fencibles (1793) ===
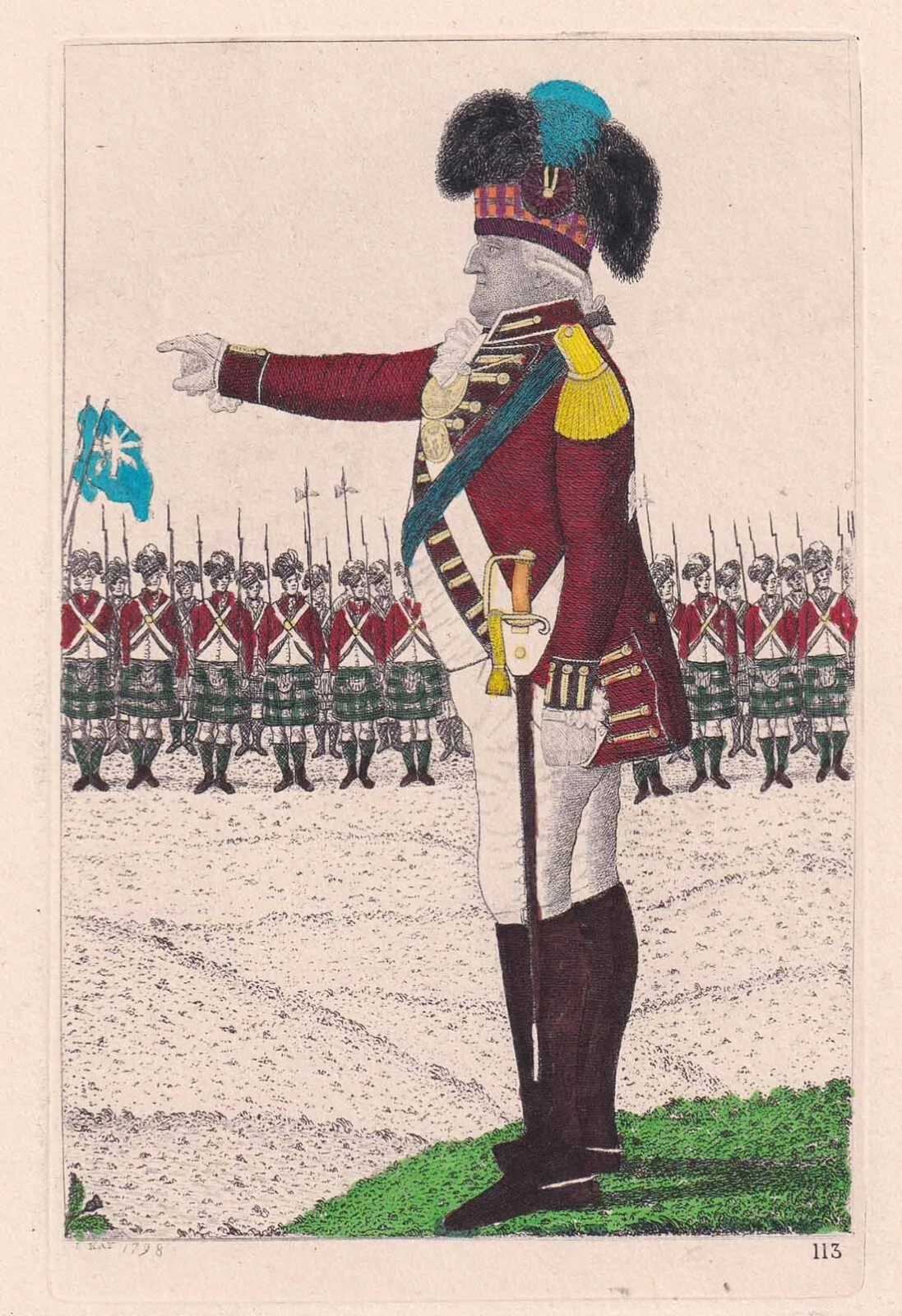
1798 portrait of Sir James Grant with the Strathspey Fencibles in the background.

The Grant or Strathspey Fencibles were raised when Sir James Grant, 8th Baronet, having offered to raise a regiment, he obtained permission to do so, and two months after the declaration of war by France, the regiment was assembled at Forres in the end of April, 1793. With the exception of 41 Scottish Lowlanders, three Englishmen, and two Irishmen, the regiment consisted of Highlanders. On 5 June it was embodied and inspected by Lieutenant-general Alexander Leslie, marched to the southward in August, and quartered successively in most of the towns in the south of Scotland.

Whilst the fencibles were stationed at Dumfries in 1795, a mutiny broke out amongst the Strathspey Highlanders. A spirit of jealousy and distrust of their officers had taken deep root in the breasts of the men, in consequence of an attempt that had been made the preceding year at Linlithgow, to induce them to extend their service, which was confined to Scotland. They erroneously conceived that there was a design to entrap them; a suspicion which appears to have originated in the conduct of the officers, some of whom did not explain the nature of the proposals to their men, whilst others entirely mistook their import and meaning.

For a time the good understanding between the officers and the men appeared to have returned; but an incident which occurred at Dumfries rekindled the dying embers of dissension, and led to the most unpleasant consequences. A soldier in the ranks having made a jocular remark, which was considered as offensive by the officers, he and some of his comrades, who appeared to enjoy the joke, were put into confinement, and threatened with punishment This injudicious step roused the feelings of the Highlanders, who considered themselves as insulted and disgraced in the persons of the prisoners, and they could not endure that such a stain should "attach to themselves and their country from an infamous punishment for crimes, according to their views, not in themselves infamous in the moral sense of the word". The consequence was, that many of the soldiers, in open defiance of their officers, broke out, and released the prisoners.

After this unfortunate affair, the regiment was marched to Musselburgh, when Corporal James Macdonald, and privates Charles and Alexander Mackintosh, Alexander Fraser, and Duncan Macdougall, were tried, and being found guilty of mutinous conduct, condemned to be shot. The corporal's sentence was restricted to a corporal punishment. The four privates were marched out to Gullane Links, East Lothian, on 16 July 1795, and when they had arrived on the ground they were told that only two were to suffer, and that the two Mackintoshes would be permitted to draw lots. They accordingly drew, when the fatal one fell on Charles, who, with Fraser, was immediately shot in presence of the Scots Brigade, (afterwards the 94th regiment) and the Sutherland, Breadalbane, and Grant Fencibles. The others were ordered to join regiments abroad.

No other act of insubordination occurred in the regiment, which was disbanded in the year 1799.

=== Breadalbane Fencibles (1793 and 1794) – three battalions ===
The Breadalbane Fencibles were raised when John Campbell, Earl of Breadalbane, moved by the same patriotic feeling which actuated Sir James Grant, offered to raise two fencible regiments, which were completed in the summer of 1793. A third battalion was embodied a few months thereafter, under an arrangement, that its service, if necessary, should be extended to Ireland. The number of men raised was 2,300, of whom 1,600 were obtained from the estate of Breadalbane alone.

A mutiny, similar in every respect in its cause, object, and consequences, to that of the Strathspey Fencibles, occurred amongst the Breadalbane Fencibles, at Glasgow in 1795. Measures were taken to secure the ringleaders; but so many of the men were concerned, that it was found almost impossible to make a proper distinction. The difficulty was however solved by some of the soldiers themselves, who, becoming sensible of their error, with a noble and high-minded feeling, voluntarily offered to stand trial, and to abide the issue. They were accordingly sent to Edinburgh castle, tried, and four of their number condemned to be shot, but only one, Alexander Morland, suffered. He was shot on Musselburgh Sands.

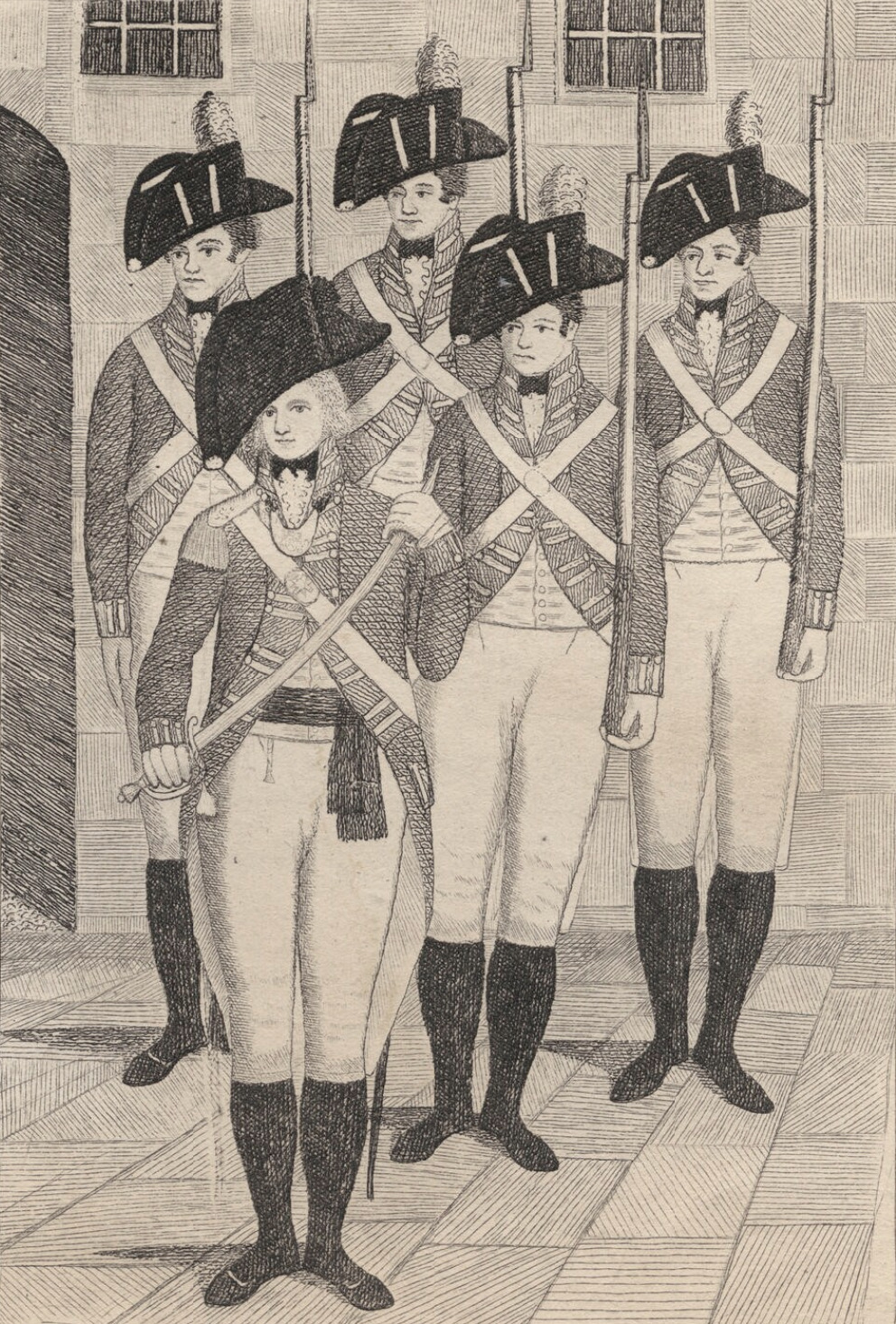
1795 engraving of an ensign and four privates of the Hopetoun Fencibles

An anecdote of one of these men, related by David Stewart, affords a striking illustration of the faithfulness of the Highlanders in fulfilling obligations. On the march to Edinburgh, this man stated to Major Colin Campbell, who commanded the party, that he knew what his fate would be, but that he had left business of the utmost importance to a friend in Glasgow, which he wished to transact before his death; that as to himself he was fully prepared to meet his fate, but, with regard to his friend, he could not die in peace unless the business was settled; and that if the officer would permit him to return to Glasgow, he would join his comrades before they reached Edinburgh. He added, "You have known me since I was a child; you know my country and kindred, and you may believe I shall never bring you to any blame by a breach of the promise I now make, to be with you in full time to be delivered up in the castle". Major Campbell, a very judicious and humane man, was startled at this extraordinary proposal; but having perfect confidence in the prisoner, he complied with his request. The soldier, accordingly, returned to Glasgow at night, transacted his business, and left the town before day-light to redeem his pledge. To avoid observation, he made a circuitous route through woods and over hills, which retarded him so much, that he did not appear at the appointed hour. Major Campbell, on reaching the neighbourhood of Edinburgh without his prisoner, was greatly perplexed. He had indeed marched slowly forward, but no soldier appeared; and unable to delay any longer, he entered the city, marched up to the Castle, and as he was delivering over the prisoners, but before any report had been given in, Macmartin, the absent soldier, rushed in amongst his fellow-prisoners, all pale with anxiety and fatigue, and breathless, with apprehension of the consequences in which his delay might have involved his benefactor.

The first and second battalions of the Breadalbane Fencibles were discharged in 1799 along with the Grant, Gordon, Sutherland, Rothsay, Caithness, (1st battalion) Argyle, and Hopetoun Fencible regiments, whose services were limited to Scotland.

The third battalion was sent to Ireland in 1795, and remained in that country until 1802, when it was disbanded.

=== Sutherland Fencibles (1793) ===
This regiment, which mustered at the call of the Countess of Sutherland, was embodied at Fort George. Colonel Wemyss, who had commanded the regiment of 1779, was appointed colonel, and the Honourable James Stuart, brother of Francis, Earl of Moray, lieutenant-colonel. The numerical strength of the corps was 1,084 men, with drummers and pipers. This contained a company from Ross-shire, commanded by Captain Robert, Macleod of Cadboll.

The crew of the Dutch frigate mutinied and surrendered their vessel, Jason, on 8 June 1796 at Greenock, Scotland. When Jason surrendered she had more than 200 men aboard, so a "great party" from the Sutherland Fencibles marched from Glasgow to Greenock to take possession of the frigate. The Royal Navy took Jason into service as HMS Proselyte.

In 1797 the regiment extended its services to Ireland; but, with the exception of one skirmish, no opportunity offered for distinguishing itself in the field. The conduct of the Sutherland Fencibles, during the troubles, was most exemplary; and it was said of them, that "their conduct and manners softened the horrors of war, and they were not a week in a fresh quarter, or cantonment, that they did not conciliate and become intimate with the people". The regiment was disbanded in March 1799. It was from the disbanded ranks of this corps that the 93rd Regiment of Foot was principally formed.

=== Gordon Fencibles (1793) ===
Alexander, Duke of Gordon's commission as colonel of the Gordon Fencibles (1793–1799), was dated 3 March; and not long after this the regiment was raised and embodied at Aberdeen. The uniform was the full Highland garb. The Duke raised upwards of 300 men on his estates in Strathspey, Badenoch, and Lochaber, and about an equal number was recruited on the neighbouring estates. About 150 more were raised in the Lowlands of Aberdeen, Banff, and Elgin. In 1794 it was moved to England, having agreed to extend its service. The Gordon Highlanders were reviewed by George III in Hyde Park. The regiment was disbanded, along with the other fencible regiments, in 1799.

=== Argyle Fencibles (1793) ===
Letters of service for the Argyle Fencibles, dated 1 March, were issued to the George, Marquis of Lorne to raise this corps. It was shortly afterwards embodied at Stirling and after six years' service, was disbanded in 1799.

=== Rothesay and Caithness Fencibles (1794 and 1795) – two battalions ===
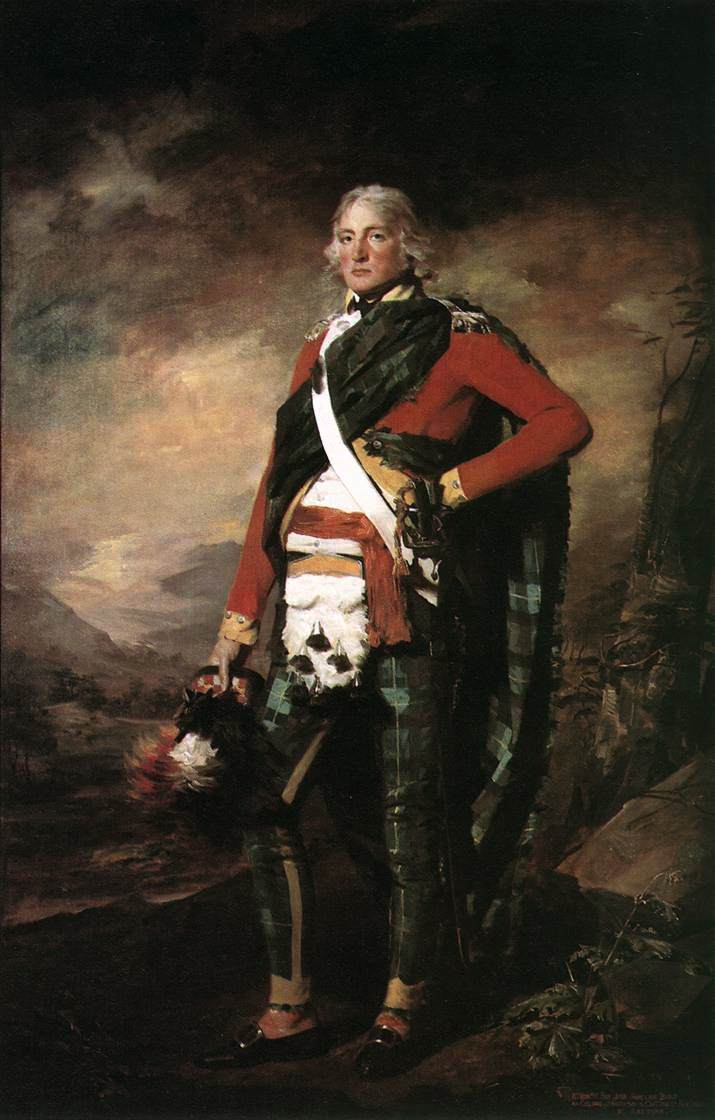
Portrait of Sir John Sinclair in the uniform of the Caithness Fencibles

Rothesay and Caithness Fencibles (8th Fencible Regiment) were raised after letters of service were granted to Sir John Sinclair, 1st Baronet to raise a fencible regiment of Scottish Highlanders, whose services should extend to England. The regiment was accordingly formed, and as both officers and men were principally natives of Caithness, it was at first called the Caithness Fencibles; but the Prince of Wales having granted permission that Rothesay, his chief title in Scotland, should be added, the battalion was afterwards called the Rothesay and Caithness Fencibles. Another reason for this conjunction was that the counties of Bute and Caithness then sent alternately a member to represent them in parliament.

This regiment was assembled at Inverness in October, 1794, and embodied by Lieutenant-general Sir Hector Munro. The corps attracted particular notice from the majestic stature of the officers, nineteen of whom averaged 6 feet (1.8 m)in height. The uniform of the regiment was a bonnet and feathers, with a plaid thrown across the shoulders, and tartan pantaloons in imitation of the trews, surmounted with a stripe of yellow along the seams, a fringe of tartan on the outside of the thigh, and the same round the ankle. The tartan worn was the same or nearly the same as that of the 92nd (Gordon Highlanders) Regiment (Black Watch with an over-check of yellow over the green). This battalion was disbanded in 1799.

A second battalion was raised by Sir John Sinclair in 1795, and embodied by Major-General James Hamilton at Forfar, in the May of that year. The service of this regiment was extended to Ireland. This corps was more mixed than the first; only about 350 men from Caithness and Sutherland having entered the regiment. The establishment and uniform of the battalion was the same as the first. The regiment was soon after its formation moved to Ireland, where it remained several years. In 1799, the regiment was augmented to 1,000 effective men, under the designation of the Caithness Highlanders, with officers in proportion.

Of the exemplary conduct of the regiment, some idea may be formed from the following extract of an address presented to Lieutenant-colonel James Fraser of Culduthill, who commanded the regiment several years in Ireland, by a meeting of the magistrates of the county of Armagh, in the year 1798, the Lord Viscount Gosford, the governor, in the chair:

We beg leave to testify our highest approbation of the conduct of the Rothsay and Caithness Fencibles, during a period of fourteen months, and under circumstances of peculiar difficulty. Divided, from the unfortunate necessity of the times, into various cantonments, and many of them stationed in a manner most unfavourable to military discipline, they yet preserved the fidelity of soldiers, and the manly rectitude of their national character. It is with pleasure and satisfaction we declare, that the tranquillity which this county is now happily beginning to enjoy, must, in many respects, be ascribed to the ready obedience and proper deportment of the officers and men under your command. For reasons thus honourable to them, and grateful to ourselves, we return you our most sincere thanks, and request you will communicate to the officers, non-commissioned officers, and soldiers, this testimony of our esteem, and acknowledgement of their exemplary conduct.

In 1797 the regiment, with the exception of about 50 men, volunteered their services to any part of Europe. In the summer of 1800, 200 men volunteered into the 79th and 92nd regiments. As an ensign was to be appointed to every 50 men who should volunteer from the fencible regiments, four officers from the Caithness Highlanders obtained commissions in the 79th and 92nd of the line.

The Caithness Fencibles returned to Scotland in 1802, and were disbanded the same year.

=== Dumbarton Fencibles (1794) ===
The Dumbarton Fencibles was raised by Colonel Campbell of Stonefield, agreeably to orders, dated 11 October 1794, and was inspected and reported complete by Major-general Sir James Stewart, in the summer of the following year. Colonel Campbell was appointed its colonel.

The regiment was first stationed in Guernsey, and in 1797 was moved to Ireland, being reduced to 500 the previous year. Murdoch Maclaine of Lochbuy, the lieutenant-colonel, was moved to the Argyle Fencibles, on the transference of the regiment to Ireland, and was succeeded by Lieutenant-colonel Scott.

The Dumbarton Fencibles were actively employed during the Irish Rebellion. They were particularly noticed by Sir John Moore, who, after the rebellion was crushed, stationed them as a light infantry corps in the mountains under his own eye, and such was his confidence in them, that he selected a detachment of this regiment to guard 400 prisoners sent to Prussia, "as the service required confidential and trust-worthy men".

The regiment returned to Scotland in 1802, and was disbanded the same year.

=== Reay Fencibles (1794) ===
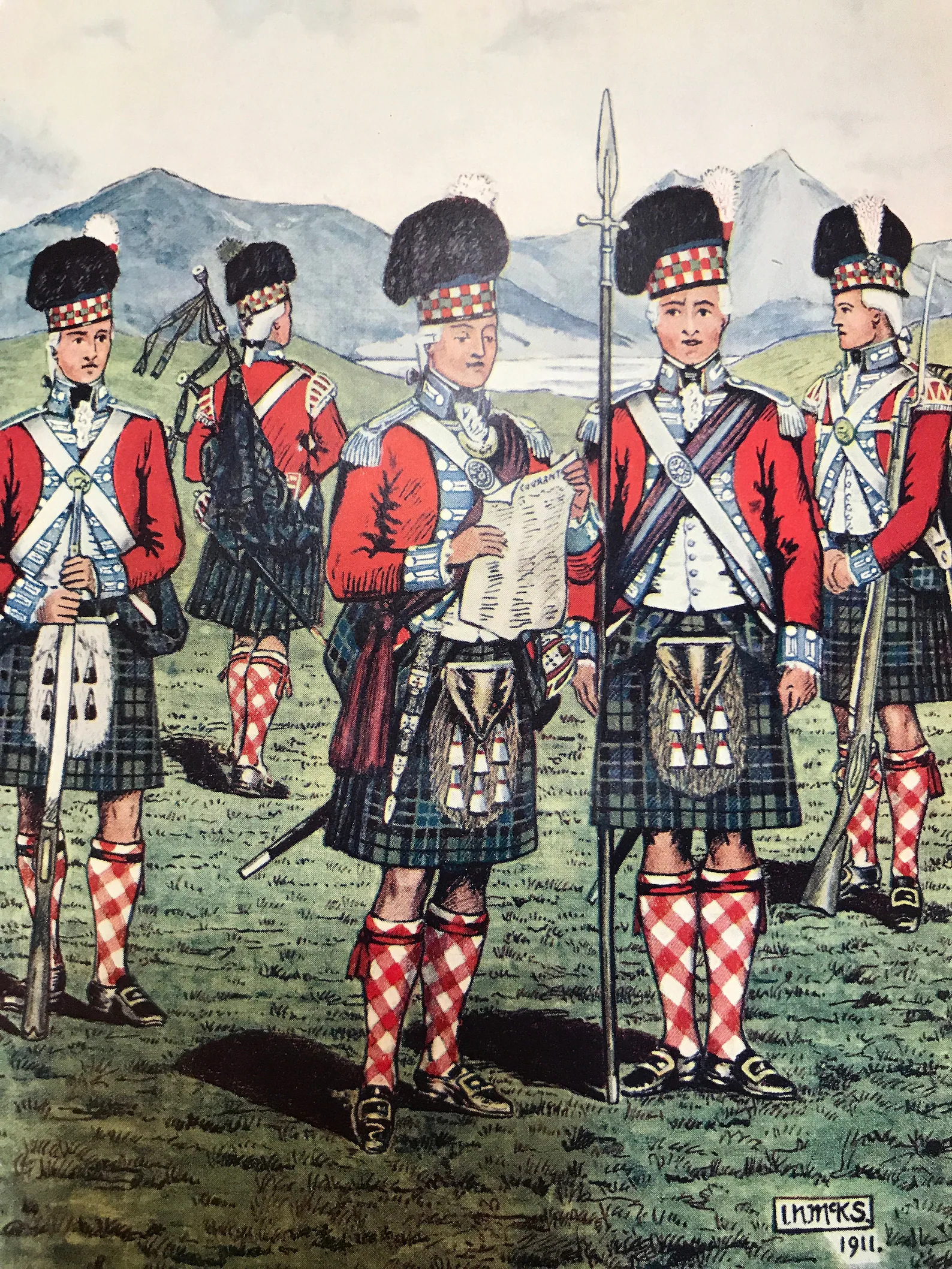
Private, bagpiper, officer, non-commissioned officer and private of the Reay Fencibles

Amongst other districts fixed on by government for raising fencible corps at the commencement of the French Revolutionary Wars, that of "Lord Reay's country" (as that region was then called), the residence of the Clan Mackay, was selected. The chief of that clan, the then Hugh, Lord Reay, being, from mental imbecility, incapable of acting, Hugh Mackay Bailie of Rosehall, was appointed colonel, and the late George Mackay of Bighouse, lieutenant-colonel of the Reay Fencibles ordered to be raised. Notwithstanding the unfortunate state of their chief the clan came readily forward, and in a few weeks a body of 800 Highlanders, of whom 700 had the word Mac prefixed to their names, was assembled.

In March 1795 the regiment was embodied by Sir Hector Munro at Fort George, whence it immediately proceeded to Ireland, where it soon acquired the confidence of Generals Lake and Nugent. The former was particularly attached to the Reay Fencibles, and, after the defeat of Castlebar, he frequently exclaimed, "If I had had my brave and honest Reays there, this would not have happened".

The only opportunity they had of proving their firmness in the unhappy service in which they were engaged was at the battle of Tara Hill, on 26 May 1798, where, in conjunction with two troops of Lord Fingall's, some cavalry and foot from the Kells and Navan yeomanry, three companies of the Reays, under Captain Hector Maclean, an experienced officer, who had served 37 years in the 42nd, attacked a large body of rebels, and drove them from their strong and elevated position, with a loss of about 400 killed and wounded. In this affair, the Reays had 26 men killed and wounded.

The regiment, whose conduct was most exemplary, returned to Scotland in 1802, and was disbanded at Stirling the same year. In dismissing the regiment Major-General Baillie took the "opportunity of expressing his highest approbation of the uniform good conduct of the regiment since it was embodied," reflecting "with pride and satisfaction on the many opportunities that occurred to evince the loyalty, good discipline, distinguished gallantry, and persevering attention of all ranks, to the good of the service".

=== Inverness-shire Fencibles (1794) ===
The Inverness-shire Fencibles (or Inverness Fencibles) were raised shortly after 21 November 1794 when letters of service were issued to Major John Baillie of Dunain to raise a fencible corps of 600 whose service should extend to the whole of Great Britain and Ireland. Major John Gordon Cumming of Pitlurg was appointed to the permanent post of lieutenant-colonel by Colonel Baillie, who had that privilege conferred on him.

The regiment was completed in October 1795, and was embodied at Inverness under the name of the Loyal Inverness Fencible Highlanders, though there were only about 350 Highlanders in the corps. The uniform was the full Highland garb, and it was observed that some young Welshmen (about 40), who had joined the ranks, were more partial to the plaid than the Lowlanders of Aberdeen and Perth.

The regiment was immediately ordered to Ireland, and with such haste that the men were despatched without clothing or arms, of which, however, they received a supply at Glasgow on their route. The regiment was actively employed during the rebellion, and conducted themselves in that unfortunate service with as much forbearance as circumstances would permit. Colonel Baillie died in 1797, and was succeeded as regimental commander by Lieutenant-Colonel John Gordon Cumming, who thus became the corps’ final colonel.

In compliment to the good behaviour of the corps its designation was changed, after the suppression of the rebellion, to the Duke of York's Royal Inverness-shire Highlanders. The establishment of the regiment was increased, and in 1801 the whole corps offered to extend its service to any part of the world. In March 1802 the regiment was disbanded at Stirling.

=== Fraser Fencibles (1794) ===
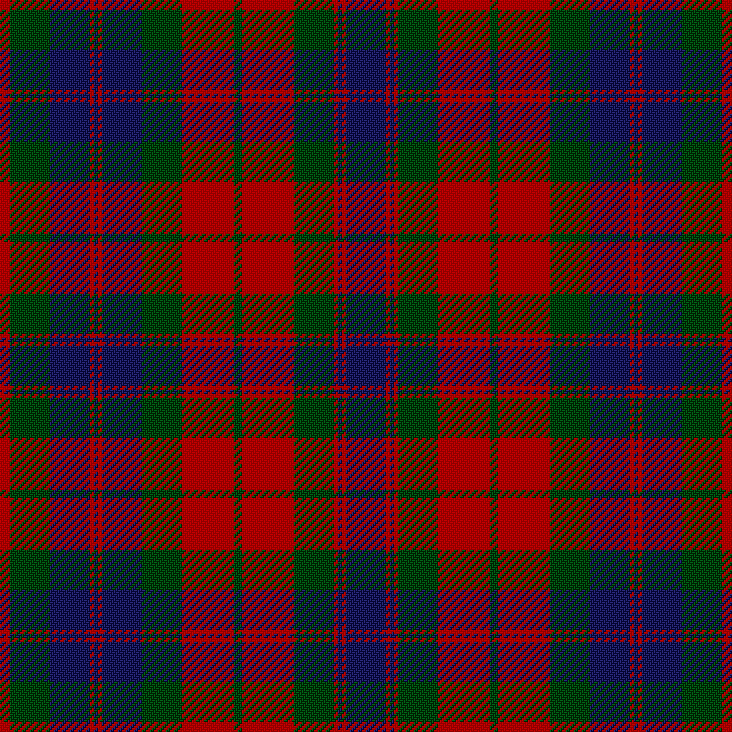
Uniform tartan of the Fraser Fencibles

In consequence of the advanced age of Archibald Fraser the chief of the Clan Fraser, (youngest son of the last Lord Lovat, and brother of Gen. Simon Fraser (1726–1782)) James Fraser of Belladrum, who had served under his chief in Canada during the Seven Years' War, was appointed to raise this regiment. It was completed in the spring of 1795, and was inspected and embodied at Inverness on 14 June same year. 300 of the men bore the name of Fraser, chiefly from the Aird and Stratherrick. With the exception of 30 Scottish Lowlanders and 18 English and Irish who had formerly served in the army, the rest of the corps were from the countries in the neighbourhood of these districts.

The regiment was ordered to Ireland, where it arrived on 1 August 1795. In November 1797, Simon Fraser, the younger of Lovat, was appointed colonel, in consequence of the resignation of Belladrum. The Fraser Fencibles fought at the battle of Castlebar, and had the other corps behaved like them on that occasion the result might have been different. They were the last to retreat. A Highland Fraser sentinel was desired by his friends "to retreat with them, but he heroically refused to quit his post, which was elevated, with some little steps leading to it. He loaded and fired five times successively, and killed a Frenchman at every shot; but before he could charge a sixth time, they rushed on him, [and] beat out his brains".

The general character of the corps was excellent; they had a high degree of the esprit de corps; were obedient, active, and trusty; gaining the entire confidence of the generals commanding, by whom they were always stationed in the most distracted districts, previous to and during the rebellion. Many attempts were made to corrupt them, but in vain; no man proved unfaithful. The men were not in general large, but active, well-made, and remarkable for steady marching, never leaving any stragglers, even on the quickest and longest march.

— Major Fraser of Newton.

This unit, also known as the Fraser Regiment, was disbanded at Glasgow in July 1802.

=== Glengarry Fencibles (1794) ===
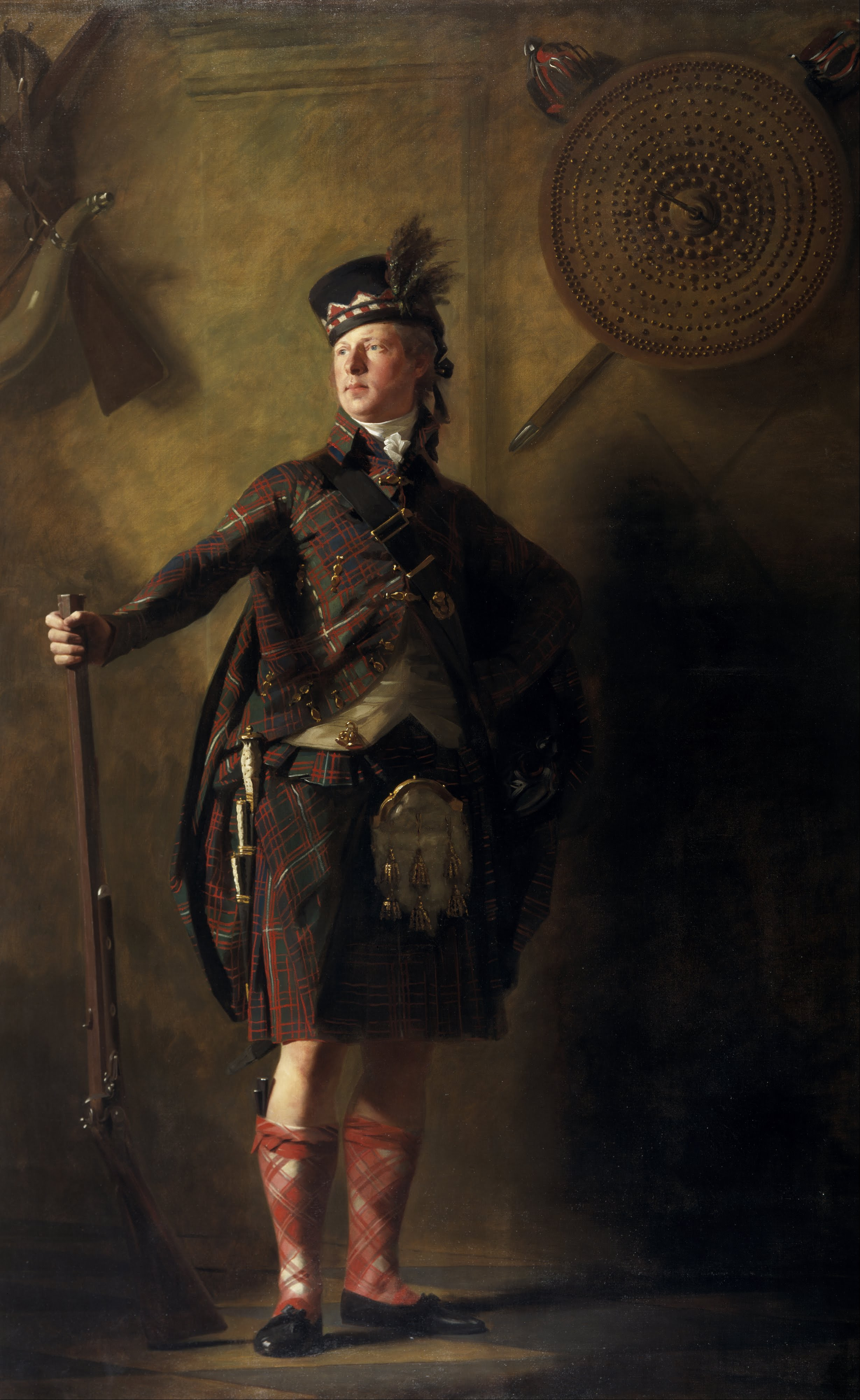
1812 portrait of Alexander Ranaldson MacDonell, the Glengarry Fencibles' colonel

The idea of raising the Glengarry Fencibles originated with the Rev. Alexander Macdonell, a Roman Catholic priest, who later became the first Roman Catholic Bishop of Kingston in Ontario, Canada. Some Glengarry Highlanders who due to the clearance of their land had taken passage on ship leaving the Isle of Harris to emigrate to America, but the ship had been wrecked and had put into Greenock in 1792. The intended emigrants were forced to disembark, and were left in the port destitute. Alexander Macdonell involved himself in their affairs and persuaded Glasgow business men to employ them while he acted as the Highlanders priest and interpreter (for they were Catholics in a predominantly Protestant town and spoke Gaelic not Scottish English).

For two years the business concerns in Glasgow for which Glengarry Highlanders worked continued to increase and prosper, but in the year 1794 trade received a sudden check, and the war with France almost put an end to the exportation of British manufactures to the Continent. The credit of the manufacturers was checked; their factories were almost at a standstill, and frequent bankruptcies ensued. The labouring classes were thrown out of employment, and amongst others the poor Highlanders. With little support from outside their immediate community, and totally ignorant of the English language, the latter became more helpless and destitute than any other group in Glasgow.

At this crisis Alexander Macdonell conceived the plan of getting these unfortunate Highlanders embodied as a Catholic corps in the service of the government, with the then young chief Macdonell of Glengarry. Having assembled a meeting of the Catholics at Fort Augustus in February, 1794, a loyal address was drawn up to the king, offering to raise a Catholic corps under the command of the young chieftain, who, together with John Fletcher of Dunans, proceeded as a deputation to London with the address, which was most graciously received by King George III. Their former employers in Glasgow furnished them with the most ample and favourable testimonials of the good conduct of the Highlanders during the time they had been in their works, and strongly recommended that they should be employed in the service of their country.

Letters of service were accordingly issued in August 1794 to Alexander Ranaldson MacDonell to raise the Glengarry Fencible regiment as a Catholic corps, and of which he was appointed the colonel. Though contrary to the then existing law, Alexander Macdonell was gazetted as chaplain to the regiment. The Glengarry Fencibles were a handsome body of men, and more than one-half were from the estate of Glengarry. Some of the fencible regiments having refused to extend their services to England, and two of them (Breadalbane and Grant) having mutinied, in consequence of the attempt to induce them to march into England; the Glengarry Fencibles, by the persuasion of their chaplain, offered to extend their services to any part of Great Britain or Ireland, or even to the islands of Jersey and Guernsey. This offer was very acceptable to the government, as it formed a precedent to all fencible corps raised after this period. The regiment was embodied in June, 1795, and was soon afterwards moved to Guernsey, where it remained until the summer of 1798.

The Glengarry Fencibles volunteered to provide a garrison for the Îles Saint-Marcouf, which the Royal Navy occupied in July 1795. However, the French captured Captain Sidney Smith, who had captured the islands and was in charge of a coastal flotilla that operated from there, and his secretary John Wesley Wright. The idea of placing the fencibles on the island then fell by the wayside. This would mean that the fencibles lost the opportunity to participate in the battle of the Îles Saint-Marcouf, a lopsided victory in which the British repelled a French attempt to retake the islands.

In the summer of 1798 the Glengarry Fencibles moved to Ireland. On landing at Ballyhack, County Wexford, they marched to Waterford, and thence to New Ross the same day. At Waterford an amusing incident occurred, which afforded no small surprise to some, and no slight ridicule to others, whilst, at the same time, it showed the simplicity of the Highlanders, and their naivety of the ways of the world. The soldiers who received billet-money on their entrance into the town, returned it upon their being ordered to march the same evening to New Ross, for the purpose of reinforcing General Johnson, who was surrounded, and in a manner besieged by the rebels. The Glengarry Fencibles were actively employed in this service, and so well pleased was Lord Cornwallis, the lord-lieutenant of Ireland, with the conduct of the corps, that he advised the government to augment the regiment; but this augmentation did not take place. The regiment returned to Scotland in 1802, and was disbanded along with the other fencible corps.

After their discharge, the Glengarry Highlanders were as destitute as ever. Their chaplain, struck with their forlorn condition, proceeded to London, and entered into a negotiation with the government, in the hope of procuring assistance to enable them to emigrate to Upper Canada (what is today southern Ontario). The ministry were opposed to the plan, but offered to settle the Highlanders in the island of Trinidad, then just ceded to the Crown of Great Britain. Alexander Macdonell, however, persevered in his design, and the Prime Minister, Henry Addington, procured for him an order with the sign-manual to the lieutenant-governor of Upper Canada, to grant two hundred acres of land to every one of the Highlanders who should arrive in the province.

As soon as it was known that this order had been given by the colonial secretary, the Highland landlords took the alarm, as they considered that it would have the effect of enticing from the country their vassals and dependents. John Macpherson, Sir Archibald Macdonald, lord-chief baron of the exchequer in England, Charles Grant, one of the directors of the East India company, and M. P. for Inverness-shire, with the other gentlemen connected with the Highlands, and even Francis, Earl of Moira, then commander-in-chief in North Britain (then a fashionable designation for Scotland), endeavoured to dissuade the chaplain from his purpose, and promised to procure a pension for him if he would separate himself from the Highlanders; but neither their persuasions, nor those of the Prince of Wales, who was induced to interfere, and who offered a grant of waste lands to the intending emigrants in the county of Cornwall, could induce the chaplain to forgo his resolution.

The greater part of the Glengarry Fencibles accordingly emigrated with their wives and families to Upper Canada, and settled in a district to which they gave the name of their native glen (now Glengarry County, Ontario); and to follow out the parallel, every head of a family named his plantation after the name of the farm he had possessed in Glengarry. During the War of 1812, they gave a proof that their allegiance to Britain was not impaired in their adopted country, by enrolling themselves along with other emigrants and the sons of emigrants, in a corps for the defence of the province, under their old designation of Glengarry Light Infantry Fencibles. The unit lineage continues in the Stormont, Dundas and Glengarry Highlanders.

=== Caithness Legion (1794) ===
The Caithness Legion was raised by Sir Benjamin Dunbar of Hempriggs. When embodied, it was moved to Ireland, returned from that country in 1802, and was disbanded the same year.

=== Perthshire Fencibles (1794) ===
The Perthshire Fencibles was raised by William Robertson of Lude, who was appointed its colonel. Though designated the Perthshire Fencibles, it contained but very few Highlanders.

=== Argyle Fencibles (1794) – Second Battalion ===
The Argyle Fencibles was raised by Colonel Henry M. Clavering (a Major who transferred from the 98th Foot), to whom the command was given. Captain John Campbell who was on half-pay previously of the late independent companies was promoted to be Lieutenant-Colonel of the regiment. The regiment was moved to Ireland where it was stationed until its return to Scotland in 1802, when it was disbanded.

=== Ross-shire Fencibles (1794) ===
The Ross-shire Fencibles was raised on 20 November 1794 by Major Colin Mackenzie of Mountgerald, who was appointed colonel. The regiment was small in point of numbers, and when disbanded, was as strong and efficient as when embodied, not one man having died during its service. It was disbanded in 1799.

=== Argyle Fencibles (1798) – Third Battalion ===
The Argyle Fencibles was raised on 15 June 1798 by Archibald Macneil of Colonsay, who was appointed colonel of the regiment. The name of Argyle, like that of the Perthshire Highlanders, was rather a misnomer, as very few Argyleshire men entered the regiment. The service of this regiment extending to any part of Europe, it was sent to Gibraltar in 1800, where it remained in garrison until the peace of Amiens (1802), when it was ordered home, and disbanded on 3 July 1802.

=== Clan-Alpine Fencibles (1798) ===
In December, Colonel Alexander Macgregor Murray received instructions to raise a regiment of Highland Fencibles, of which he was appointed the colonel. (Note: Probably: Colonel Alexander MacGregor Murray (25 August 1746 – 18 July 1823 (Macfarlane 2004, Col. Alexander MacGregor (Murray))) He accordingly raised a body of 765 men, whose service was to extend to any part of Europe. In May, 1799, the men were assembled at Stirling and inspected by Lieutenant-general Sir Ralph Abercromby.

In consequence of an arrangement similar to that made with other fencible corps of this description, by which one of the field-officers was to have permanent and progressive army rank, Captain Alexander Macgregor Murray of the 90th Foot regiment, son of Colonel Macgregor Murray, was appointed major. (Note: Probably:Major-General Alexander Murray MacGregor (1778–1827) (Macfarlane 2004, Col. Alexander MacGregor (Murray)).) In the event of any of the men entering the regular army, their services in the Clan-Alpine regiment were to be reckoned as if they had served from the first in the line.

In the 1800, after the regiment had been moved to Ireland, orders were issued to augment it to 1,050. This increase was effected, notwithstanding the great and recent drains from the population, particularly of the Highlands. Shortly after this augmentation, two detachments entered the regular army, and it therefore became necessary to recruit again. Of 1,230 men who entered the regiment from first to last, about 780 were Highlanders, 30 English and Irish, and the remainder Scottish Lowlanders.

The regiment returned from Ireland in 1802, and was disbanded on 24 July at Stirling.

=== Lochaber Fencibles (1799) ===
The influence which the family of Lochiel possessed in the Highlands was not extinguished by the exile of Gentle Lochie, the chief of the clan Cameron, from his native country for his part in The 'Forty-Five', as was fully evinced when the estates of the family of Lochiel were restored to Donald Cameron of Lochiel, the 22nd clan chief. In consequence of the strong attachment which his clan still retained for the family, he was appointed colonel of a fencible corps to be raised in Scotland, with the designation of the Lochaber Fencible Highlanders.

The clan, and indeed all Lochaber, immediately responded to the call of the chief, and in a very short time upwards of 560 Highlanders were enrolled. The number of recruits was increased to 800 by the exertions of officers in other parts of the country, and the whole were assembled at Falkirk in May, 1799. As some of the Highlanders afterwards volunteered into regiments of the line, others were raised to supply the vacancies thus occasioned, so that the total number of Highlanders who entered the Lochaber Fencibles, was 1,740.

In 1800, the regiment was moved to Ireland; but its military duty was short. It returned to Scotland in 1802, and was disbanded at Linlithgow in the month of July of that year.

=== Regiment of the Isles, or MacDonald Fencibles (1799) ===
The Regiment of the Isles was raised by Sir Alexander, Lord Macdonald on his estates in the isles, having, on his own application, obtained permission from George III for that purpose. It was embodied at Inverness on 4 June 1799 by Major-general Leith Hay. This was an excellent body of young men, their average age being twenty-two years, "a period of life the best calculated to enter upon military service; not too young to suffer from, or incapable of supporting the hardships and fatigues peculiar to the profession; nor too old to admit of the mental and personal habits of the soldier being moulded to the moral and military restraints which the profession renders necessary".

The regiment was moved to England, where it was employed to put down a strike amongst the seamen of Whitehaven, to raise their wages, by preventing the vessels from leaving the harbour. No force, however, was necessary, as the sailors had a salutary dread of the Highlanders; and the officers of the MacDonald Fencibles, persuaded the seamen to end their strike, and to return to their ships.

In 1802, the regiment was marched to Fort George, and disbanded.

=== Ross and Cromarty Rangers (1799) ===
The Ross and Cromarty Rangers, was embodied in June 1799 and commanded by Colonel Lewis Mackenzie, younger of Scatwell. Though the terms of its service were to extend to Europe, it remained in Scotland.

In the year 1801 there was an unfortunate incident that involved this regiment when celebrations of King George III's birthday got out of control. On the evening of the King's birthday, a crowd of people, principally young men, collected in the main street of Aberdeen, which coincidentally was the regiment's guardhouse. The young men commenced their usual pastimes of throwing squibs, firecrackers, dead cats, etc. In their high spirits they assaulted the guard when it was called out of the guardhouse to protect the property. Soldiers from the barracks, without order, rushed to help the guard as they feared that their comrades would be overpowered and murdered. Shortly after the soldiers arrived officers joined them. Someone gave the order "fire" and two of the mob were killed, and others wounded. No magistrate had arrived to read the riot act so the killings were unlawful. There was a formal investigation, but as no one could identify who had given the order, two officers, two sergeants, and some privates were tried in the Court of Judiciary in Edinburgh. No one was found guilty for the killings, and the matter was dropped.

The regiment was disbanded shortly after the peace of 1802.

=== Macleod Fencibles (1799) ===
Macleod Fencibles was the last fencible regiment raised in the Highlands. It was inspected and embodied at Elgin by Major-General Leith Hay, in the month of June, under the designation of the Princess Charlotte of Wales's, or Macleod Highlanders. The command of the corps was given to John Macleod of Colbecks. The regiment was immediately sent to Ireland, where it remained until 1802, when, having embarked for England, it was disbanded at Tynemouth barracks in the month of June.

== Assessment ==
There were in total 26 battalions in the Highland Fencible Corps. The main military action in which the Highland Fencibles were engaged was in the Irish Rebellion of 1798. During the rebellion some regiments performed well, while others did not. Exceptionally, the Sutherland Fencibles took part in an action against the crew of a French privateer at Portlethen in 1780.

The limited nature of service in the Highland Fencibles was in some respects a disadvantage; but perhaps this limitation, and the certainty of not being exposed to dangers from climate, the sea, or the enemy, induced many to enlist who would have hesitated if these risks had been the immediate consequences of their becoming soldiers. However the Highland Fencibles furnished a most excellent and seasonable nursery of men for regiments of the line. The 72nd Foot regiment was in a few months filled up from 200 to 800 men by fencible volunteers. Upwards of 350 men volunteered from the Clan Alpines into different regiments; 200 men of the Caithness Highlanders joined the 79th Foot and 92nd Foot; and so of the others.

Contemporary commentators such as David Stewart considered it a matter of regret, that during that most trying period of the French Revolutionary Wars, so many efficient regiments were so fettered by their terms of engagement, that they could not be employed on those important occasions where they would have formed a very seasonable aid, and where their military qualities could have been exerted to the utmost advantage.

For officers, the fencible regiments, like the militias, presented both advantages and disadvantages. For many young men, those formations were a kind of stepping-stone to get into the regular army. Others, again, who passed too many years in them, gained no rank, spent their daily pay, and acquired little professional knowledge, beyond the parade and drill exercise; and when, at the end of six, eight, or ten years, they thought of looking out for some permanent means of subsistence, or some military commission that might secure them rank and a future provision, they found themselves to have no more seniority than the first day they entered the service.

== See also ==
- List of British fencible regiments, includes Scottish Lowland and island fencible regiments
