= Lewis Mackenzie, younger of Scatwell =

Colonel Lewis Mackenzie, younger of Scatwell (died 1810), was a British soldier during the Napoleonic Wars.

== Biography ==
Lewis Mackenzie was the son of Sir Roderick Mackenzie of Scatwell, 4th Baronet and Catherine, daughter of Sir James Colquhoun of Luss, 1st Baronet.

The Ross and Cromarty Rangers, a fencible regiment was embodied in June 1799 and commanded by Colonel Mackenzie. Though the terms of its service were to extend to Europe, it remained in Scotland. It was disbanded shortly after the peace of 1802. He died in 1807, (he did not survive his father who died in 1811).

== Family ==
On 22 February 1794 Mackenzie married Grace, daughter of Thomas Lockhart.
