= John Macleod of Colbecks =

British soldier of the Napoleonic Wars (1761–1823)

- Born: 1761
- Died: 1823 (aged 61–62); Bury Street, St. James', London
- Spouse: Jane MacLeod (m. 1782)
- Children: Barlow Macleod; 5 daughters (including Susan and Margaret)
- Military career
- Allegiance: United Kingdom of Great Britain and Ireland
- Rank: Colonel
- Commands: Princess Charlotte of Wales Loyal Fencible Highlanders
- Conflicts: Napoleonic Wars

Colonel John Macleod of Colbecks (1761–1823) was a British soldier during the Napoleonic Wars. He was a son of Donald Macleod tacksman of Balallan in the Isle of Lewis and Jane the daughter of Malcolm Macleod 10th of Raasay. (Note: The grandfather of the subject of this biography is described as “Donald of Lewis” he had a son John, who bought an estate called Colbecks in Jamaica where he ran a successful plantation. On his return to Britain he was known as John MacLeod of Colbecks and on 17 March 1762 he registered arms as the representative of the MacLeods of Lewis. In his declaration he claimed to be heir-at-law of Roderick, last Baron of the Lewes. His first wife was Janet, daughter of Malcolm MacLeod of Raasay and widow of Iain Dubh MacKinnon.)

== Biography ==
The Princess Charlotte of Wales or MacLeod Loyal Fencible Highlanders, as they were called, were raised by MacLeod, who was appointed as a Colonel in 1799. This was the last fencible regiment raised in the Highlands. It was inspected and embodied at Elgin, by Major-General Leith Hay in June 1799, and was sent at once to Ireland for active service. After three years in that country, the regiment embarked for England and was reduced at Tynemouth Barracks in June 1802. This does not mean that the regiment was disbanded; it may have existed for some years longer, in which case the final disbandment would have taken place on 7 January 1809.

During the 1810s, the Macleod family lived at Charlton Kings near Cheltenham in England, and were active in the social scene in the city. The composer Charles Edward Horn (1786–1849) knew them and dedicated Daughter of Love to "Mrs Macleod [an] aunt [of] the Countess of Loundoum, [and] a very delightful musician and singer".

Macleod died in 1823, as the following notice from Blackwood's Magazine of that year shows: "In Bury Street, St. James’, London, Colonel John MacLeod of Colbeck. His dead was the last of a branch of an ancient and distinguished clan".

== Family ==
In 1782, MacLeod married Jane (or Jean) the daughter of John MacLeod of Raasay. They had one son, Barlow, and five daughters. Barlow and the four elder daughters died unmarried. The fifth child, Susan, married to Mr. Andrews and had two sons: Hastings (buried at Canterbury) and Greville. A daughter Margaret (died 1823) married to John Grant (1742-1793), the 1st laird of Kilgraston, with no issue.

== Legacy ==
The piobaireachd (bagpipe music) Lament for MacLeod of Colbecks was probably written for Colonel John Macleod of Colbecks on his death in 1823.

In 1906, there was in the possession of Mr. M. C. MacLeod, Edinburgh, a presentation sword, bearing the following inscription:

Presented to Col. John MacLeod of Colbeck, late Col.
Commandant of the Princess Charlotte of Wales
Loyal Fencible Highlanders, —7th Jan. 1809.
