= Elgin's Regiment of Fencible Infantry =

Elgin's Regiment of Fencible Infantry or Elgin's Fencible Highlanders was raised in November 1794.

Major Thomas, Earl of Elgin, from the 12th Foot was Colonel of this fencible regiment with the permanent army rank of Lieutenant-Colonel. John Hepburn Belches was appointed to be a Lieutenant-Colonel in the regiment and Patrick Tyler to be a Major.

The regiment, was embodied in the Lowlands on 28 November 1794. It contained about 300 men from the Highlands. The regiment was posted to Ireland and was decommissioned on 15 October 1802.
