= Archibald Macneil of Colonsay =

Scottish laird

Colonel Archibald Macneil 5th laird of Colonsay (fl. 1773–1805), was a Scottish laird who served as an officer in the British Army during the Napoleonic Wars. (Note: Also Archibald McNeill of Colonsay)

== Biography ==
Archibald McNeill was the son of Donald McNeill, 3rd Laird of Colonsay (died 1773) and Grizel McNeill of Belfast. He succeeded as Laird of Colonsay on 12 February 1773. He married in 1796, at Newtown Forbes, Co. Longford, Ireland, the Lady Georgina Anne Forbes, (referred to in his will as 'Anne'), born 7 July 1772, daughter of George Forbes, 5th Earl of Granard, Co. Longford, Ireland and Georgiana Augusta Berkeley, his wife. In earlier accounts of his life, it has been generally stated that there were no children of this marriage, but later research has revealed that there were two; a son and a daughter.

The Argyll Fencibles of 1798 was raised by McNeill, who was appointed colonel of the regiment. The name "Argyll", like that of the Perthshire Highlanders, was rather a misnomer, as very few Argyll men entered the regiment. The service of this regiment extending to any part of Europe, it was sent to Gibraltar in 1800, where it remained in garrison until the peace of Amiens (1802), when it was ordered home, and disbanded.

Archibald lived on Colonsay, Argyll, and is "remembered as a popular laird", although much emigration to America and Canada occurred during his tenure.

McNeill died on Colonsay in 1808, and was succeeded in the estate by his cousin John Macneill. Sources vary on the reason why John MacNeill succeeded. William Anderson states he bought it (Anderson 1867, p. 53), while Iain Moncreiffe states it was "a special family financial arrangement, afterwards typical of the Colonsay McNeill succession" (Moncreiffe 1967, p. 83). However, the reality was that, in the course of his chequered career Archibald ran up many debts, unaware that his cousin John (Archibald's manager on Colonsay) had been quietly buying them up. Eventually John presented the bills and asked for them to be redeemed - thus forcing Archibald to 'sell' him Colonsay 'at a certain, adequate price'.

Archibald suffered from epilepsy. Archibald made his will on 27 February 1808 and it was proved in London on 28 January 1809. He died on Colonsay and the chieftainship passed to his cousin John. After Archibald's death, Lady Ann moved to Ireland and married the Reverend Anthony Hastings.

== Family ==
McNeill married Georgina, daughter of George, 5th Earl of Granard.
