= Battle of Tara Hill =

Battle during the Irish Rebellion of 1798

Coordinates: 53.5775°N 6.6119°W

Battle of Hill of Tara
- Part of the Irish Rebellion
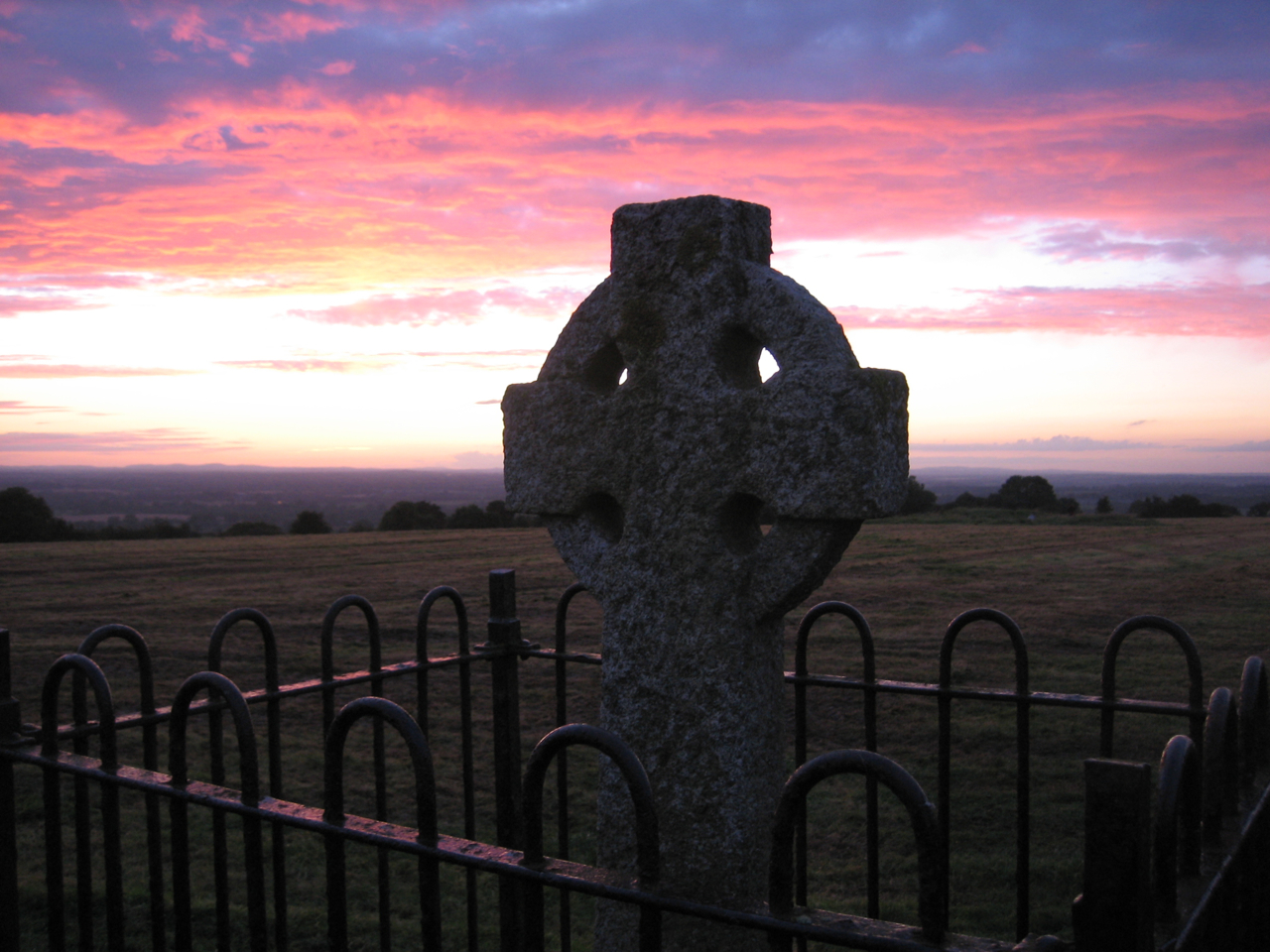
- The cross at the site of the battle.
Date	26 May 1798
Location	Hill of Tara, County Meath
Result	British victory: Ending of rebellion in Meath.

Belligerents
(Kingdom of Great Britain) Great Britain: (Kingdom of Ireland) British Ireland	United Irishmen

Commanders and leaders
Captain Blanche	Unknown

Strength
700	4,000

Casualties and losses
30 killed	400 killed

The Battle of Tara Hill was fought on the evening of 26 May 1798 between British forces and Irish rebels involved in the Irish Rebellion of 1798, resulting in a heavy defeat for the rebels and the end of the rebellion in County Meath.

== Background ==
Following the outbreak of the rebellion signaled in Meath by the prearranged signal of the seizing of a mail coach near Turvey hill, road blocks were posted on the Navan road United Irishmen and rebels in Meath began to assemble at the hill of Tara. Tara was chosen as it provided strategic control of road access to the capital Dublin and cultural significance as the former seat of the high kings of Ireland. Between 4,000 and 7,000 rebels gathered at the hill. There were incidents of violent encounters throughout the countryside as rallying rebels made their way to Tara from the outbreak of the rebellion on the 23rd to the day of the battle on the 26th.

== Battle of Tara ==
Picking up yeomanry reinforcements along the way, the combined fencible, yeomanry and militia forces formed up at the bottom of the hill to attack the rebels who had established a large camp on the hill. The lack of any cannon or cavalry placed the rebels at a great disadvantage despite their numbers. Disciplined volley fire and flanking cavalry action combined with withering grapeshot delivered from a 6-pounder cannon drove the rebels to within graveyard walls at the summit. There at dusk, the rebels made their last stand on the hill until a final grenadier assault finished them.

The loss to the fencibles, yeomanry and militia was minimal. However rebel casualties have estimates running from several hundred to several thousand dead and many wounded. Many bodies were removed during the night of the 26th and 350 dead were counted still lying on the battlefield the following day. Witnesses to the burial recollect many more bodies of those rebels who died of their wounds during the night being collected from the surrounding countryside in carts. It was noted by the witnesses that the bodies were universally disembowelled by the victors. The dead were buried in a mass grave marked by the Lia Fail standing stone which was moved to mark the burial site. The defeat effectively ended the United Irishmen's rising in Meath.
