= William Robertson of Lude =

British Army general

General William Robertson of Lude (died 1820) was an officer in the British Army who served in the army during the American War of Independence, the French Revolutionary, and the Napoleonic wars.

== Biography ==
Robertson was the son of James Robertson of Lude (1736–1802) and Aldie, daughter of Robert Nairne and Jean Mecer. (Note: John Robertson of Lude died when his son James Robertson of Lude (1736–1802) was only 4 years old. James served heir to his father in 1758. He married his first cousin, Margaret Mercer of Aldie, eldest daughter of Robert Nairne and Jean Mercer, heiress of the ancient family of Aldie and Meikleour, in the counties of Kinross and Perth. They and had six sons, of whom five entered the army, two were killed in actions, one at the battle of Seringapatam, and the other in India, and one died in the West Indies (Anderson 1867, p. 283).) He entered the British Army at 15. He fought in the American War of Independence, and in Holland, and also at the taking of St. Lucia, and several of the islands of the West Indies.

In 1794 he raised a regiment of infantry called the Perthshire Fencibles. In 1800 he accompanied the Ferrol Expedition to the coast of Spain under Sir James Murray Pulteney. In 1804 a corps of volunteers. In 1805 he was appointed to the army staff in Scotland, and served in that capacity, as a commanding officer in the Channel Islands and in various districts in England, until the end of 1813, when he was promoted to the rank of lieutenant-general. He died in 1820.

== Family ==
In 1802 Robertson married Margaret, eldest daughter of George Haldane, 18th of Gleneagles, Perthshire, and Margaret, eldest daughter of James Drummond, Viscount of Strathallan. They had 2 sons, James Alexander (who served in the 82nd Foot) and a younger son who died as an infant in 1814. Robertson married secondly Menzies of Culdares. They had no children.
