= Alexander Leith Hay =

British Army officer

General Alexander Leith Hay DL JP
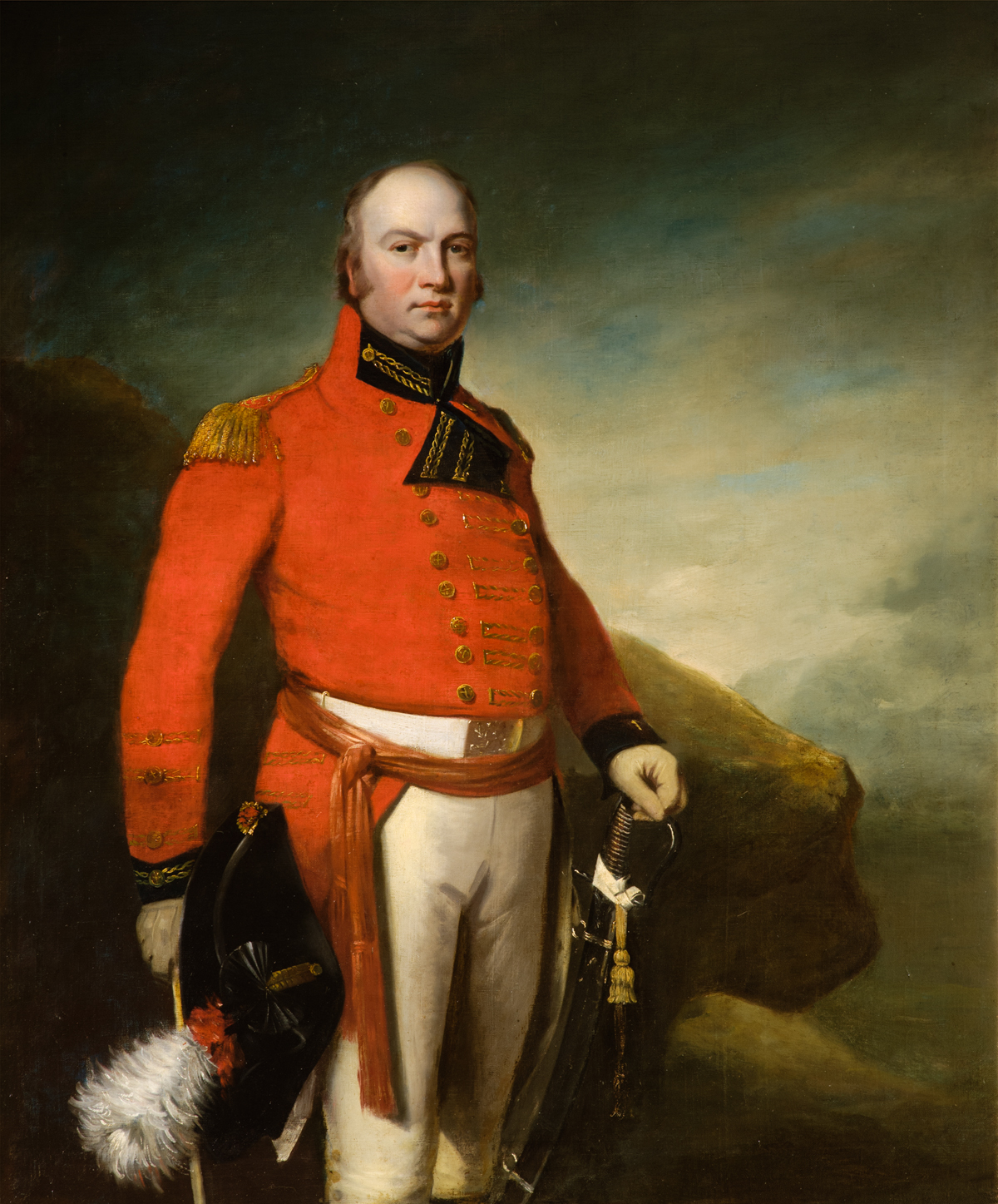
- Birth name: Alexander Leith
- Born: 21 December 1758 Aberdeen, Scotland
- Died: 16 May 1838 (aged 79)

General Alexander Leith Hay (born Alexander Leith; 21 December 1758 – 16 May 1838) was a British Army officer.

== Life ==
Hay was born in Aberdeen on 21 December 1758, the second son of John Leith (1731–1763) of Leith Hall, Aberdeenshire, and his wife, Harriet (d. 1780), daughter and heir of Alexander Steuart of Auchluncart.

He was appointed a lieutenant in the 7th Dragoons immediately on his birth, captain 1768, and colonel in the army 1794. Upon the death of Andrew Hay in 1789 he inherited the estate of Rannes, Aberdeenshire, and assumed the additional title Hay of Rannes, being descended from that family through his paternal grandmother.

On 1 October in the same year he was gazetted colonel of a regiment raised by himself and called by his name. He was promoted to be major-general 1796, lieutenant-general 1803 and full general 1838. He was deputy lieutenant and justice of the peace for the county of Aberdeenshire.

== Family ==
He married in 1784 Mary, daughter of Charles Forbes of Ballogie; she died in 1824. The couple had two sons and four daughters, including their eldest son, Andrew Leith Hay. Another son, John James Leith, was a Rear-Admiral in the Royal Navy and the father of Alexander Forbes-Leith, 1st Baron Leith of Fyvie. Leith died in August 1838.
