= Fencibles =

Type of historical British military unit

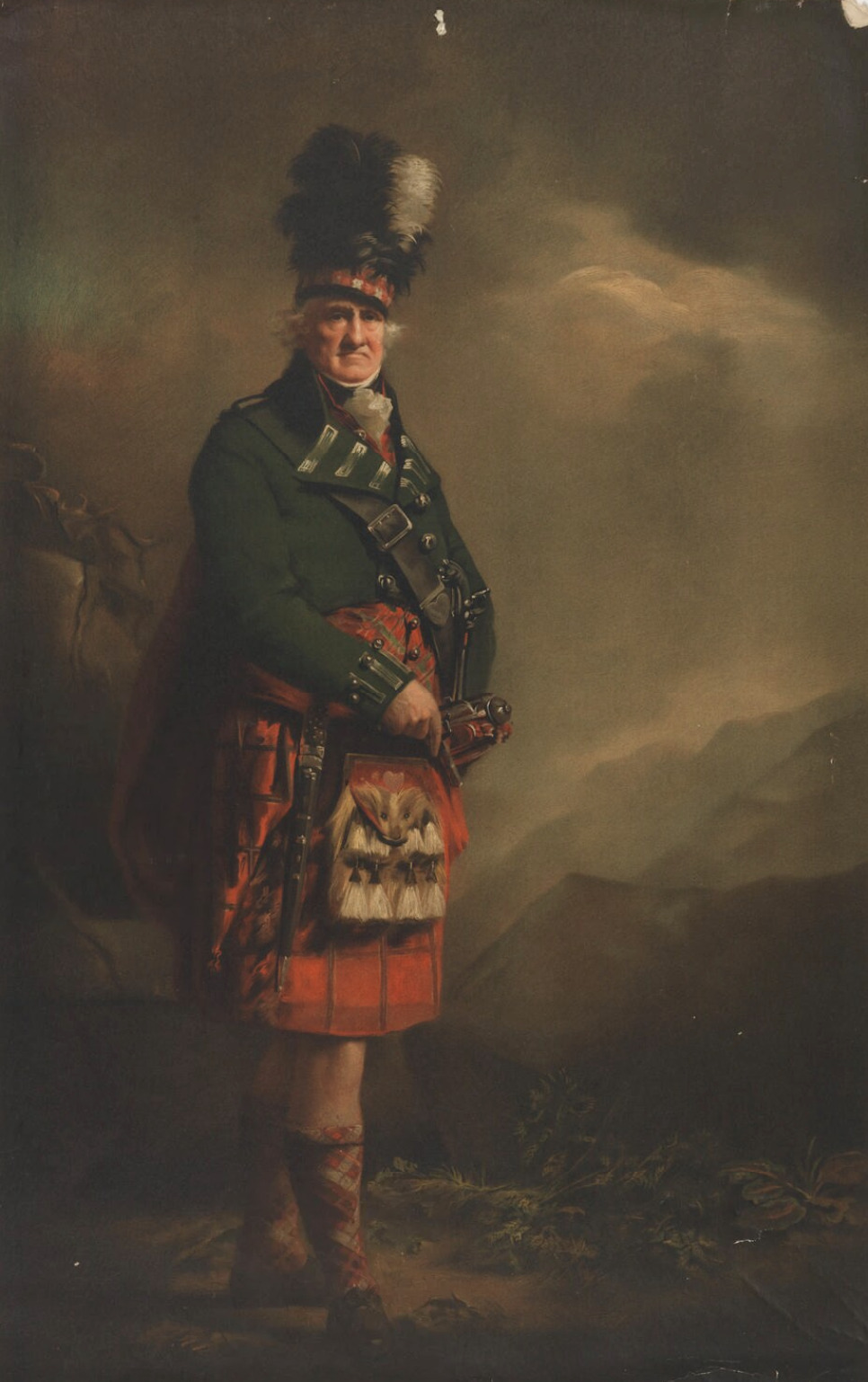
c. 1810 portrait of a lieutenant colonel of the Breadalbane Fencibles

Fencibles (from the word defencible) were military units raised in the British Empire during the 18th and 19th centuries for the purpose of defending against foreign invasion during times of war. The first fencible units were raised in Scotland in 1759 during the Seven Years' War as the Scottish Militia was not then active over concerns stemming from the Jacobite risings. In contrast to the militia, Fencible units were regular troops who could be stationed anywhere in the British Isles and whose officers were appointed by the Crown, though like the militia were generally exempt from overseas service.

Fencible units were again raised during the American War of Independence and the French Revolutionary and Napoleonic Wars, playing a major role in the suppression of the Irish Rebellion of 1798. During the French Revolutionary and Napoleonic Wars, naval militia forces known as the Sea Fencibles and River Fencibles were raised for coastal defence duties. Several fencible units were raised for service in Canada and fought in the War of 1812.

== History ==
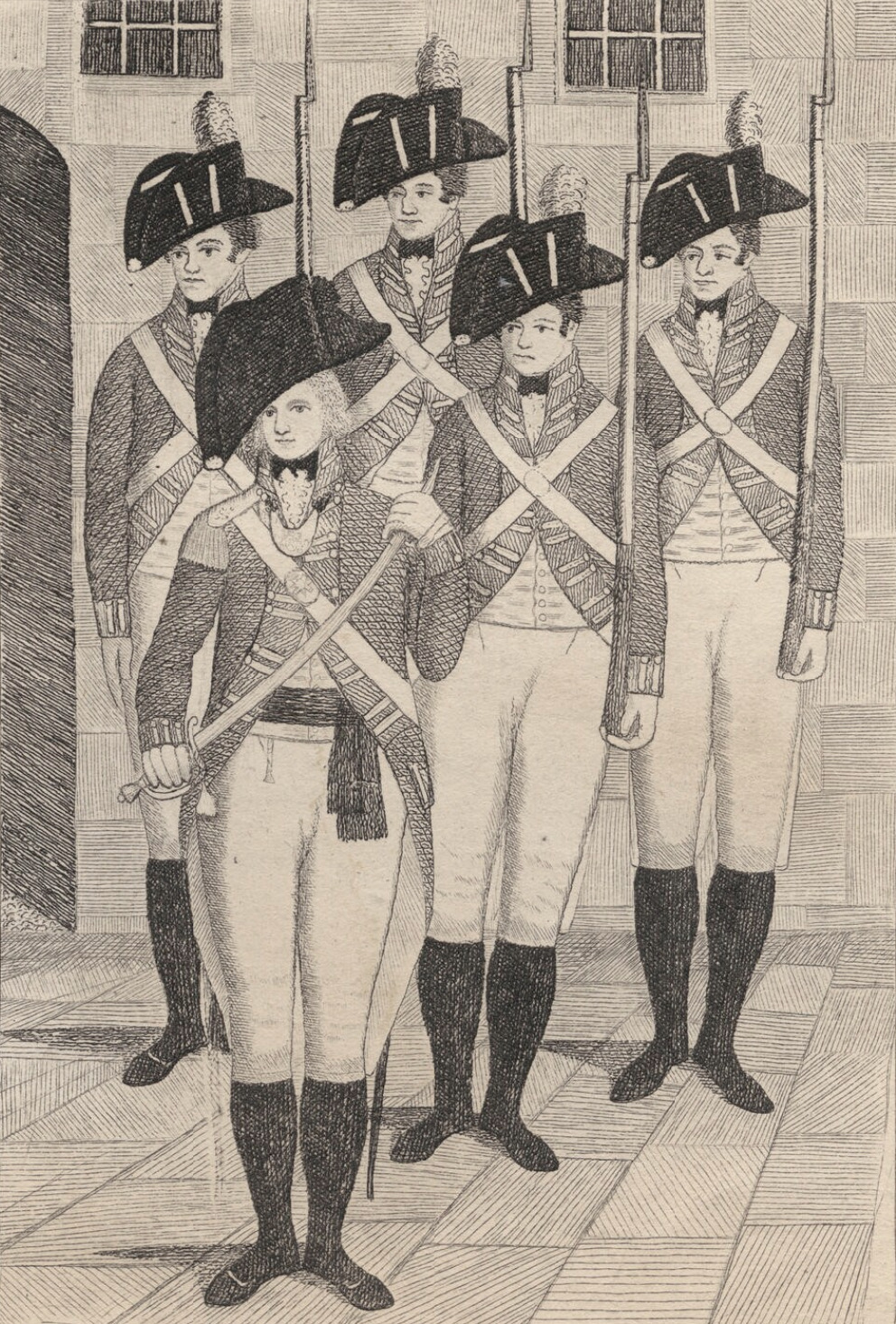
1795 engraving of an ensign and four privates of the Hopetoun Fencibles

The first regiments were raised in Scotland in 1759. In England militia regiments were raised for internal defence in the absence of the regular army; but it was not deemed prudent to extend the system to Scotland, the inhabitants of which, it was supposed, could not yet be safely entrusted with arms because of The 'Fifteen' and The 'Forty-Five' rebellions. Groundless as the reasons for this caution undoubtedly were in regard to the Lowlands, it would certainly have been hazardous at a time when the Stuarts and their adherents were still plotting a restoration to have armed the clans. Unlike the militia regiments which were raised by ballot, the Fencibles were to be raised by the ordinary mode of recruiting, and like the regiments of the line, the officers were to be appointed, and their commissions signed by the king.

Most fencible regiments had no liability for overseas service however there were exceptions. Ireland while not united with the Kingdom of Great Britain until 1801 was the destination for several British fencible regiments during the Rebellion of 1798 where they fought in some pitched battles. The 3rd Argyllshire Regiment, who like some other fencible regiments had terms of service that extended to any part of Europe, garrisoned Gibraltar (as did Banffshire Fencibles, 2nd Argyllshire Fencibles, and the Prince of Wales Own Fencibles) The Dumbarton Fencibles Regiment was raised in Scotland, garrisoned Guernsey, fought in Ireland, and a detachment escorted prisoners to Prussia. The Ancient Irish Fencibles were sent to Egypt where they took part in the operations against the French in 1801. Fencible regiments tended to be less effective than regular troops for military duties; with problems of lack of education and vulnerability to disease. In Ireland, fencibles would take part in inter-regimental brawls and attacks on regular army soldiers. Some regiments of fencibles, however, were noted for exceptional service.

== Timeline ==
=== Highland Fencibles ===
The Scottish Highlands supplied fencible regiments for most of the second half of the 18th century. The first regiment raised was the Argyle Fencibles in 1759 and the last was the MacLeod Fencibles in 1779. In all over 20 regiments were created, although they were not all in existence at the same time. Some Highland fencibles regiments saw action in the Irish Rebellion of 1798, while other performed garrison and policing duties in Britain, Ireland, the Channel Islands and Gibraltar.

=== American Revolutionary War ===
The Royal Fencible Americans was a Loyalist unit raised by the British in Nova Scotia in 1775, that successfully withstood an attack by Patriot forces under Jonathan Eddy at the Battle of Fort Cumberland.

=== Irish Rebellion of 1798 ===
Fencibles were raised for the entirety of the Irish Rebellion.

=== French Revolutionary and Napoleonic Wars ===
Fencible units were raised in the United Kingdom and Isle of Man during the early years of the war. This included not only land regiments but also the Sea Fencibles (raised in 1798 and disbanded in 1810). By the Peace of Amiens in 1802, all Fencible Regiments had been disbanded and those members willing to continue serving had been transferred to regular army regiments. When the Napoleonic Wars resumed the British used alternative methods to defend the Home Nations (see for example the Additional Forces Acts 1803) and with the exception of the Royal Manx Fencibles (third corps, 1803–1811) no more fencible regiments were raised for home defence.

=== War of 1812 ===
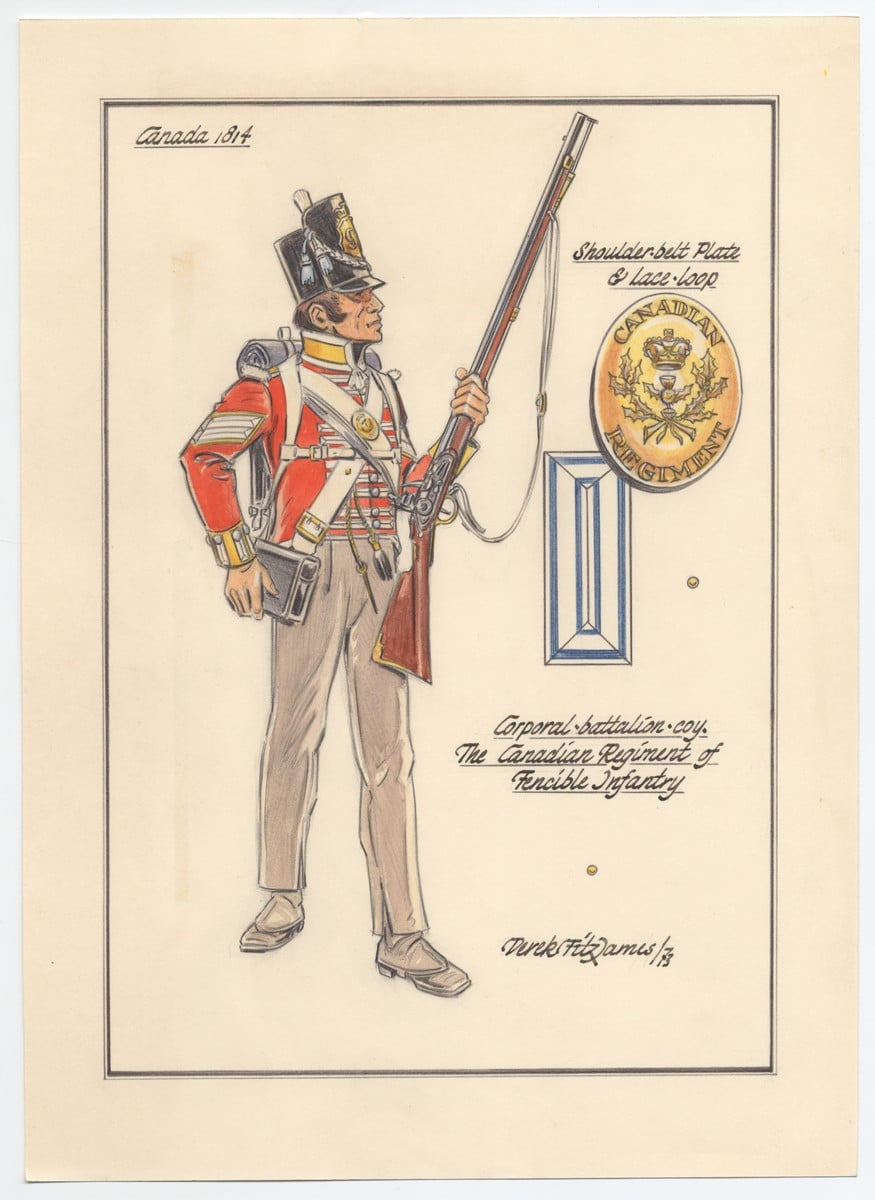
A Canadian Regiment of Fencible Infantry corporal in 1814

In the early years of the 19th Century, regiments of Fencibles were raised in the Canadas, New Brunswick, Newfoundland, and Nova Scotia. The regiments were liable for service in North America only (although the New Brunswick Fencibles volunteered for general service and became the 104th Regiment of Foot in the regular army). All but one of these regiments saw action in the War of 1812. The regiments were disbanded in 1816 and 1817, after the War of 1812. Although the units were disbanded, several regiments in Canada continue to perpetuate their historic lineage.

Most of the Fencible regiments were formed in 1803, including the Nova Scotia Fencibles, the Canadian Regiment of Fencible Infantry (perpetuated by the Royal 22nd Regiment), the Royal Newfoundland Fencibles (perpetuated by the Royal Newfoundland Regiment), and the New Brunswick Regiment of Fencible Infantry (perpetuated by the Royal New Brunswick Regiment). The Glengarry Light Infantry Fencibles (perpetuated by the Stormont, Dundas and Glengarry Highlanders) was formed in February 1812, several months prior to the war. In addition to these Canadian units, the Michigan Fencibles, a small unit of 45 troops, was raised at Fort Mackinac in 1813.

=== Bombay Fencibles ===
The Bombay Fencibles were raised in 1799 by the following order of the Bombay Army: "A regiment consisting of two battalions of natives to be, under the denomination of the 'Bombay fencibles,' raised from the inhabitants of Bombay, Salsette, and Caranjah, on condition of not being liable to serve out of the said bounds; at the pay to each private of 5 rupees 2 quarters per month, besides clothing: which last they will receive from the honorable company".

The 5th battalion of the Maratha Light Infantry was raised in December 1800 from the Bombay Fencibles as the 1st Battalion, the 9th Regiment of Bombay Native Infantry.

=== Malta ===
The Royal Malta Fencible Regiment was in existence from 1815 to 1861 when it became the Royal Malta Fencible Artillery until 1881. The term 'Fencible' was dropped in 1889 and it became the Royal Malta Artillery.

=== New Zealand Wars ===
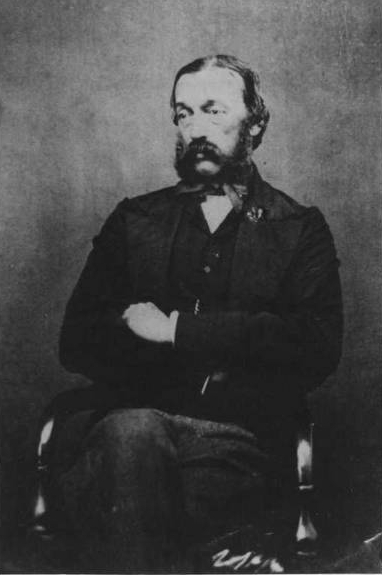
Captain John Jermyn Symonds, second in command of Fencibles at Onehunga.

In 1847 the Royal New Zealand Fencible Corps were raised and sent to New Zealand for the defence of the early settlers there. They were settled in four new outlying villages around Auckland, (then the capital), at Onehunga, Otahuhu, Panmure, and Howick, the largest of the four. About 75 fencibles and their sons took part as militia in the 1860s New Zealand Wars.

== See also ==
- Army Reserve (United Kingdom), the modern-day equivalent
- British Volunteer Corps
- Canadian forces Primary Reserve
- History of the British Army
- Home Guard (United Kingdom)
- Militia (British Dominions and Crown Colonies)
- Militia (Great Britain)
- Militia (United Kingdom)
- Territorial Army
- Yeomanry
