= Lists of military divisions =

The article provides links to lists of military divisions arranged by ordinal number, name, country or conflict.

== By number ==
- 1st
- 2nd
- 3rd
- 4th
- 5th
- 6th
- 7th
- 8th
- 9th
- 10th
- 11th
- 12th
- 13th
- 14th
- 15th
- 16th
- 17th
- 18th
- 19th
- 20th
- 21st
- 22nd
- 23rd
- 24th
- 25th
- 26th
- 27th
- 28th
- 29th
- 30th
- 31st
- 32nd
- 33rd
- 34th
- 35th
- 36th
- 37th
- 38th
- 39th
- 40th
- 41st
- 42nd
- 43rd
- 44th
- 45th
- 46th
- 47th
- 48th
- 49th
- 50th
- 51st
- 52nd
- 53rd
- 54th
- 55th
- 56th
- 57th
- 58th
- 59th
- 60th
- 61st
- 62nd
- 63rd
- 64th
- 65th
- 66th
- 67th
- 68th
- 69th
- 70th
- 71st
- 72nd
- 73rd
- 74th
- 75th
- 76th
- 77th
- 78th
- 79th
- 80th
- 81st
- 82nd
- 83rd
- 84th
- 85th
- 86th
- 87th
- 88th
- 89th
- 90th
- 91st
- 92nd
- 93rd
- 94th
- 95th
- 96th
- 97th
- 98th
- 99th
- 100th
- 101st
- 102nd
- 103rd
- 104th
- 105th
- 106th
- 107th
- 108th
- 109th
- 110th
- 111th
- 112th
- 113th
- 114th
- 115th
- 116th
- 117th
- 118th
- 119th
- 120th

== See also ==
- List of Australian divisions in World War I
- List of Australian divisions in World War II
- List of British divisions in World War I
- List of British divisions in World War II
- List of British Empire divisions in World War II
- List of Brazilian divisions in World War II
- List of Canadian divisions in World War I
- List of Canadian divisions in World War II
- List of Finnish divisions in the Winter War
- List of Finnish divisions in the Continuation War
- List of French divisions in World War II
- List of German divisions in World War II
- List of Indian divisions in World War I
- List of Indian divisions in World War II
- List of Italian divisions in World War II
- List of Japanese Infantry Divisions
- List of New Zealand divisions in World War II
- List of Polish divisions in World War I
- List of Polish divisions in World War II
- List of South African Divisions in World War II
- List of Soviet Union divisions 1917-1945
- List of divisions of the United States Army
- List of United States Marine Corps divisions
