= LXXXV Corps =

LXXXV Corps or 85th Corps may refer to:

- LXXXV Army Corps, Wehrmacht, Germany
- 85th Rifle Corps, Soviet Union

== See also ==
- List of military corps by number
- 85th Brigade (disambiguation)
- 85th Division (disambiguation)
- 85th Regiment (disambiguation)
- 85th (disambiguation)
