= 120th Regiment =

120th Regiment may refer to:

- 120th Regiment of Foot (disambiguation), British Army regiments
- 120th Infantry Regiment (United States)
- 120th Infantry Regiment "Emilia"
- 120th Field Artillery Regiment
- 120th Light Anti-Aircraft Regiment, Royal Artillery
- 120th Heavy Anti-Aircraft Regiment, Royal Artillery
- 120th (South Midland) Field Regiment, Royal Artillery
- 120th Motorized Artillery Regiment, Italy
- 120th Fighter Aviation Regiment
- 120th Guards Fighter Aviation Regiment

== American Civil War regiments ==
- 120th Illinois Infantry Regiment
- 120th Indiana Infantry Regiment
- 120th New York Infantry Regiment
- 120th Ohio Infantry Regiment

== See also ==
- 120th Brigade (disambiguation)
- 120th Division (disambiguation)
