= Canadian Division =

Canadian Division may refer to:

== Sports ==
- North Division (NHL), the temporary all-Canadian division of the National Hockey League in the 2020–21 season
- Canadian Division (NHL), a former division of the NHL
- North Division (CFL), a former Canada-wide division of the Canadian Football League

== Military ==
- 1st Canadian Division
- 2nd Canadian Division
- 3rd Canadian Division
- 4th Canadian Division
- 5th Canadian Division
- 6th Canadian Division
- 7th Canadian Infantry Division
- 8th Canadian Infantry Division

== See also ==
- List of Canadian divisions in World War I
- List of Canadian divisions in World War II
