= 85th =

85th is the ordinal form of the number 85. 85th or Eighty-fifth may also refer to:

- A fraction, 1/85, equal to one of 85 equal parts

== Geography ==
- 85th meridian east, a line of longitude
- 85th meridian west, a line of longitude
- 85th parallel north, a circle of latitude
- 85th parallel south, a circle of latitude
- 85th Street

== Military ==
- 85th Brigade (disambiguation)
- 85th Division (disambiguation)
- 85th Regiment (disambiguation)

== Other ==
- 85th century
- 85th century BC

== See also ==
- 85 (disambiguation)
