= 120th =

120th is the ordinal form of the number 120. 120th or One hundred and twentieth may also refer to:

- A fraction, 1/120, equal to one of 120 equal parts

== Geography ==
- 120th meridian east, a line of longitude
- 120th meridian west, a line of longitude

== Military ==
- 120th Brigade (disambiguation)
- 120th Division (disambiguation)
- 120th Regiment (disambiguation)

== See also ==
- April 30, 120th day of the year in a standard year
