= M85 =

M85 or M-85 may refer to:

== Military ==
- M85 machine gun, a machine-gun used in the M60 Patton series of tanks
- Zastava M85, an assault rifle developed and manufactured by Zastava Arms
- Parker-Hale M85 a sniper rifle.

== Places ==
- Messier 85, a lenticular galaxy in the constellation Coma Berenices
- 85 Io, the asteroid #85, named "Io", a main belt asteroid

=== Highways ===
- M-85 (Michigan highway), a state highway in Michigan
- M85 expressway (Hungary), an expressway in Hungary
- Mexican Federal Highway 85, a highway in Mexico
- Mexican Federal Highway 85D, a toll highway in Mexico

== Transportation ==
- Morin M85, a French homebuilt aircraft design
- M85 fuel, an 85% methanol and 15% petrol blend

== Other uses ==
- M 85, an age group for Masters athletics (athletes aged 35+)
- Sako 85, a Finnish bolt-action rifle also known as M85

== See also ==
- 85 (disambiguation)
- Model 1885 (disambiguation)
