= C85 =

C85 may refer to:

- Ruy Lopez chess openings ECO code
- Other and unspecified types of non-Hodgkin's lymphoma ICD-10 code
- Labour Inspectorates (Non-Metropolitan Territories) Convention, 1947 code
- Continental C85, a 1944 engine
- C-85 Orion, a 1931 aircraft based on the Lockheed Model 9 Orion
- ARM Juan Aldama (C85), a Mexican Navy ship, an Auk-class minesweeper originating in WWII
- C85, a Draft for Standard C programming language released in 1985 for ANSI C
- Caldwell 85 (IC 2391, the Omicron Velorum Cluster), an open cluster in the constellation Vela
- 85th Comiket

== See also ==
- 85 (disambiguation)
- C (disambiguation)
