= 1985 (disambiguation) =

1985 was a common year starting on Tuesday of the Gregorian calendar.

1985 may also refer to:

== Literature ==
- 1985 (Burgess novel), a 1978 novel by Anthony Burgess
- 1985 (Dalos novel), a 1983 novel by György Dalos
- Marvel 1985, a Marvel Comics mini-series

== Music ==
- Nineteen85, a Canadian music producer

=== Albums ===
- MCMLXXXV (album), an album by Rufio
- 1985 (album), by Enuff Z'nuff

=== Songs ===
- "1985" (J. Cole song), a song by J. Cole from KOD
- "1985" (SR-71 song), a song by SR-71 and later popular for its rendition by Bowling for Soup
- "Nineteen Hundred and Eighty-Five", a song by Paul McCartney and Wings
- "Lifted Up (1985)", a song by Passion Pit from Kindred
- "1985", a single by The Blue Hearts
- "1985", a song by Freddie Gibbs and The Alchemist from Alfredo
- "1985", a song by Carcass from Surgical Steel
- "1985", a song by Haken from Affinity
- "1985", a song by The Huntingtons from High School Rock
- "1985", a song by Manic Street Preachers from Lifeblood
- "1985", a song by Pseudo Echo from Teleporter
- "1985", a song by Bo Burnham from The Inside Outtakes

== Film, television and radio ==
- 1985 (film), a 2018 film
- Argentina, 1985, a 2022 film
- 1985 (TV Series), a 2023 Belgian television series
- 1985A, a fictional timeline from Back to the Future
- "1985", a 1955 episode of the radio comedy The Goon Show parodying George Orwell's Nineteen Eighty-Four

== Other uses ==
- 1985 Hopmann, the asteroid #1985
- M1985 pistol (Model 1985), 9mm semi-automatic Beretta

== See also ==
- 85 (disambiguation)
