= 85th Brigade =

85th Brigade may refer to:

== United Kingdom ==
- 85th Brigade (United Kingdom)
- 85th Brigade, Royal Field Artillery, British Army unit of World War I
- 85th (East Anglian) Brigade, Royal Field Artillery, British Army unit after World War I

== United States ==
- 85th Civil Affairs Brigade

== See also ==
- 85th Division (disambiguation)
- 85th Regiment (disambiguation)
