= List of Australian divisions in World War II =

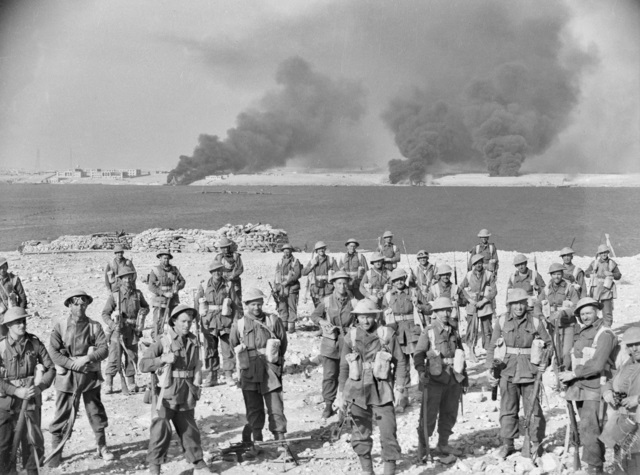
Infantrymen from the 6th Division at Tobruk, January 1941

The following is a list of Australian divisions in World War II, including all divisions raised within the Australian Army during World War II. A total of 15 such formations were established by the army during the war; of these, four infantry divisions served as part of the Second Australian Imperial Force, along with one armoured division. Two other armoured divisions were formed as part of the Militia, as well as eight other infantry divisions. The 2nd AIF formations provided the bulk of Australia's deployed forces, while many of the Militia formations were employed mainly for home defence and many were only partially formed before being broken up without seeing combat. Nevertheless, two Militia divisions were deployed as formed units, and elements of several others also fought overseas during the war.

== Divisions ==
- 1st Armoured Division
- 2nd Armoured Division – also known as 2nd Cavalry Division and 2nd Motor Division
- 3rd Armoured Division – also known as 1st Cavalry Division and 1st Motor Division
- 1st Division
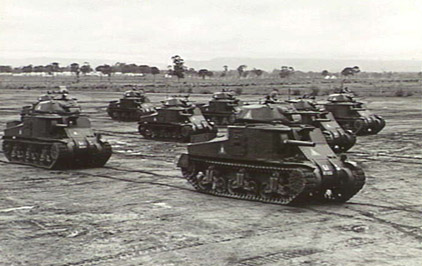
  M3 Grant medium tanks of the 1st Armoured Division at Puckapunyal, June 1942.
- 2nd Division
- 3rd Division
- 4th Division
- 5th Division
- 6th Division
- 7th Division
- 8th Division
- 9th Division
- 10th Division
- 11th Division
- 12th Division – briefly, during 1942–43; otherwise known as Northern Territory Force

(References: )

=== Second Australian Imperial Force ===
A total of five divisions were raised as part of the all volunteer Second Australian Imperial Force (2nd AIF), and this formed the bulk of Australia's deployed ground force during the war. Of these, the four infantry divisions – the 6th, 7th, 8th, and 9th – were the only 2nd AIF divisions to be fully formed and see active service. The 6th went into action first, fighting its first battle at Bardia in January 1941, and it was subsequently joined in the Middle East by the 7th and 9th Divisions, who fought several campaigns in North Africa, Greece, Syria and Lebanon. While the 8th Division was largely decimated in early 1942 during fighting against the Japanese in Malaya and then taken into captivity in Singapore, and in the islands to Australia's north, the other three infantry divisions fought throughout the war, eventually returning from the Middle East and fighting against the Japanese in the Pacific during the New Guinea and Borneo Campaigns. Initially, it had been planned to deploy the tank-equipped 1st Armoured Division to the Middle East also, but concerns about a Japanese invasion meant that they were retained in Australia for continental defence. Elements of the division did eventually see action in the Pacific against the Japanese, but only after being transferred from the division to other formations such as the 4th Armoured Brigade. Late in the war it was planned to form another infantry division within the 2nd AIF as Australia's contribution to the proposed invasion of Japan. This formation was to be designated the 10th Division – which previously existed briefly as a Militia formation in 1942 – and was to be formed using volunteers from the three remaining 2nd AIF infantry divisions, which would have been broken up, but the war ended before the division was re-established.

=== Militia ===
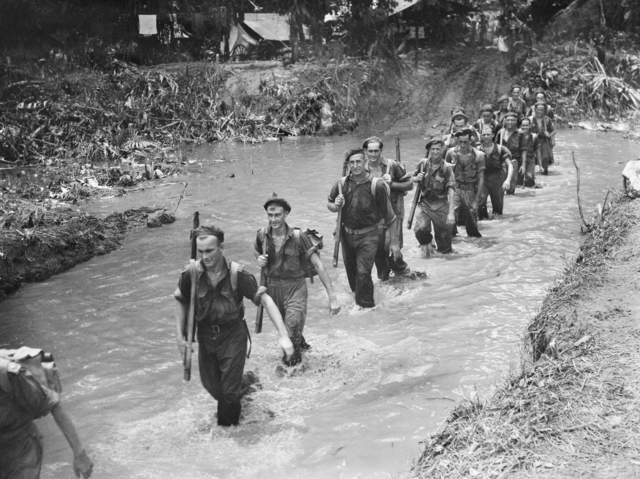
Infantrymen from the 3rd Division's 61st Infantry Battalion patrolling along the Mosigetta River on Bougainville, March 1945.

Another 10 divisions were raised or maintained as part of the Militia. This force, also known as the Australian Military Forces, consisted of a mixture of volunteers and conscripted personnel who, by Commonwealth of Australia Defence legislation, could only be deployed for active service within Australia and Australian territories. Of these 10 divisions, eight – the 1st, 2nd, 3rd, 4th, 5th, 10th, 11th and 12th – were predominantly infantry formations, and two were armoured divisions that included tank equipped regiments as well as motorised units and armoured cars. These were the 2nd Armoured and 3rd Armoured Divisions, which had been raised from two previously existing cavalry divisions that had been formed during the inter-war years. The Militia formations were mainly employed in Australia as garrison forces to respond in the event of an invasion, and as the war progressed and the threat of Japanese invasion passed many were only partially formed and or broken up without having seen combat. Both of the armoured divisions were disbanded without serving overseas and of the eight infantry divisions, only two – the 3rd and 5th Divisions – saw active service in their entirety, fighting in the New Guinea, Bougainville and New Britain campaigns between 1943 and 1945. Elements of some other Militia divisions also served overseas, although these divisions were never fully formed. The 11th Division was one such example, with various elements seeing action in New Guinea during the Finisterre Range campaign and on New Britain.

== See also ==
- List of military divisions
- List of British Commonwealth divisions in the Second World War
