= Military polonaise =

Military polonaise may refer to:

- Polonaises Op. 40 (Chopin), "Military Polonaise" by Frédéric Chopin
- A Polish military division of World War I
