= List of British colonial divisions in World War II =

The following divisions from British Crown Colonies served in World War II:

Divisions of the British Army

- 1st African Division
- 2nd African Division
- 11th African Division
- 12th African Division
- 81st West African Division
- 82nd West African Division

Divisions of the Indian Army

(Excluding units from the Indian Empire, which was technically not a Crown Colony.)

- 1st Burma Division

== See also ==
- Arab Legion
- British Solomon Islands Protectorate Defence Force
- Fiji Infantry Regiment
- List of Indian divisions in World War II
- Royal Hong Kong Regiment
- Royal Malay Regiment

== Resources ==
- British, Commonwealth, and Empire Orders of Battle on 3 September 1939

== Notes ==
- Infantry Divisions (British Army and British Indian Army) 1930 - 1956
1. British Army formations
