= Model 1885 =

Model 1885 (M1885) may refer to:

- 3.2-inch gun M1885, a rifled breech-loading fieldgun
- M1885 Remington–Lee, a bolt-action box-magazine repeating rifle longgun
- Mannlicher M1885, a prototype predecessor to the bolt-action rifle longgun Mannlicher M1886
- Springfield Model 1855, a rifled musket
- Winchester Model 1885, a single-shot rifle longgun

== See also ==
- M85 (disambiguation)
