= 120th Regiment of Foot =

Two regiments of the British Army have been numbered the 120th Regiment of Foot:

- 120th Regiment of Foot (1763), raised in 1762
- 120th Regiment of Foot (1794), raised in 1794
