= 38th (Welsh) Divisional Artillery =

Artillery formation of the British Army

- Royal Artillery cap badge
- Active: October 1914–May 1919
- Country: United Kingdom
- Branch: New Army
- Role: Field Artillery
- Size: 2–4 Artillery brigades
- Part of: 38th (Welsh) Division
- Patron: Welsh National Executive Committee
- Engagements: Battle of the Somme; Third Battle of Ypres; Battle of the Lys; Hundred Days Offensive

The 38th (Welsh) Divisional Artillery (38th (W) DA) was a Royal Field Artillery (RFA) force raised as part of 'Kitchener's Army' in early 1915. Recruited in Wales, the units served with the 'Pals battalions' of the 38th (Welsh) Division on the Western Front for three years. They also supported other formations when 38th (W) Division was out of the line. The batteries saw action at the Somme and at Ypres. During the German Spring Offensive of 1918 they operated independently of 38th (W) Division during the Battle of the Lys, and then returned to their parent division for the victorious Allied Hundred Days Offensive, in which they played a prominent part.

== Recruitment ==
On 6 August 1914, less than 48 hours after Britain's declaration of war, Parliament sanctioned an increase of 500,000 men for the Regular British Army, and the newly appointed Secretary of State for War, Earl Kitchener of Khartoum issued his famous call to arms: 'Your King and Country Need You', urging the first 100,000 volunteers to come forward. This group of six divisions with supporting arms became known as Kitchener's First New Army, or 'K1'. The flood of volunteers overwhelmed the ability of the army to absorb and organise them, and by the time the Fifth New Army (K5) was authorised, many of the units were being organised by local recruitment initiatives. One of the largest of these was the 'Welsh National Executive Committee' (WNEC) formed after a meeting held at Cardiff on 28 September under the chairmanship of David Lloyd George. The WNEC proposed to raise a complete Welsh Army Corps (WAC) of two divisions. This proposal was authorised by the WO on 10 October, and recruitment got under way. As well as the infantry 'Pals battalions' raised by these initiatives, the K5 divisions required supporting arms such as artillery and engineers. The first field artillery battery for the 1st Welsh Division was formed at Sophia Gardens at Cardiff towards the end of October. It was then sent with the other artillery recruits to the training camp at Porthcawl where they were divided into subsections. There were no uniforms before the WNEC procured clothing in the grey Welsh cloth known as Brethyn Llwyd which the men wore until sufficient khaki could be obtained. There was a complete lack of equipment with which to train, and gun drill had to be carried out with improvisations such as a pair of old horse-drawn omnibus wheels fitted with a pole and hook to practise limbering-up. 1st Welsh Division was numbered as 43rd Division on 10 December 1914.

== Organisation and Training ==
In January 1915 the artillery recruits at Porthcawl were organised into four batteries, numbered 1–4, with the original Cardiff battery as No 1. They moved to Pwllheli in February and over the following weeks each was ordered to form a second battery (Nos 5–8). Early in March Nos 3, 7 and 8 Btys moved to Criccieth and were designated '4th Temporary Brigade, 43rd Divisional Artillery', but the organisation was still evolving. During March and April the batteries split once again resulting in the 16 field batteries (4 brigades) and 1 heavy battery required for divisional artillery. (Note: The artillery component of a British infantry division during World War I was commanded by a brigadier-general and was effectively a brigade, but was never referred to as such because 'brigade' was the term used by the Royal Artillery to designate a regimental-sized unit, of which there were initially four in each division.) In April 1915 the WO decided to convert the K4 battalions into reserve units to train reinforcements for the K1–K3 units, and on 27 April the K5 divisions were renumbered to take up the designations of the K4 formations. The short-lived 43rd Division thus became 38th (Welsh) Division on 27 April. The WNEC's over-ambitious plan to raise a complete Welsh Army Corps had been abandoned by then, and the 38th was the only Welsh Kitchener division actually formed. (Note: The Welsh Army Corps was not forgotten: the Divisional Ammunition Column continued to refer to itself in document headings as '38th DAC (WAC)' as late as July 1918.) The division's embryo Royal Field Artillery (RFA) brigades were given numbers vacated by the break-up of the K4 divisions: CXIX–CXXI (119th–121st) from 30th Division, and CXXII (122nd) from 31st Division. As well as the number, the Welsh units gained those personnel who had already been posted to these K4 brigades, which brought 38th (W) DA closer to its establishment strength:

- CXIX Brigade, RFA
  - A & B Batteries – from No 2 Bty formed at Porthcawl January 1915
  - C & D Batteries – from No 6 Bty formed at Pwllheli 3 March 1915
  - CXIX Brigade Ammunition Column (BAC)
- CXX Brigade, RFA
  - A & B Batteries – from No 1 (Cardiff) Battery, formed October 1914
  - C & D Batteries – from No 6 Battery, formed at Pwllheli 12 March 1915
  - CXX BAC
- CXXI Brigade, RFA
  - A & B Batteries – from No 4 Battery, formed at Porthcawl January 1915
  - A–D Batteries – from No 8 Battery, formed at Pwllheli 8 April 1915
  - CXXI BAC
- CXXII (Howitzer) Brigade, RFA
  - A (H) and B (H) Batteries – from No 3 Battery, formed at Porthcawl January 1915
  - C (H) & D (H) Batteries – from No 7 Bty formed at Criccieth 27 March 1915
  - CXXII BAC
- 38th (Welsh) Heavy Battery, Royal Garrison Artillery (RGA)
- 38th (Welsh) Divisional Ammunition Column (DAC)

When equipped, each RFA battery would consist of four 18-pounder guns (4.5-inch howitzers in the case of CXXII (H) Bde) and the RGA battery was to receive four 60-pounder guns.

Small numbers of horses began to arrive in April 1915 and all the greys and roans were assigned to C/CCXXI Bty. 38th (Welsh) Heavy Battery, RGA left the division before June 1915; it later went to France in 1916 and served with various heavy artillery groups (see below). On 13 July Brigadier-General W.A.M Thompson was appointed Commander, Royal Artillery (CRA) of 38th (W) Division.

In August 1915 38th (W) Division began to concentrate around Winchester where it trained for open warfare on the Hampshire downland. However, for 38th (W) DA the process of organisation continued for several months: CXXII BAC was only formed at Hazeley Down Camp on 28 August. On 6 November 38th (W) Division was warned for service with the British Expeditionary Force (BEF) on the Western Front, but when the rest of the division embarked for France early in December 1915 the artillery remained behind to complete its training on the ranges at Larkhill.

== Western Front ==
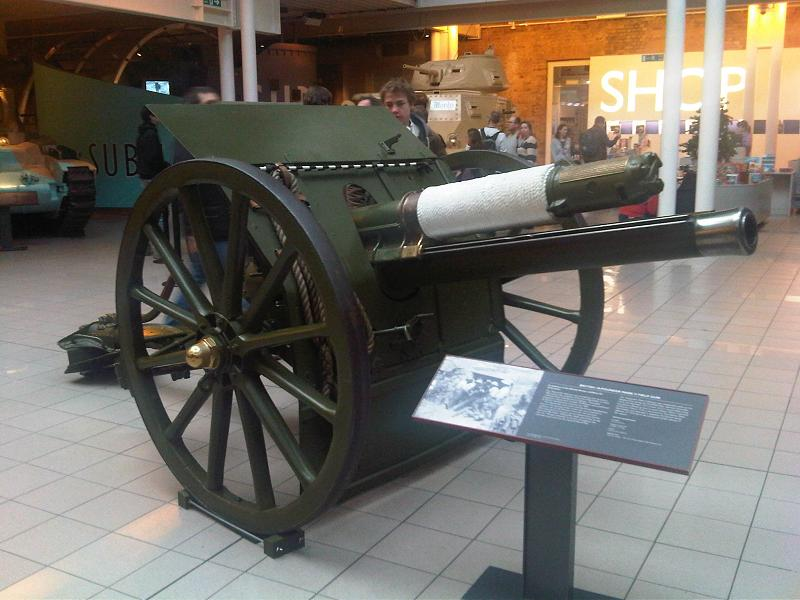
18-Pounder field gun preserved at the Imperial War Museum.

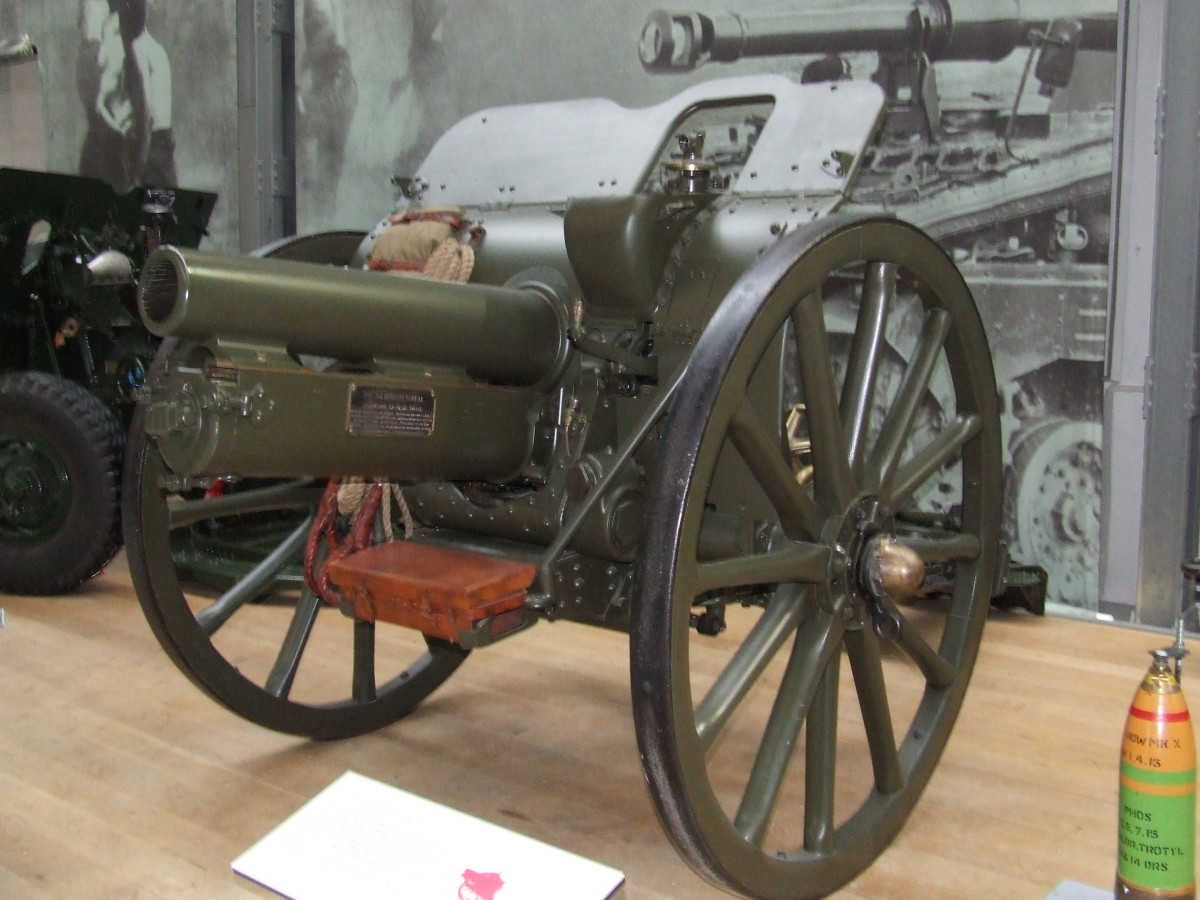
4.5-inch Howitzer at the Royal Artillery Museum.

While the infantry of 38th (W) Division were introduced to trench warfare alongside the experienced Guards and 19th (Western) Divisions in the line at Richebourg-Saint-Vaast, they were supported by I, II, III and IV (H) London Field Brigades and 10th DAC (which had all gone to France earlier with 36th (Ulster) Division). 38th (Welsh) Divisional Artillery embarked at Southampton Docks between 22 and 25 December and by 28 December it had rejoined its division with all the personnel billeted around Saint-Venant. The London brigades left in January 1916 when their parent 56th (London) Division was reformed. As with the infantry, the men of 38th (W) DA were attached to batteries of the Guards and 19th (W) Divisions for instruction. D/CXXI Battery was the first complete subunit to go up to the firing line, where it was attached to 19th (W) Division for barbed wire-cutting duty.

38th (W) Division took over responsibility for the Neuve-Chapelle sector of First Army's line on the night of 23/24 January 1916 and from then until June was continually in the line along different parts of XI Corps' front. As well as artillery ammunition, the BACs' role included supplying small arms ammunition (SAA) to the division's infantry; for example, CXX BAC supplied 114th Infantry Brigade from the time it went into the line. 38th (W) DA was based at Lestrem, with the DAC at Paradis, and completed the relief of 19th (W) DA on 30/31 January, when its batteries were distributed as 'Right Group' (CXX Bde with batteries of CXIX and CXXII) and 'Left Group' (CXXI Bde with the rest of CXIX and CXXII), while A/CXIX and single howitzers were assigned as 'Counter-Battery' (CB) or 'Flank guns'. There was little firing to begin with because poor weather restricted observation. Later in the month 19th (W) DA took over Left Group's guns in position while 38th (W) DA HQ took over command II Indian Brigade, Royal Horse Artillery, (RHA). However, the RHA found some of their 13-pounder guns to be unsteady, so they borrowed the 18-pdrs of an RFA brigade of 35th Division for a wire-cutting shoot. Right Group then took over guns in position on relieving part of 2nd Division, leaving 38th (W) DA in three groups: Right (CXXI Bde HQ), Centre (CXXII Bde HQ) and Left (CXX Bde HQ). The CRA's HQ was now at Locon. During early March wire-cutting by N Bty RHA and D (H)/CXXII continued in the Givenchy sector, where the heavy artillery, trench mortars, and tunnellers of the Royal Engineers (RE) were attacking a German salient; this led to exchanges of retaliatory fire involving the field artillery. The Germans were seen to be building a brick and concrete parapet, and 38th (W) DA demolished this with 120 rounds of 4.5-inch howitzer fire. II Indian RHA Bde was replaced by I Indian RHA Bde on 9 March, the gunners taking over the borrowed 18-pdrs. Wire cutting, parapet destruction, and enfilade fire from flanking guns continued around the Givenchy salient. Later in the month, to economise ammunition the guns were limited to four rounds each per day. 38th (W), 19th (W) and 35th DAs continued to shuffle personnel between battery positions in front of Givenchy, with the result that 38th (W) DA's batteries and waggon lines were shifted towards the 'Moated Grange' sector and the CRA moved his HQ to La Gorgue on 16 April. German aircraft and observation balloons were active when the weather permitted, and their positions having been located the batteries came under more frequent CB fire from heavy artillery, but the gunners had installed double thickness roofs over their gun pits and damage was slight. The guns supported a number of trench raids by the infantry. Each battery in turn was sent for a few days to the XI Corps Artillery Training Area (commanded by Lt-Col Pringle of CXXI Bde).

At this time 38th (W) DA was reorganised to match current practice in the BEF. The infantry brigades had begun forming light Trench Mortar Batteries (LTMBs), manned by infantrymen, in May 1915 and these were formalised in December–January 1916. By April 1916 38th (W) DA formed a brigade of medium TMBs manned by a mixture of gunners and seconded infantrymen; a heavy TMB was formed later:

- 38th (Welsh) Trench Mortars (Note: Unlike some divisions, 38th (W) DA did not refer to the group of TMBs as a brigade, but simply '38th Divisional Trench Mortar Batterfies'.)
  - X Battery – formed by April 1916
  - Y Battery – formed by April 1916
  - Z Battery – formed 5 April 1916 from 38th (W) DAC
  - V (Heavy) Battery – formed by July 1916

The mortar batteries were commanded by the Divisional Trench Mortar Office (DTMO). The medium batteries were initially issued with the 1.57-inch mortar and at first 38th (W) DA organised them into two groups of six covering the Moated Grange and Fauquissart sectors, all manned by the men of one battery, with the personnel of the second in support and providing working parties, and the third in reserve. The batteries were rotated every four days. The new TMBs carried out a shoot against the 'Duck's Bill' craters in early April. The heavy battery carried out registration with a spotter aircraft on 4 June.

The reorganisations continued in May. Brigade Ammunition Columns were disbanded and absorbed by 38th (W) Divisional Ammunition Column, which was reorganised into A Echelon (Nos 1–3 and 5 Sections) and B Echelon (No 4 Section) under divisional and corps control respectively. All the greys and roans from C/CXXI Bty were reassigned to the DAC and remained a feature of the unit until the end of the war. 330th Horse Transport Company, Army Service Corps, of the Divisional Train usually accompanied the DAC. CXXII (H) Brigade exchanged a battery with each of the other brigades on 24 May 1916, with the result that all four brigades had three 18-pdr batteries and a howitzer battery (designated D (H) Battery).

- A/CXIX became A/CXXII
- B/CXX became B/CXXII
- C/CXXI became C/CXXII
- C (H)/CXXII became D (H)/CXXII
- D/CXIX became A/CXIX
- A (H)/CXXII became D (H)/CXIX
- D/CXX became B/CXX
- B (H)/CXXII became D (H)/CXX
- D/CXXI became C/CXXI
- D (H)/CXXII became D (H)/CXXI

On 2 June CCCVII Bde of the newly arrived 61st (2nd South Midland) Division was attached to Left Group of 38th (W) DA for training.

=== Somme ===
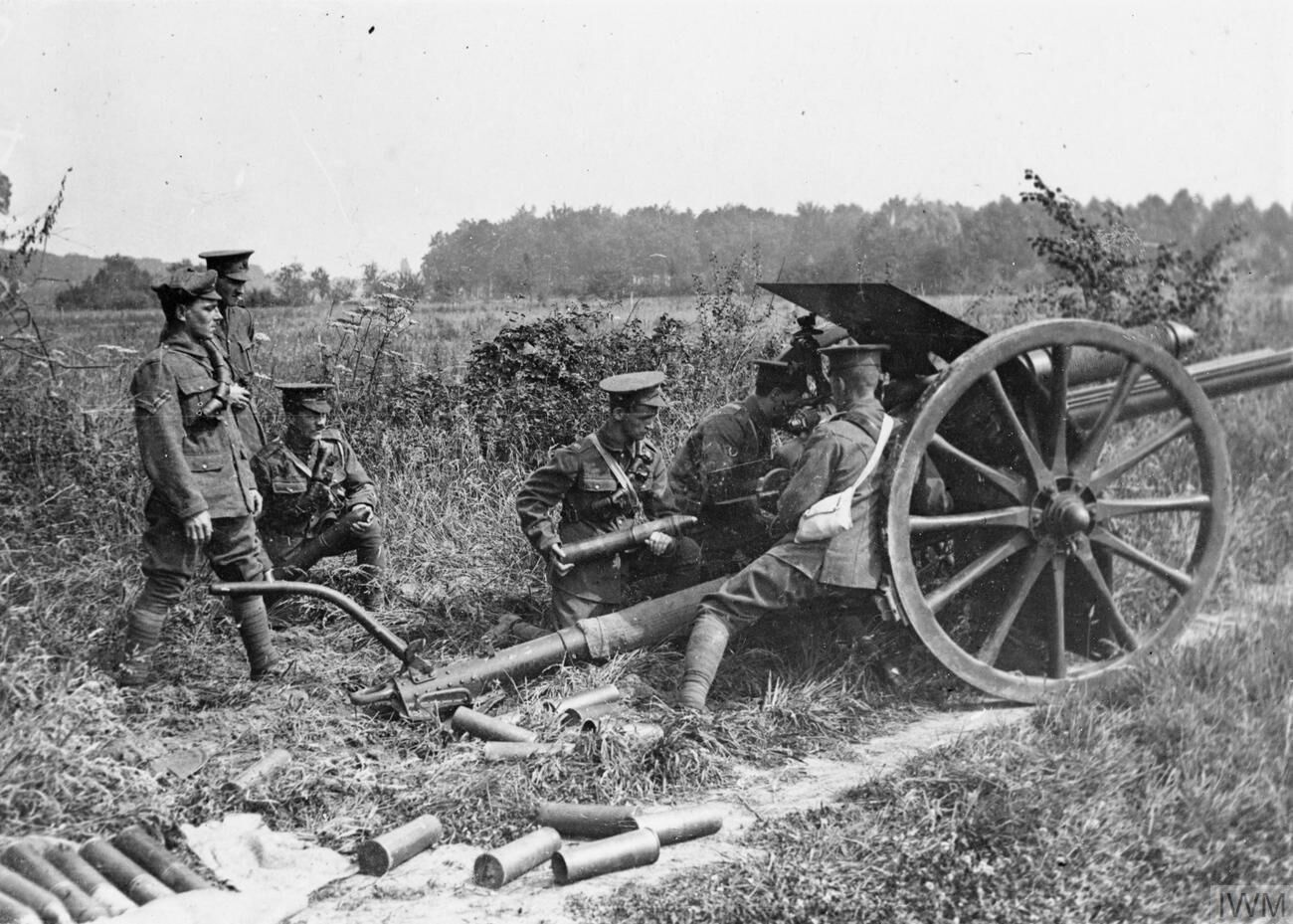
An 18-pounder in action on the Somme.

On 10 June 38th (W) Division was ordered south to join Fourth Army and prepare for the summer's 'Big Push', the Battle of the Somme. After being relieved by 61st (2nd SM) DA, 38th (W) DA began its march on 14 June and arrived at 'Grand Camp' near Saint-Pol two days later. Here it spent two weeks training before continuing its march to the south behind the infantry of the division, reaching the woods south of Treux on 4 July. The Somme Offensive had begun on 1 July with a disastrous attack across a wide front. 38th (W) Division had been warned to accompany the cavalry in exploiting a breakthrough towards Bapaume. There was no breakthrough: instead the division was switched to the Mametz sector, where there had been some success. On the afternoon of 5 July it took over the front line from 7th Division and prepared to capture Mametz Wood. However, most of 38th (W) DA (apart from the SAA Section of the DAC) had not yet arrived, so the division's single-brigade attack on 7 June was supported by the artillery of 7th and 21st Divisions with whom they had not previously worked, which led to poor coordination. CXXI Brigade got into action in the Fricourt–Mametz sector under the command of 21st DA, which was covering 17th (Northern) Division's parallel attack, while CXIX Bde had to hand over six 18-pdrs and two howitzers to replace guns of 21st DA that were out of action (it later received two howitzers and one 18-pdr of 21st DA that had been repaired). The first attacks on Mametz Wood having failed, 38th Division tried again on 10 July with its full weight. All of 38th (W) Division's artillery was now in action, CXIX and CXXI Bdes with 21st DA, CXX and CXXII with 7th DA, which had remained in the line supporting 38th (W) Division. At 03.30 a heavy concentrated fire was put down on the nearer edge of the wood, and at 03.50 a smoke barrage was fired at the flanking parts. There were two novel elements to the barrage; firstly it lifted off the enemy trenches as if the infantry were about to attack, and then resumed firing when the Germans were presumed to have come out of their dugouts. Secondly, it was a Creeping barrage, which had first been tried on 1 July. Where the troops kept up close to the barrage they were able to enter the wood behind it and take their first objective with little difficulty, though shells of both sides passing over their heads frequently burst among the upper branches of the trees, causing further casualties. Although at 05.50 they requested the barrage to lift onto the second objective the artillery could not change the timetable. At 06.15 the barrage moved on and the troops pushed further into the wood, where fighting went on all day. At 09.35 the artillery observers saw fresh Germans entering the wood from the north to mount a counter-attack. However, the gunners dared not open fire on these targets for fear of hitting their own men. By 16.30 most of 113th and 114th Infantry Bdes were in the wood and had pushed the Germans to the far edge, but a fresh bombardment and renewed attack failed to clear them entirely. 115th Brigade relieved the other infantry brigades and attempted to clear the rest of the wood the following afternoon with a fresh bombardment and a Box barrage to hold back enemy reinforcements, but it proved too dangerous to hold the edge of the wood facing the German Second Position. However, German attacks from this line towards Mametz Wood were broken up next day by CXXI Bde among other units. The infantry of 38th (W) Division, who had lost heavily during the bitter fighting, were relieved by 7th and 21st Divisions at dawn on 12 July and they withdrew towards Amiens with the SAA Section of the DAC.

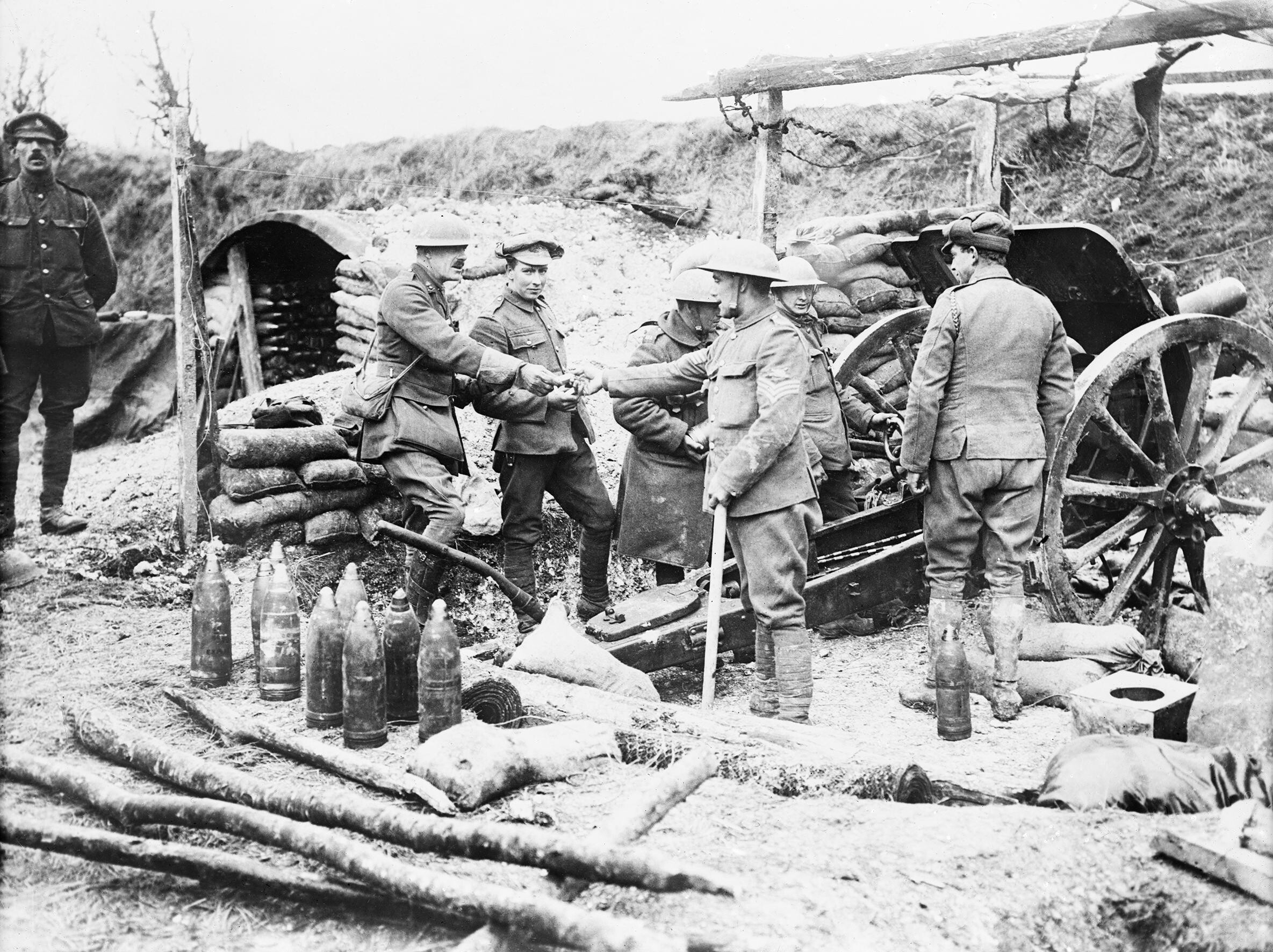
A 4.5-inch howitzer in action on the Somme.

The divisional artillery (including the rest of 38th (W) DAC and 330th HT Company) remained in the line, supporting 21st Division. During the night of 10/11 July CXIX and CXX Bdes had been pushed forward into range to begin cutting the wire of the German second position beyond the wood, and CXXI Bde moved up the following night. However, the continuous shooting was wearing out the buffer springs of the guns, and CXXI Bde had 9 out of 12 18-pdrs out of action. Before dawn on the morning of 14 July 38th (W) DA fired in support of the successful attack on the German second position (the Battle of Bazentin Ridge), and later in the day CXX Bde moved up to a forward position. The divisional artillery continued firing in support of XV Corps' Attacks on High Wood until 19 July, when it left Fourth Army and marched to rejoin 38th (W) Division with Reserve Army around Couin in the now-quiet northern part of the Somme sector. It took over the guns and positions of 48th (South Midland) Division in two groups (Right – CXIX and CXX Bdes; Left – CXXI and CXXII Bdes) and then on the nights of 24/25 and 25/26 July took over more of the front from 12th (Eastern) Division with a group of mixed batteries from different brigades and V/38 TMB, all under Lt-Col P.J. Paterson of CXIX Bde. 38th (W) DA was relieved on the night of 7/8 August and marched to Doullens, the DAC and TMBs going to Thièvres. The whole entrained on 12 August and rejoined 38th (W) Division resting round Esquelbecq behind the Ypres Salient. It took over the front near St Sixte facing Pilckem Ridge on 21–23 August, the DAC at Peselhoek supplying ammunition direct to the gun positions.

=== Ypres Salient ===
The BEF's field artillery was now being reorganised into six-gun batteries: in three of 38th (W) DA's brigades one 18-pdr battery was split up to bring the others up to six guns, and was replaced by a battery from CXX Bde, which was broken up on 28–29 August. The howitzer batteries remained with four guns; CXIX Bde now had two howitzer batteries:

- CXIX Bde: C Bty split between A and B/CXIX; D (H)/CXX joined as C (H)/CXIX
- CXX Bde: A Bty to CXXI Bde; B Bty split up between A/CXX and B/CXXII; C Bty to CXXII Bde; D (H) Bty to CXIX Bde
- CXXI Bde: A Bty split up between B and C/CXXI; A/CXX joined as A/CXXI
- CXXII Bde: C Bty split up between A/CXXII and C/CXX (which became C/CXXII)

The Ypres Salient was relatively quiet at this period, and the batteries conserved ammunition. They carried out retaliatory fire at the request of the infantry, and fired on any targets of opportunity, such as enemy machine gun or snipers' posts, working parties, dugouts or field guns spotted by the observation posts (OPs). They also supported occasional trench raids with bombardments and wire-cutting, including one on 'Canadian Dugouts' on 28/29 September, and another on the 'Caesar's Nose' salient on Pilckem Ridge on 12/13 October. Retaliatory fire was often directed at the German OPs in 'High Command Redoubt', with little effect, until 17 November when a large and destructive raid was carried out on it by 14th Welsh Regiment (Swansea). For this action A and C/CXXII fired on 16 and 17 November to cut a lane through the wire, creating a 60 yards (55 m) wide breach and then keeping it open with bursts of fire after dark to deter repair parties; the batteries also created a second gap in front of 'Essen Redoubt' as a diversion. 38th (W) DA and the heavy batteries bombarded the enemy positions during these days. Then at 22.59 on 17/18 November 38th (W) DA provided a close bombardment on the High Command and Essen redoubts from enfilade positions (to avoid firing over heads of the raiders) and also smothered the flanking 'Morteldje Redoubt' to prevent it intervening. Meanwhile, the heavy guns fired to suppress all known German batteries in the area. 38th (W) DA then fired a 'Pocket' or 'Box barrage' to protect the raiders while they went about their work, ceasing fire at 23.50. 38th (W) Division was relieved on 12–13 December, the artillery being relieved over the following days and going back to a training area near Calais.

=== Winter 1916–17 ===
The insignia adopted by 38th (Welsh) Division in January 1917.

After the Somme, General Headquarters decided that it needed a reserve of field artillery to reinforce parts of the front without breaking up divisional artillery. Each infantry division contributed one of its RFA brigades to become independent Army Field Artillery (AFA) brigades in this reserve. 38th (Welsh) DA provided CXIX Bde, which formally left the division on 14 January 1917. Before it transferred, its C (H) Bty was split up between D (H)/CXXI and D (H)/CXXII of 38th (W) DA to bring them up to 6 guns each, and CXIX was joined by B/CLXXIX and half of D (H)/CLXXIX from 39th (Deptford) DA to bring it up to full strength. No 3 Section of the DAC (less its SAA Section) transferred to it as CXIX BAC (a new No 3 Section was formed in the DAC by combining the SAA sections).

In fact CXIX AFA Bde remained attached to 38th (W) DA for some months, and moved with it back to the Ypres Salient. Lieutenant-Col Paterson continued to command Left Group of 38th (W) DA during this period and even acted as CRA of 38th (W) Division for a few days in May. The batteries of 38th (W) DA relieved those of 39th DA at Elverdinge on 19 January and took over their guns in position as the left hand division of the BEF, with HQ at St Sixte. On 27 January they were joined by reinforcing batteries from CCLXXV Bde of 55th (West Lancashire) DA. On 30 January Left Group brought down effective defensive fire when Germans raided the Belgian troops to their left; Right Group fired to cover 38th (W) Division but no attack developed on its front. During February the Germans systematically shelled gun positions on 38th (W) Division's front with heavy guns and gas shells, but caused little damage. The batteries most affected shifted positions and the abandoned positions continued to attract enemy fire. The divisions of VIII Corps, 38th (W), 39th and 55th (WL), rotated positions in the Boesinghe sector, but the divisional artilleries remained in their group positions, with some shuffling of batteries. Right Group including CXII Brigade fired a feint bombardment in conjunction with a raid by on 14th Royal Welsh Fusiliers (RWF) on 17 February, and the following night harassed roads during a German divisional relief on their front. The sector quietened down in April and remained so until early May, when the Germans heavily shelled the back areas, including the divisional railhead and DAC at Peselhoek. The railhead came under long-range artillery fire again on 6 June, when a few casualties were suffered by 38th (W) DAC's horses and men. The horses were got out as quickly as possible, harnessed up to the waggons and moved out to camp at Coppernolle. 38th (W) DA supported major raids, by 15th (Carmarthen) Bn Welsh Regiment on 29 April, 13th (2nd Rhondda) Bn Welsh on the 'Von Kluck' position on 30 April/1 May, and by 15th (London Welsh) Bn RWF on 15 June.

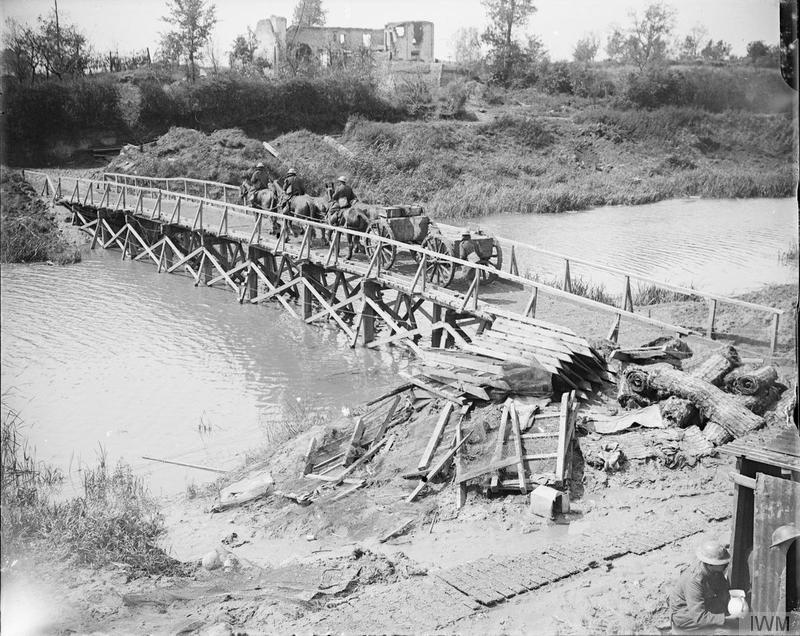
Ammunition limber crossing the Yser Canal, 3 August 1917.

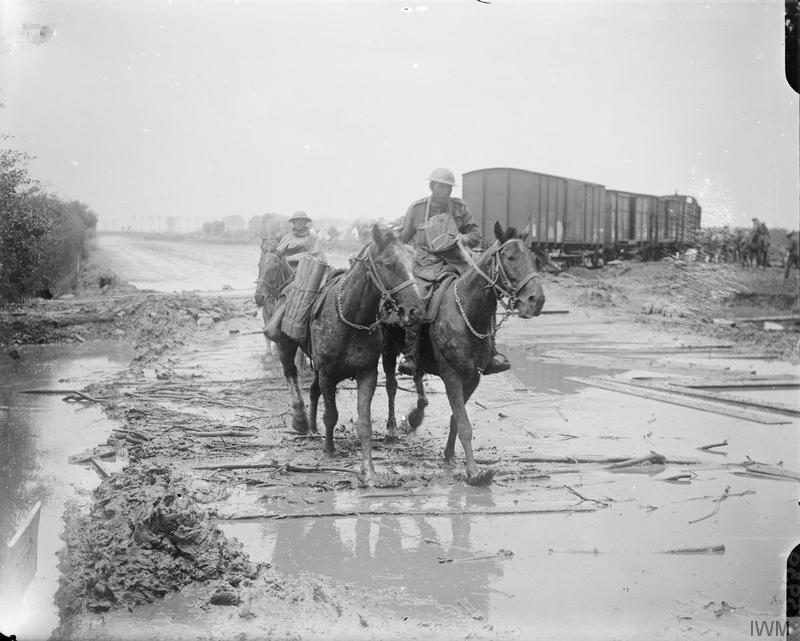
Field gun ammunition being taken forward by pack horses, 1 August 1917.

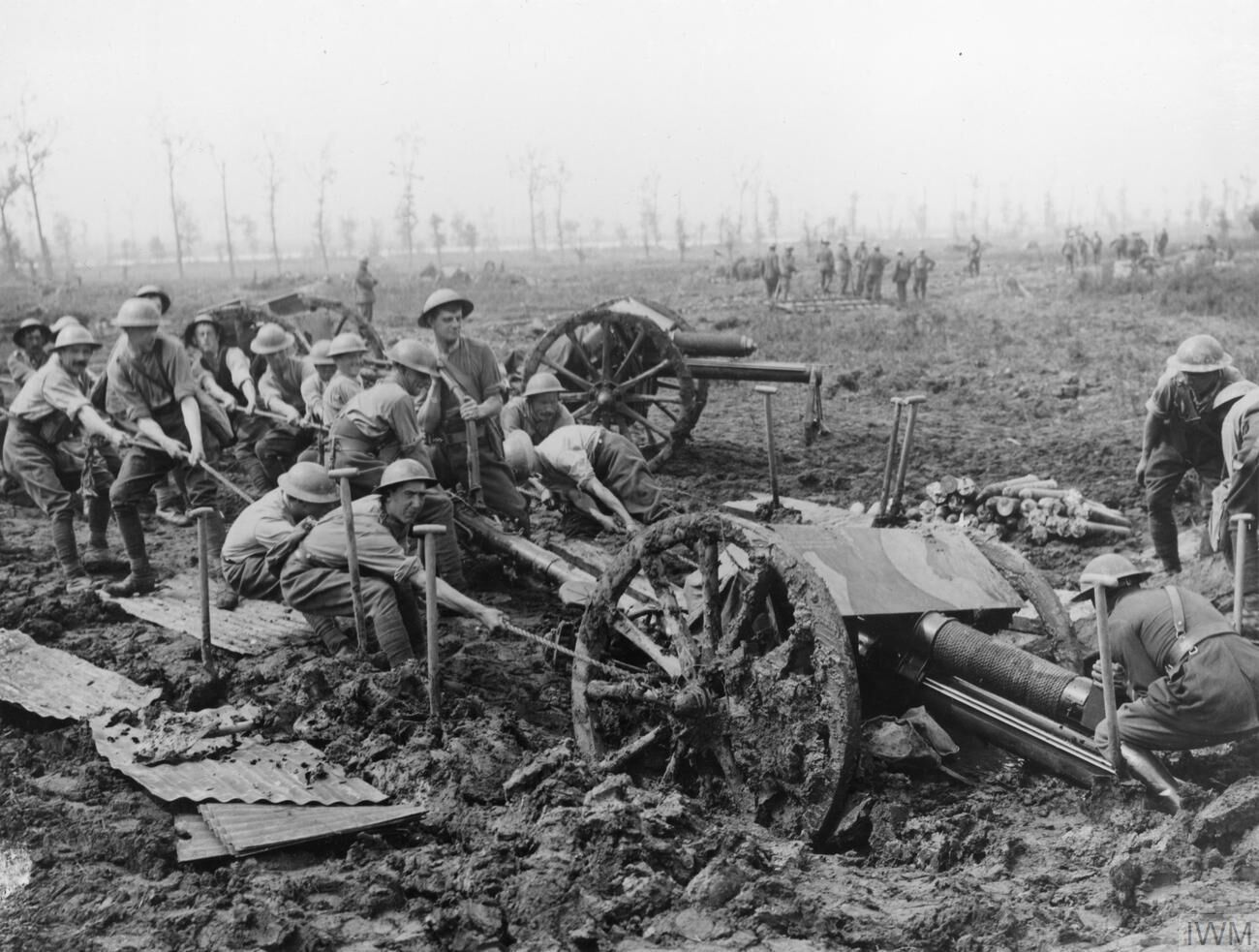
18-pounders being hauled out of mud at Ypres, August 1917.

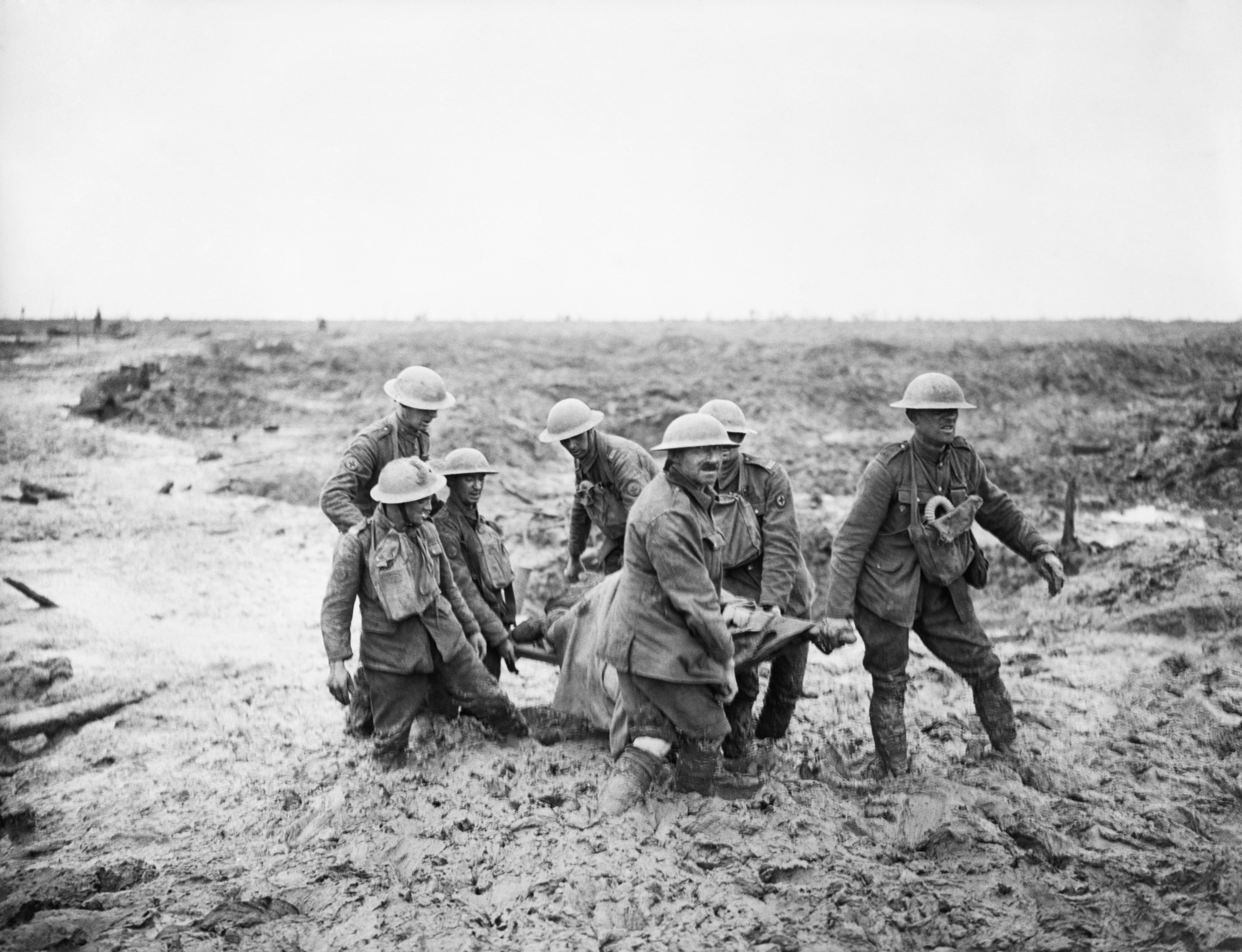
Stretcher-bearers struggle through the mud near Boesinghe after the Battle of Pilckem Ridge, 1 August 1917 (Photograph by John Warwick Brooke).

=== Pilckem Ridge ===
The Germans were responding to British preparations for an offensive in the Ypres sector, which began with the preliminary attack at Messines on 7 June, when 38th (W) DA carried out a diversionary barrage. XIV Corps of Fifth Army took over the Boesinghe sector during June for the forthcoming Third Ypres Offensive. On 17 June Guards Division came into the line to the left of 38th (W) Division and relieved 38th (W) DA's Left Group, which took up new positions at Herzeele and Mordacque Farm. Harassing and retaliatory fire by both sides' artillery became more intense. An OP was shelled by heavy guns on 16 June, C/CXXI's battery positions the following day, the OC being wounded, and C/CXXII at Mordacque Farm on 22 June. The DAC at Coppernole was shelled again on 25/26 June and regularly through July, and further casualties were suffered in moving ammunition up to the front. While 38th (W) DA carried out wire-cutting, their positions in the 'Canal Bank' sector attracted hostile CB fire, eight men being killed when a dugout received a direct hit. With the amount of firing, all the batteries had one or two guns out of action for repair; D (H)/CXXII had two howitzers destroyed by premature explosions in the barrel. When the division's infantry were withdrawn at the end of June to practise the coming attack, the artillery, engineers and pioneers remained in place, continuing preparations for the offensive. The TMBs paid particular attention to the enemy trenches around 'Caesar's Nose' and 'Cactus Junction'. By now V/38 Bty was using the 9.45-inch Heavy Mortar and the medium batteries were training on the Newton 6-inch Mortar to replace the 2-inch Medium Mortar with its 'toffee apple' bombs. They were also reinforced by the TMBs of 20th (Light) and 61st (2nd SM) Divisions from reserve, with infantry carrying parties to bring up the bombs. The bombardment and counter-bombardment reached their climax from 16 July. The infantry of 38th (W) Division returned to the line by 20 July, and Z Day for the offensive was finally set for 31 July. On the morning of 27 July the Royal Flying Corps reported that the battered enemy trenches in front of 38th (W) and Guards Division were unoccupied. The two divisions sent forward patrols to test the defences. The Guards found that the Germans had evacuated the whole of their first position to avoid the shelling, and they were able to establish a line across the Yser Canal. The Welsh patrols advancing from the canal also found the German front line unoccupied, and almost reached 'Cactus Junction' before discovering the German garrison in their support and reserve lines.

By 02.30 on 31 July the infantry formed up in the assembly trenches on the far side of the canal. The enemy was unusually quiet, which was attributed to the heavy gas shelling of their positions. At 03.50 the guns opened, firing the biggest creeping barrage ever attempted. Two-thirds of the 18-pdrs were in this barrage, while the rest of the 18-pdrs and the 4.5-inch howitzers fired a standing barrage on the German second line, which lifted as the creeping barrage approached. The infantry had carefully practised their attack, timed to follow the creeping barrage. 113th and 114th Infantry Bdes of 38th (W) Division took their 'Blue Line' objectives with little opposition and captured the Germans sheltering in the Caesar's Nose dugouts. They went on to take and consolidate the 'Black Line', but ran into more opposition in reaching the 'Green Line' beyond 'Iron Cross Ridge'. Eventually 115th Infantry Bde established a line along the Steenbeek stream, protected from counter-attacks by standing artillery barrages. The success in this area was attributed to the excellent cooperation between the infantry and artillery. During the afternoon it began to rain and this continued for days. With mud hampering movement in the forward area, 38th (W) DAC formed a forward ammunition dump on 31 July, supplied by the corps echelon, from which the A Echelon used pack animals to take ammunition forward to the batteries. The mortar batteries did not fire on Z day itself, but supplied 110 men as additional stretcher bearers to help evacuate the wounded; by 3 August all the mortar crews and their attached DAC men except X/38 and Z/38 Btys were engaged in this work. Conditions for the troops holding the line of the Steenbeek were terrible, but it was not until 6 August that the infantry of 38th (W) Division could be relieved and rested. The TMBs also went back for training at 'Sarawak Camp', with the exception of one Newton mortar and crew, who were left to keep the troublesome German garrison in 'Au Bon Gite' farm under fire.

When the infantry of 38th (W) Division returned to the line on 17/18 August, the village of Langemarck behind the Steenbeek swamp had been captured by 20th (L) Division backed by all available artillery. On 27 August, as one of a number of actions that day, 16th (Cardiff City) Bn Welsh Regiment was sent to attack 'Eagle Trench', which had resisted capture in the earlier attack. Zero was at 13.55, but the battalion had been holding the assembly position (a line of muddy shell holes) since the night before, and when the time came they struggled to move forward through the mud. The creeping barrage got away from them and the battalion failed with terrible casualties. On 28 and 29 August 38th (W) DA's mortars were moved up from Canal Bank to Langemarck Church to bring the German lines within range. On that night 38th (W) DAC's 'Bletchley Dump' was shelled and a quantity of ammunition was destroyed, burning all night. On 1 September the DAC was reorganised, a number of surplus men and horses being transferred to the field brigades, but the unit was joined by a 141-man detachment from the British West Indies Regiment to work on ammunition handling at the dumps.

=== Winter 1917–18 ===
38th (W) Division began to be relieved on 11 September, and marched via Proven to Croix du Bac in the Armentières sector, where it took over the line from 57th (2nd West Lancashire) Division. The TMBs went by motor lorry and took over 57th (2nd WL)'s emplacements on 20 September. The DAC left Coppernole on 15 September and went via Steenbecque to take over 57th (2nd WL) DAC's dumps and bomb stores on 21 September. CXXI Bde was established at Armentières and CXXII Bde was at Fleurbaix. 38th (W) DA also had CLXIX AFA Bde under its command. Until the end of March 1918, the division was engaged in routine trench warfare in this sector, with the usual trickle of casualties. The 18-pdrs and TMBs were used for wire-cutting and destruction of trenches, which attracted retaliatory fire. The field guns also carried out neutralisation fire on enemy batteries in conjunction with 91st Heavy Artillery Group.. The Newton mortars were also used to reinforce the field guns' night 'SOS' barrages, each mortar having its own target to be bombarded on receipt of the appropriate code word from the infantry. The waggon lines of B/CXXII Bty were bombed by German aircraft on the night of 1/2 October, suffering casualties to men and horses. Registration of targets was carried out with observation aircraft from No 10 Squadron, Royal Flying Corps, until No 4 Sqn with RE8 aircraft took over on 26 November. When Brig Thompson took over temporary command of XI Corps' artillery in late October, and then acted as commander of 38th (W) Division 17–22 November, Lt-Col E.C. Pottinger of CLXIX AFA Bde officiated as commander of 38th (W) DA until Lt-Col Rudkin of CXXII Bde returned to take over. On the evening of 28 October Centre and Left Groups of 38th (W) DA fired in conjunction with a gas bomb attack by No 1 Special Company, RE. Early on 8 November the field gun brigades and TMBs, reinforced for the occasion by LIX Bde (11th (Northern) DA), fired to support raids by 13th Bn RWF and 10th (1st Gwent) Bn, South Wales Borderers (SWB). The following day CLXIX AFA Bde left the divisional area with its guns and was replaced by CXLVII AFA Bde which had to borrow guns from the other brigades and spares from the DAC. In December 3rd Australian Division relieved the infantry of 38th (W) Division and 38th (W) DA's units were reorganised, Left (Armentières) Group being relieved by an artillery group of the Portuguese Expeditionary Corps, then Right (Fleurbaix) Group by 7th Australian Field Brigade. 38th (W) DA with CXLVII AFA Bde then formed new Right and Left Groups at Fleurbaix and Bois-Grenier to cover 38th (W) Division's new front. CXXII Brigade remained at Fleurbaix but CXXI Bde moved its HQ to Sailly to command Left Group and its batteries took over Australian guns.

Brigadier-Gen Thompson took over acting command of 38th (W) Division again on 15 January 1918, and on 17/18 January the whole division was taken out of the line for rest and training around Estaires. The units of 38th (W) DA were billeted at Haverskerque and the batteries fired on the ranges at Merville. On 11 February 38th (W) DA was ordered to relieve 57th (2nd WL) DA at Armentières: this was completed on 18 February and the batteries resumed the routine of trench warfare. Once again CXLVII AFA Bde was attached to 38th (W) DA, but it left on 25 February, leaving 38th (W) DA consisting of two groups, each of one of its own brigades, covering the front of the two Welsh infantry brigades in the line.

During the BEF's reorganisation that month, Z/38 TMB was split up between X/38 and Y/38, while V/38 Heavy TMB was transferred to XV Corps on 9 February. Medium TMBs were now entirely manned by the RFA, and heavy TMBs by the RGA. Brigadier-Gen Thompson left on 20 March and Lt-Col W.C.E. Rudkin assumed temporary command of 38th (W) DA until Brig-Gen T.E. Topping took over on 1 April.

=== Battle of the Lys ===
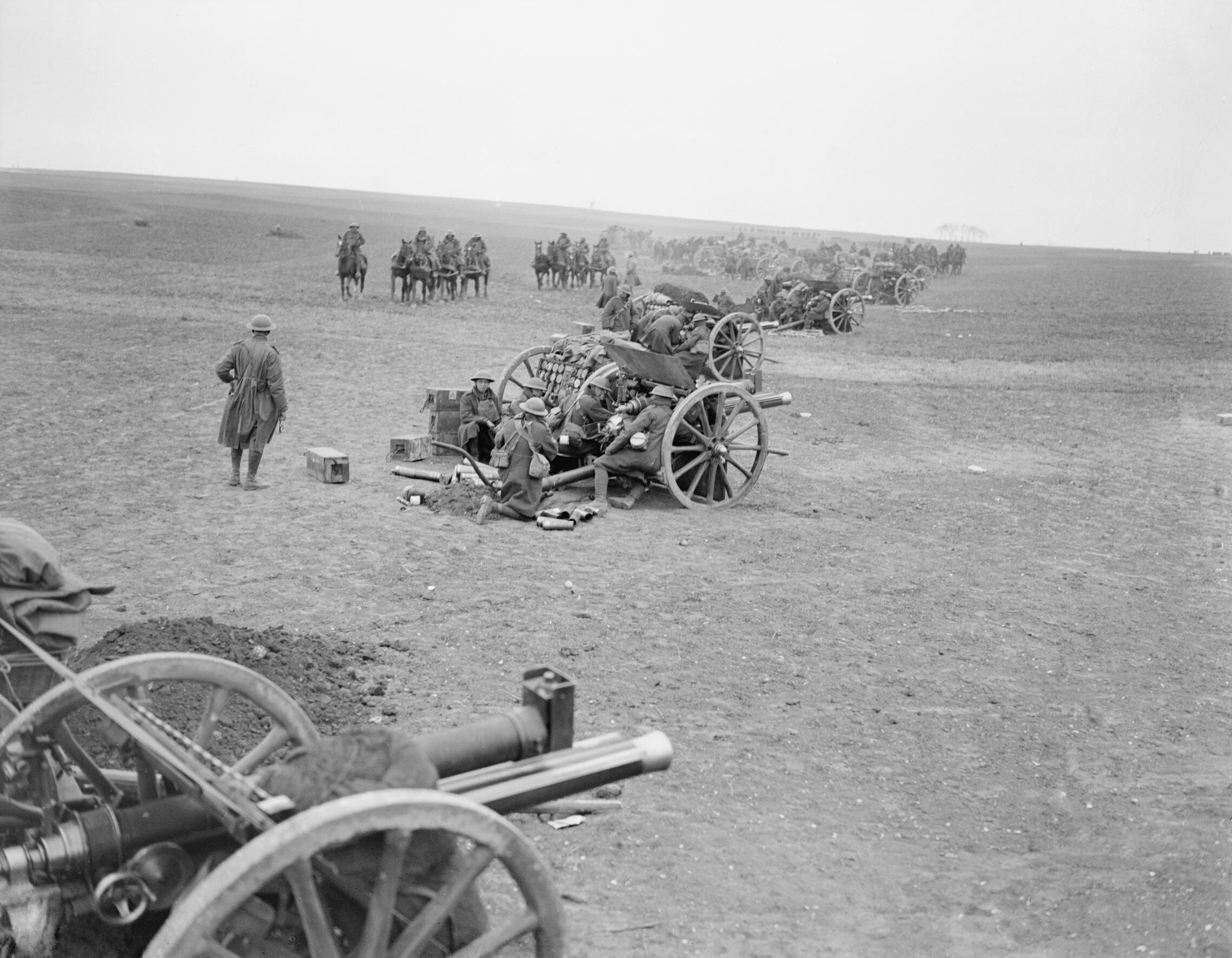
18-pounder battery in action in the open during the Spring Offensive.

The Germans launched their long-anticipated Spring Offensive on 21 March on the Somme. The Armentières sector was not attacked, but came under shellfire, a gun of C/CXXII being destroyed. On 28 March the guns of 38th (W) DA provided a box barrage for a raid by 10th SWB, but the next day the infantry of 38th (W) Division were moved south to relieve divisions that had been badly battered during the first phase of the offensive. 38th (W) DA (less the SAA Section of the DAC, which went with Divisional HQ) remained in position supporting 34th Division, one of those divisions that had been sent to Armentières to rest and reform. However, this was where the Germans launched the second phase of the offensive (the Battle of the Lys). On the night of 7/8 April they bombarded Armentières very heavily with gas shells. CXXII Brigade was in the town and suffered badly, Lt-Col Rudkin and all the officers at Brigade HQ except one becoming casualties; Maj W.A.C. Stone of A/CXXII Bty took over temporary command of the brigade the following evening. The planned relief of 38th (W) DA by 34th DA was cancelled and the batteries remained in place, though 34th DAC took over from 38th (W) DAC, which went back to Haverskerque. At 04.15 on 9 April the Germans opened a heavy bombardment along the whole sector, especially on the battery areas. The DTMO's HQ at Erquinghem and CXXI Bde HQ at La Rolanderie were both hit, and two howitzers of D (H)/CXXI in a forward position were destroyed. When the infantry assault came in at 08.00 34th Division was not directly attacked, but the neighbouring 40th Division had to fall back when its flank was exposed by the collapse of the Portuguese Expeditionary Corps. Before midday the enemy were within 500 yards (460 m) of CXXI Bde's HQ, and the batteries withdrew through Armentières to prepared positions across the River Lys near Nieppe, while CXXII Bde remained in positions in and around the town. The TMBs were withdrawn and attached to 34th DAC across the Lys. By the end of the day the batteries that had been shooting north-east were now shooting south-west into the German breakthrough. Next day (10 April) attacks developed on both sides of Armentières. CXXII Brigade fell back through Nieppe about midday. CXXI Brigade withdrew to positions in front of Steenwerck (having to abandon about 14 ammunition waggons when their teams were hit and the road was blocked), but by 14.00 the infantry were withdrawing through their positions. The batteries withdrew singly under machine gun and rifle fire to positions near Steenwerck Station. These three withdrawals amounted to 2 miles (3.2 km) under constant fire, with the guns forming rallying points for the infantry. One battery retired under cover of its own Lewis guns firing from the limbers while on the move. About 16.30 88th Infantry Bde from 29th Division arrived to find the front held only by the field artillery and two 60-pounders firing over open sights. These fresh troops advanced through the guns and took over the defence of the railway embankment. The batteries then fell back to the Bailleul–Nieppe road; both brigades were behind Nieppe, with B and D (H)/CXXII Btys covering 25th Division. Armentières was evacuated that night, a single gun of CXXI Bde, which had been positioned as an anti-tank gun, being hauled away behind an infantry field cooker.

On 11 April the batteries remained in position until 15.00 when they were ordered to conform to the infantry's withdrawal. Over the following days (the Battle of Bailleul) 38th (W) DA carried out a slow rearguard action as Second Army retired north-west through Bailleul to St Jan Cappel. 38th (W) DAC marched up from Haverskerque to Morbecque, arriving on 12 April and began establishing ammunition dumps; the men of the TMBs were doing the same for 34th DAC. The two field brigades were under command of 34th Division and were the only artillery covering the long frontage held by this division augmented by three infantry brigades: 74th (25th Division), 88th (29th Division) and 147th (2nd West Riding) (49th (West Riding) Division). The infantry of 34th Division were relieved on 14/15 April and 59th (2nd North Midland) Division took over command of this front for the later stages of the retreat. All this while the two field brigades kept up harassing fire against the advancing enemy at a rate of 60 rounds per battery per hour until they fired off all the ammunition dumped at their gun positions, then the batteries moved back singly or in pairs to the next position. The batteries each fired 1440 or more rounds per day. Despite fierce German attacks the British line held fast in front of St Jan Cappel on 15 April, and two field brigades of 36th DA came under orders of 38th (W) DA. That night French reinforcements began to arrive and the fighting died down in this sector, after a final series of small German attacks were driven off on 17 April, largely by the increased weight of artillery. Between 8 and 21 April 38th (W) DA suffered casualties of 1 officer and 12 ORs killed, 23 officers and 140 ORs wounded, and 16 ORs missing, and it earned the thanks of 34th Division.

From 20 to 24 April 38th (W) DA covered the line under French command, then was withdrawn into Army Reserve and marched back to waggon lines at Hamhoek early on 25 April. However, just as the batteries were unharnessing they received word that the Germans had captured Kemmel, and 38th (W) DA was ordered to join 25th Division to cooperate with the French for a counter-attack at 03.00 next day (the Second Battle of Kemmel Ridge). The batteries moved into position after dark along the Scherpenberg Beek. Because of the range to the final objective (4,000 yards (3,700 m)) they were drawn up no more than 1,500 yards (1,400 m) behind the front line. Orders only reached the brigades about an hour before Zero but the barrage was fired on time, and 25th Division's attack was successful. Unfortunately the French were held up and 25th Division had to return to its starting line during daylight, leaving the batteries very exposed. 38th (W) DA was withdrawn on the night of 26/27 April to positions on the Groot Beek north-east of Reningelst. On 29 April the enemy made a final attempt to capture the Mont Noir–Scherpenberg Ridge, beginning with a two-hour gas bombardment and 40 minutes of high explosive (HE). 38th (W) DA HQ and CXXI Bde were with 25th Division and CXXII Bde was with 49th (WR) Division. The batteries fired SOS and counter-preparation tasks for hours until the Germans were driven off. 38th (W) DA received the thanks of 25th Division.

=== Aveluy Wood ===
After 25th Division was relieved by French troops, 38th (W) DA went into Army Reserve at Lederzeele on 5 May. On 8 May its HQ was lent to XV Corps to command the Right Group artillery at Wallon-Cappel, while its two brigades were in the line under 33rd DA. On the nights of 14/15 and 15/16 May the brigades were withdrawn from the line and the elements of 38th (W) DA came together at Proven. They entrained on 18 May to go in reserve around Doullens, west of Albert under Third Army. They went into rest billets at Gézaincourt, moving to Raincheval on 31 May. Over the following weeks the field brigades and TMBs were used to reinforce or relieve units of other divisions of V Corps, including 17th (N), 33rd, 35th and 63rd (Royal Naval) Division, the latter of which was alternating with 38th (W) Division at Aveluy Wood. On the nights of 10/11 and 11/12 June the units rejoined 38th (W) Division for the first time since 29 March. Aveluy Wood was a relatively active sector with numerous raids, including one by 2nd and 14th RWF on 20/21 June and another by 2nd RWF on 11/12 July. The artillery on both sides employed gas shelling and sudden 'crash' barrages to catch the enemy unawares. On 18/19 July 38th (W) Division was withdrawn from Aveluy Wood and went to the Hérissart area to train for the coming Allied offensive, though the divisional artillery remained in the line until 27 July. The division returned to Aveluy Wood on 5 August. The batteries were deployed in depth, each with two forward guns while the others in the main position remained silent except for SOS calls.

=== Albert & Bapaume ===
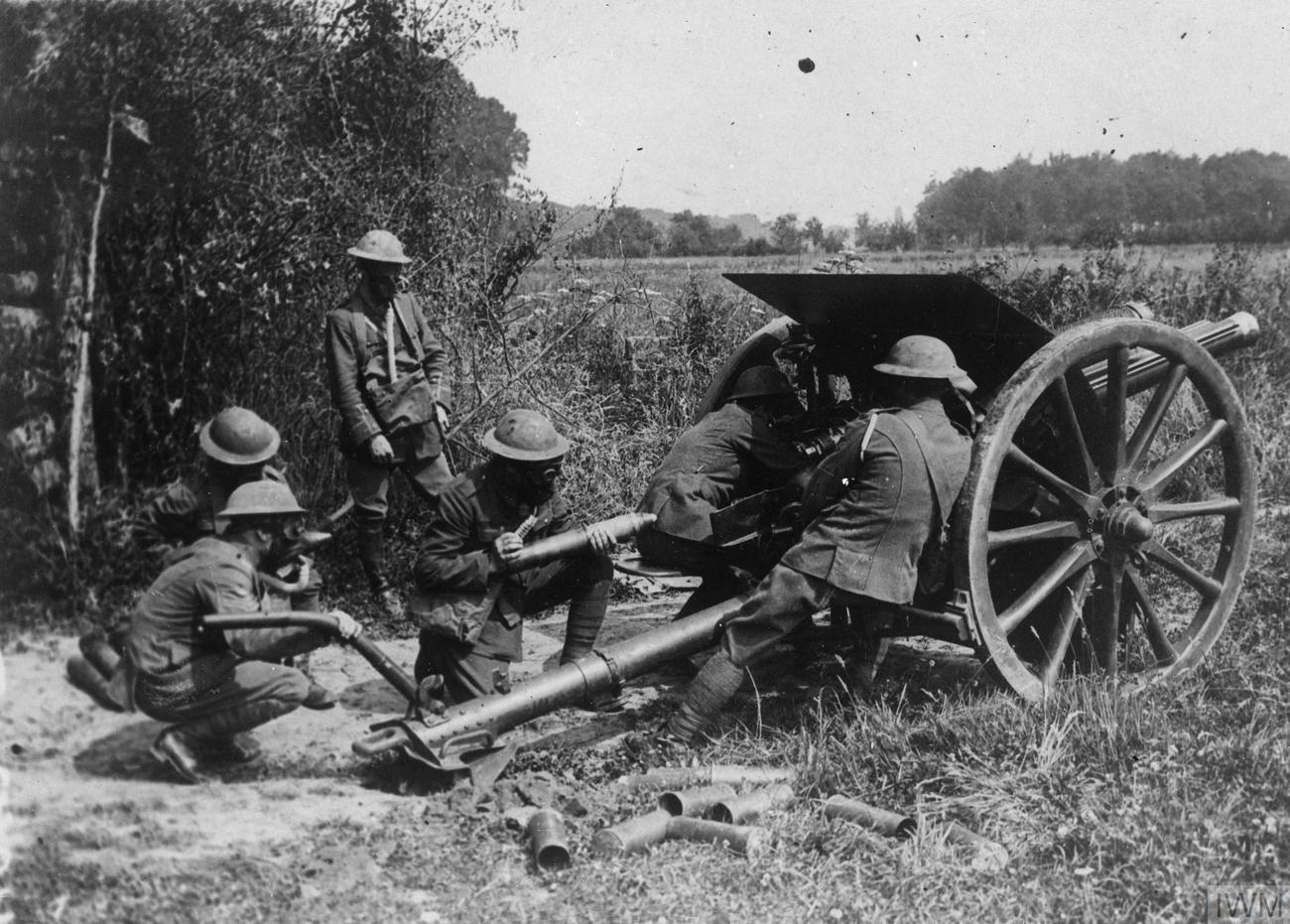
Gunners wearing Small box respirators firing an 18-pounder, August 1918.

Fourth Army launched the final Hundred Days Offensive at the Battle of Amiens on 8 August. As a result, the enemy began withdrawing from some positions in front of Third Army on 13 August, and 38th (W) DA was ordered to prepare to move forward to the Mesnil-Martinsart valley to support any advance by the infantry. On 18/19 the enemy withdrew from Aveluy Wood across the River Ancre and the artillery moved up as planned. The men of the TMBs helped the DAC to establish advanced ammunition dumps. Third Amy joined in the offensive with the Battle of Albert on 21 August. For the next three months 38th (W) DA was continually in action (Note: 'In Action' implies guns unlimbered and manned, ready to fire on receipt of orders, or actually carrying out a fire programme.) or moving forward into action, with one 72-hour rest. V Corps' role on 21 August was to push across the Ancre without committing to a costly attack. 38th (W) Division, crossing north of Albert, had only its own artillery for support. Zero was at 04.55, and the infantry's battle patrols moved off in thick fog 50 minutes later. 38th (W) DA fired a series of standing barrages together with harassing fire. The infantry were unable to find a way across the flooded and debris-choked river, but that night patrols of 14th Welsh got across and maintained themselves on the far bank for 48 hours. 15th Welsh also established posts across the river the next night. During the night of 23/24 August 38th (W) Divisional RE placed bridges across the Ancre and all the field artillery of 38th (W) DA and 62nd (2nd West Riding) DA crossed over to support the division's successful assault on the Thiepval heights beyond, continuing to Contalmaison and Mametz Wood over the next two days. 38th (W) DAC and the TMBs moved up to Albert and then established an ammunition replenishment point in the Usna Valley on 25 August. The TMBs tried out a trolley device to make the 6-inch Newton mortar more mobile and a party with two mortars followed the infantry to lend fire support.

V Corps advanced again on 27 August, 38th (W) Division moving off at 04.00. Longueval and Delville Wood were full of machine guns and the infantry only made limited progress. About 14.00 CXXII Bde was ordered up into close support behind their line. There was only one route it could take, a plank road across the plateau between Bazentin and Martinpuich in full view of the enemy. The first battery got through unscathed, but two German 'Five-Nine' batteries put down a 300 yards (270 m) deep barrage on the road, and the remaining batteries had to gallop by sections through the fire. Seven horse teams received direct hits, but all the guns got through and came into action a few hundred yards west of High Wood. The horse teams and limbers then had to gallop back through the barrage, which was not as heavy but still caused some casualties. The brigade was under fire from machine guns on the right flank and at 1,500 yards (1,400 m) range from a 77mm gun battery east of Longueval, but soon afterwards the brigade engaged a German counter-attack from Delville Wood over open sights at 1,000–1,500 yards (910–1,370 m) range and stopped it. Further counter-attacks were driven off by the combined fire of the artillery, infantry and machine gun companies.

V Corps kept pushing forwards across the old Somme battlefields, through Longueval, Delville Wood and Ginchy without much opposition, but 38th (W) Division was checked at Morval when it tried to advance without a barrage on 30 August. 38th (W) DA spent the next day in bombardment and harassing fire and the infantry attacked again on 1 September (the Second Battle of Bapaume) behind a creeping barrage fired by 38th (W) and 62nd (2nd WR) DAs. The barrage was in three parts, and the speed of planning was such that part one was already being fired when the part three orders arrived. 38th (W) DA fired over 1000 rounds per gun in the day. The DAC had progressively moved the replenishment point forward through Contalmaison, Pozières, Longueval and Mametz Wood, to Delville Wood. The infantry pushed as far forwards as Sailly-Saillisel, ahead of their neighbouring divisions, and the batteries of CXXII Bde followed up. Next day both brigades were positioned in the dead ground to support an attack on Mesnil on the night of 2/3 September. The attack failed and the gunners stood by to repel a counter-attack, but the enemy withdrew next day and the division followed up. That afternoon CXXII Bde came into action close behind the infantry as they moved up to the Canal du Nord; B and C Btys went up first, losing three guns as they crossed the open ground, but A and D (H) Btys were not spotted when they moved up later. The enemy were holding the far bank of the canal in strength and drove back V Corps' Cavalry, but the infantry forced their way across at several points on 4 September and 38th (W) DA advanced to come into action on the forward slope south of Mesnil. Casualties were low because the enemy's attention was focused on 17th (N) Division's simultaneous attack on the left. The infantry of 38th (W) Division were relieved on 5 September, but the artillery remained in action under 17th (N) DA; by 6 September it had fired over 300,000 rounds since the start of the offensive. The brigades crossed the canal on 7 September and came into action near Fins, supporting attacks by 21st Division on 'African Trench' on 9 September and the New Zealand Division on 11 September.

=== Hindenburg & Beaurevoir Lines ===
38th (W) Division returned to the line for the next attack (the Battle of Havrincourt) on 12 September as Third Army closed up to the formidable Hindenburg Line. In preparation, 38th (W) DAC took over from 17th (N) DAC. The mobile section of Newton mortars was placed under the direct orders of 115th Infantry Bde and as the rest of the TMBs prepared to support the attack they were joined by a party from V Corps Heavy TMB, who were to man four captured German Leichter Minenwerfers. However, 115th Infantry Bde's attack towards Gouzeaucourt was a failure, as was a second attempt. The batteries continued harassing fire and on the morning of 15 September fired a counter-preparation bombardment in anticipation of a counter-attack that never came. That night an enemy aircraft bombed 38th (W) DAC HQ, killing the Regimental Sergeant-Major, 8 other ranks (ORs) and 22 horses.

The orders for V Corps' next attack (the Battle of Épehy planned for 18 September) involved a 30-minute smokescreen fired by 4.5-inch howitzers, a 'hurricane' bombardment by trench mortars, a creeping barrage of 18-pdrs, a searching barrage of 18-pdrs and 4.5-inch howitzers, as well as long-range barrages by heavy artillery. 38th (W) TMBs, reinforced by Y/17 Bty, had assembled 18 Newtons and 8 Minenwerfers, and while CXXII Bde fought under 17th (N) DA, 38th (W) DA was reinforced by LXXVIII and LXXIX Bdes from 17th (N) DA, XCIII and CLV AFA Bdes, and XVII (Mixed) Bde, RGA, in addition to CXXI Bde. These were pushed forward, CXXI and LXXIX Bdes on 15 September, the two AFA brigades the following day, and registered on their targets with observation aircraft. The remaining guns came into action on the night of 17/18 September. When the attack was launched at 05.20 114th Infantry Bde took its first objective easily, but 113th Infantry Bde was held up and then driven back off its objective. A 30-minute bombardment at 15.20 enabled that brigade to regain most of its first objective, but 38th (W) Division was not ready in time for the renewal of the advance under moonlight that night, though the guns fired in support of 17th (N) Division.

On 21 September 38th (W) Division was relieved in the line by 33rd Division; from this date until the end of the war the two divisions together formed the right of V Corps, the infantry leapfrogging each other as they advanced. The CRA of whichever division was in the lead (Brig-Gens G.W.H. Nicholson (33rd) and T.E. Topping (38th)) commanded both divisional artilleries; 33rd (Camberwell) DA comprised CLVI and CLXII (Camberwell) Bdes. No 3 (SAA) Section of 38th (W) DAC remained with Divisional HQ, supplying the infantry and machine gun companies.

38th (W) Division was in reserve for the attack against the Hindenburg Line (the Battle of the St Quentin Canal), but the field brigades and TMBs fired in support of 5th and 21st Divisions' preparatory attacks on Gouzeaucourt on 27 and 28 September, then came under 33rd DA just before Zero (05.30) for the main assault (by Fourth Army) on 29 September. The Hindenburg Line having been breached, the Germans began withdrawing to the defences of the Beaurevoir Line, followed by the British, the TMBs being taken forward by motor lorries. Over the following days 33rd Division probed forward against rearguards, field artillery sections and mobile mortar sections operating with the infantry to shell strongpoints, 38th (W) DA with No 1 Section of the DAC operating under the command of 33rd DA. On the night of 4/5 October 38 (W) Division took the lead and 124th Field Company and 19th Welsh (Glamorgan Pioneers) got 38th (W) DA, 33rd DA and XXXIV AFA Bde across the St Quentin Canal. In preparation for the next attack (the Second Battle of Cambrai) 38th (W) DA set up its HQ in the old Hindenburg Line on 7 October and XIII (Mobile) Bde, RGA, was attached to it in addition to its own and 33rd DA's field guns. The guns began cutting the extensive wire of the Beaurevoir system. Zero hour was 01.00 on 8 October and four separate creeping barrages were arranged, supporting 113th Infantry Bde, the left and right battalions of 115th Infantry Bde, and later 114th Infantry Bde. 115th Bde gained entry into the Beaurevoir Line, but 113th Bde was held up by the wire, which had not been cut at all. As a result, 114th Bde's attack (due at 08.00) was postponed until 11.30 to give it time to fight its way to its assigned starting line. The batteries were also held up, and only had 90 minutes to move forward to support this attack; nevertheless they delivered the planned creeping barrage. 115th Brigade then began the second phase of its own attack, with 17th (2nd North Wales) Bn RWF on the left. Major A.D.C. Clarke, commanding C/CXXII Bty, accompanied this battalion and had an intact telephone line back to his battery, by which he directed its fire into the enemy's trench while the RWF attacked with the assistance of 11th Bn, Tank Corps. The RA regimental history describes this as a 'brilliant little action' whereby guns and tanks operated together to 'carry' the infantry into Villers-Outréaux. After the division's successful advance of about 5,000 yards (4,600 m), CXXII and CLVI Brigades moved up west of Malincourt and XIII RGA Bde to Villers-Outréaux.

=== Pursuit to the Selle & Sambre ===
That night 33rd Division was ordered to pass through 38th (W) Division, and to advance next morning on a one-brigade front. 19th Infantry Bde took the lead as a brigade group, which included both field brigades and the mobile mortar section of 38th (W) DA, as well as XCIV Bde (21st DA) and CLVI Bde (33rd DA), E Squadron, North Irish Horse (V Corps Cyclist Battalion), 11th Field Co, RE, and C Company, 33rd Battalion, Machine Gun Corps. This mobile group set off at 02.00 and reached the outskirts of Malincourt just after a delayed action mine left by the Germans destroyed the road, imposing a delay on the wheeled vehicles. CLVI Brigade was assigned to close support and fired as the infantry crossed their start line at 05.20, then moved ahead with them. CXXII Brigade advanced rapidly through the lifting fog and finally caught up with 5th Scottish Rifles as they reached Clary. The batteries deployed hidden behind the crest of a ridge 1,500 yards (1,400 m) and fired under voice control and short telephone links from their OPs on the crest to support the Rifles' attack. From these positions they could observe and shell the Germans retreating away from the village towards Bertry. The German rearguard held onto a ridge beyond the village, and as 19th Bde and some British cavalry moved in to attack them Lt-Col MacLellan sent Maj A.H. Peskett forward with C/CXXI Bty for close support work, shelling the enemy out of a cornfield where they had been holding up the advance. Later CXXII Bde arrived, but often the batteries were unable to fire because of uncertainty over the relative positions of the British and German troops, as well as difficulty in bringing the ammunition so far forward, which 330th HT Co was forced to do under enemy shellfire. In the afternoon CXXII Bde followed the infantry through Clary and came into action 700 yards (640 m) from Bertry; Lt-Col Williams estimated the brigade's total advance that day as 11,300 yards (10,300 m). Clary was the first place where the troops encountered liberated French civilians in large numbers, and were given an enthusiastic welcome.

During the subsequent pursuit to the River Selle on 10 October CXXII Bde advanced ahead of the infantry of 33rd Division, following 7th Cavalry Bde. The three 18-pdr batteries came into action north of the Le Cateau–Cambrai road and the howitzer battery 600 yards (550 m) to the south, with their OPs on the high ground to the east. The OPs could see the enemy retreating north-eastwards towards and across the river. The range to these targets was long, so before the west bank of the river was fully cleared, Maj Clarke and C/CXXII Bty was ordered another 1,000 yards (910 m) forwards. As No 1 Sub-section surmounted a ridge in full view of the enemy it came under heavy shell fire and the horse team of the battery waggon was brought down. A further 200 yards (180 m) down the forward slope No 1 Gun team tripped and fell. However, the gun was rapidly extricated while the rest of the battery galloped safely into action. It then fired on columns of enemy transport and troops retiring over the high ground beyond the river. The battery maintained itself there all afternoon, the gun teams and battery waggons withdrawn to comparative safety, replenishing the ammunition limbers at the guns whenever there was a lull in the enemy's fire. 33rd DA's batteries also worked their way up onto the high ground commanding the river. Although the cavalry suffered severe casualties from the strong enemy rearguards 98th Infantry Bde of 33rd Division, supported by CXXI Bde, pushed on and got patrols across the river that night.

Supply problems now forced a pause before the Battle of the Selle could be launched. Although 33rd Division obtained bridgeheads across the river on 12 October, there was insufficient ammunition for a regular barrage, the guns merely firing on targets of opportunity. 38th (W) DA at Bertry took command of the two division's combined artillery on 14 October and for the next week the guns and mortars supported 38th (W) Division as it prepared for the attack, bombarding enemy positions along the railway embankment beyond the river, preventing working parties from repairing the wire, and firing gas shells into dead ground likely to shelter enemy troops. CXXII Brigade was flooded out of its bivouacs on 16 October and moved into Troisvilles, which was subjected to crash barrages by the enemy. That night the Germans put down a heavy mustard gas bombardment on the battery positions: D (H)/CXXII Bty and CXXI Bde suffered worst, 12 officers and 100 ORs of CXXI becoming casualties, so the TMBs lent it some gunners next day. The neighbouring Fourth Army attacked on 17 October, 38th (W) DA firing a smokescreen and a fake barrage to assist them. That night B/CXXII Bty's waggon lines were bombed by aircraft, 30 horses being killed and 20 injured, and next morning shelling drove the gun detachments to take shelter. ref name = Becke33/>

V Corps resumed its advance at 02.00 on 20 October, with 38th (W) Division carrying out a deliberate attack across the Selle in heavy rain. There was no preliminary bombardment, and the barrage came down at zero, resting on the initial line (the railway) for 4 minutes, then advancing by lifts of 100 yards (91 m) every four minutes. This was slow enough to allow the infantry to scramble up the slippery embankment in the dark. A 'protector' barrage paused on each of the objectives as the infantry dug in, before moving on as the next wave leap-frogged through. In addition the DTMO had four Newton mortars assisting the infantry brigades' light trench mortars firing on certain localities as the barrage progressed. 114th Infantry Bde took all of its objectives after overcoming some opposition along the railway: the slow creeping barrage was reported to be extremely accurate. 123rd Field Company, RE, immediately began constructing artillery bridges over the Selle and a section of C/CXXII Bty was pushed across that evening (Maj Clarke was wounded soon afterwards), while all the batteries of CXXI and CXXII Bdes moved up to the river that night. On 21 October they were joined by CCXXIII Bde of 63rd (RN) DA. During the moonlit night of 21/22 October the two 38th (W) DA field brigades went across and formed up immediately beyond the river before dawn, cramped close behind the infantry, while 33rd DA's guns remained deployed on the west side. CXXI Brigade liaised with 113th Infantry Bde in front with CLVI Bde attached behind, while CXXII was with 115th Infantry Bde with CLXII attached; X/38 TMB was at the disposal of 19th Infantry Bde. At this point 38th (W) DAC was having to bring up food supplies for the troops, because so many drivers of the divisional train were out of action due to the Spanish flu epidemic. The guns remained under fire on 22 October, but those of 33rd DA crossed the river and once again took charge as 33rd Division resumed the lead. It attacked Forest and Ovillers at 11.00 on 23 October covered by fire from the five brigades under its command (33rd DA, 38th (W) DA and one from 63rd (RN) DA), and with two 6-inch mortars moving up with each infantry brigade. CXXI and CXXII Bdes then moved forward, CXXII setting up its HQ in the slaughterhouse. However the situation was unclear and the gunners could do little firing to support the infantry. On 24 October 33rd Division attacked towards Le Quesnoy supported by the four brigades of the two divisions firing bursts and then moving forwards, but without a full barrage the attack failed to take its final objective of Englefontaine. The guns kept up fire on all exits from the village, and at 01.00 on 26 October the division attacked again behind a thick barrage by the five brigades, 10 per cent of which was gas shells. Nicholson had to work out all the details himself because all the staff of 33rd DA had been laid low by Spanish flu, but the operation was a complete success.

38th (W) Divisional and RA HQs moved up behind this advance, reaching Richemont on 26 October, where Topping and his 38th (W) DA staff relieved Nicholson that night. All four field brigades withdrew at dusk for a 72-hour rest, but Maj Thompson of B/CXXI Bty was killed while getting his waggons under cover. 38th (W) TMBs established their HQ at Croix, with the mobile TM section at Cayeaux, while 38th (W) DAC reached Bertry. The field brigades returned to the line on 29 October as V Corps prepared to attack through the Forêt de Mormal towards the River Sambre, and CXXI Bde carried out a gas shoot on the night of 30/31 October. On 31 October the TMBs were ordered to concentrate all 12 mortars in the Englefontaine sector to destroy the various hedges and orchards screening the enemy position at the edge of the forest. They moved up and reconnoitred positions, opening fire on 2 and 3 November and suffering heavy casualties from return fire. The combined artillery then began preparation for the Battle of the Sambre. 38th (Welsh) Division launched the attack into the forest at 05.30 on 4 November. 115th Infantry Bde had some hard fighting at the edge of the wood, being unable to follow the barrage as closely as usual because the gunners were using Shrapnel shells to burst in the treetops, with the danger of some friendly shells bursting above the attackers. The creeping shrapnel barrage was preceded by another with HE and Thermite shells. The leading battalions were supported by sections of 18-pdrs advancing with them. Then 113th Infantry Bde took over the lead, the mobile section of 38th (W) TMBs advancing with 16th RWF twice coming into action. Its second shoot, 18 rounds on some high ground ahead, caused the enemy to flee. Once 113th Infantry Bde had taken the second objective the artillery moved up, 38th (W) and 33rd DA working forward one battery at a time to maintain the barrage. The mobile TM section got their heavy weapons up to the 'Brown Line' objective at 14.30, and opened fire on the houses at Grand Patures. Bringing the field guns up through the fallen trees along roads deliberately cratered by the enemy was difficult, but they provided a barrage to support 114th Infantry Bde onto the final objective, which was gained just before dark. The Division's engineers and pioneers were put to work making the roads through the forest passable for the artillery. 33rd Division, which had been following closely, completed the advance through the forest on 5 November. Although harassing fire was kept up before the attack, the guns were now forbidden to use HE shell for fear of causing casualties to French civilians sheltering in the villages. The advance was made without a barrage, sections of guns moving up with each battalion, but it was effective, the Germans retreating across the Sambre and destroying the bridges. By 10.30 the leading infantry were crossing the river, but the guns could not follow.

By dawn on 7 November a rough bridge allowed 33rd DA to get the first guns across the Sambre, while 38th (W) DA's field brigades acted as an improvised DAC, bringing up and dumping ammunition for 33rd DA until the respective DACs could struggle through the forest. A/CXXII and D (H)/CXXII Btys each lost an ammunition waggon falling off the rough bridge. The TMBs reached Berlaimont on the river, where they remained, apart from the mobile section which continued to follow the advance. The first battery of 38th (W) DA to get over was D (H)/CXXI at Berlaimont on 8 November, the rest of CXXI Bde crossing at Sassegnies early on 9 November. As advanced guard, 113th Infantry Bde pushed steadily forward through Dourlers supported by CXXI Bde, reaching Wattignies-la-Victoire on 10/11 November without much sign of the enemy. The Armistice with Germany came into force at 11.00 next morning.

=== Post-Armistice ===
After the armistice, CXXI Bde went into billets at Dourlers while CXXII Bde remained at the river in 33rd Division's area. Since 7 November 38 (W) DA HQ and the TMBs had been established at Aulnoye, where the rest of the division's infantry had gone into billets after leaving the forest. The mobile TM section also withdrew to Aulnoye, and the DAC arrived on 14 November. Finally CXXII and CXXI Bdes rejoined on 15 and 20 November. Here they remained into December while demobilisation began, with coal miners being released first. The men of the TMBs were employed in. salvaging ammunition around Englefontaine. At the end of the year 38th (W) DA was ordered back to winter quarters at Pont-Noyelles, near Amiens. Apart from the TMBs, which went by rail, the rest of 38th (W) DA began a road march on 28 December, reaching Albert on 31 December and going into billets around Montigny and Behencourt, with CXXI Bde in huts at Pont-Noyelles. Demobilisation accelerated during January 1919. The TMBs were reduced to cadre strength on 31 January and their remaining personnel were absorbed into the DAC on 10 February. By the end of March all the units had been reduced to cadre and moved to Glisy where the guns and waggons were parked. Brigadier-Gen Topping left for England on 24 March and the Brigade major, Maj J.E. Marston, assumed command of the remaining cadres. Lieutenant-Col Hayward of the DAC left for England on 18 April 1919, having commanded it since it was formed. On 21 May the cadres of CXXI and CXXII Bdes sent a detachment of retained men to a reinforcement camp (probably for posting to British Army of the Rhine (BAOR)) and then left for England and disbandment.

== CXIX Army Field Artillery Brigade ==
CXIX Brigade formally left 38th (W) DA on 14 January 1917 and became an independent Army Field Artillery (AFA) brigade with No 3 Section of 38th (W) DAC as its BAC. In fact it remained at Elverdinge attached to 38th (W) Division until 21 May, when it went for rest. Indeed, Lt-Col Paterson continued to command Left Group of 38th (W) DA and acted as CRA of 38th (W) Division for part of May. The brigade took part in the Battle of Messines in June and the Second Battle of Passchendaele in November. It served with Second Army throughout 1918, including the Battle of the Lys and the final advance in Flanders. It was disbanded in June 1919.

== 38th (Welsh) Heavy Battery ==
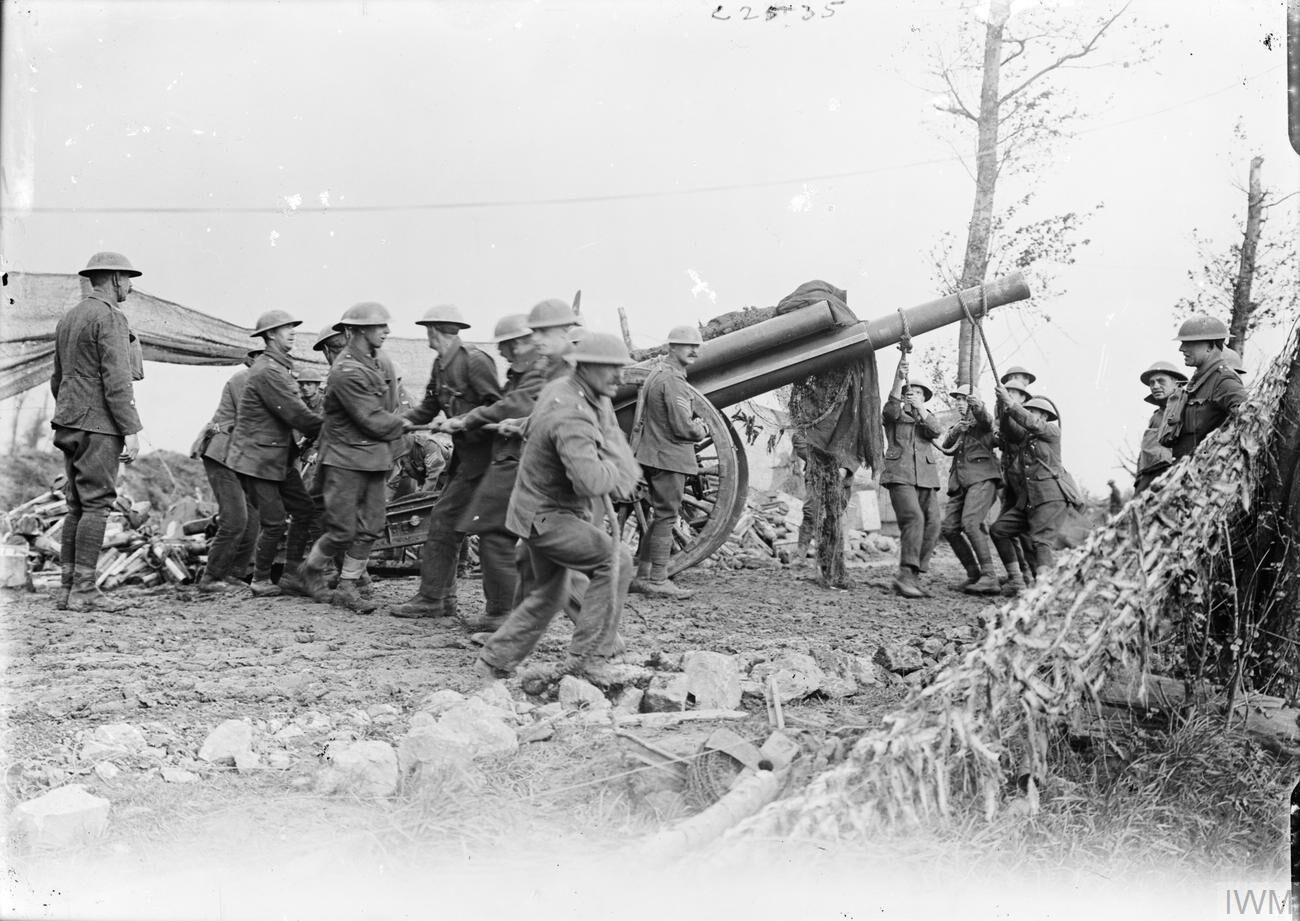
Moving a 60-pounder gun out of its emplacement, 1917.

38th (Welsh) Heavy Battery and its ammunition column had been formed within 38th (W) DA, but by June 1915 policy had changed and heavy batteries were removed from divisional establishments and formed into Heavy Brigades, RGA. 38th Heavy Bty joined 42nd Heavy Bde at Bordon Camp on 2 March 1916, mobilised with it on 8 March and embarked at Southampton Docks on 27 March. It landed at Le Havre in France on 30 March. RGA brigades were redesignated as Heavy Artillery Groups (HAGs) during April, without change of numeral. HAGs had a more fluid organisation, and batteries were frequently switched between them. The 60-pdr batteries were used for counter-battery (CB) fire. After serving in a quiet sector with First Army, 38th (W) Hvy Bty joined Third Army and served with it during the Battle of Arras in April–May 1917. Afterwards it was moved north to Fifth Army to participate in the Ypres Offensive, returning to Third Army for the Battle of Cambrai. At the end of 1917 the battery joined 63rd HAG, and a reversal of policy saw HAGs converted back into permanent RGA brigades. 38th (Welsh) Hvy Bty served with 63rd (Mobile) Bde for the remainder of the war, against the German Spring Offensive and in the final Hundred Days Offensive. After the war, 38th Bty, RGA (it dropped the 'Heavy' designation on 16 April 1919) was redesignated as 38th Mountain Bty, RGA on 7 January 1920 and on 16 April it was absorbed into the cadre of 2nd Mountain Bty to reform that Regular Army unit.

== Commanders ==
The following officers commanded 38th (Welsh) Divisional Artillery and its units during the war:

CRA

- Brig-Gen W.A.M. Thompson, CB, CMG, July 1915–20 March 1918
- Lt-Col P.J. Paterson (CXIX Bde), acting 9–11 May 1917
- Lt-Col E.C. Pottinger (CLXIX AFA Bde), acting 23–27 October 1917
- Lt-Col W.C.E. Rudkin, CMG, DSO, (CXXII Bde), acting 27 October–22 November 1917 and 20 March–1 April 1918
- Brig-Gen T.E. Topping, 1 April 1918 – 24 March 1919
- Maj J.E. Marston, commanding 38th (W) DA cadres from 24 March 1919

Brigade Major

- Capt (later Maj) C. Geldard, before January 1916–May 1917 (to RA HQ staff VIII Corps)
- Maj J.E. Marston, 3 June 1917–March 1919

CXIX Brigade

- Lt-Col P.J. Paterson, November 1915–March 1919

CXX Brigade

- Lt-Col C.O. Head, from May 1916

CXXI Brigade

- Lt-Col F.A. Tighe, July–November 1915
- Lt-Col H.G. Pringle, November 1915–24 March 1917 (invalided)
- Lt-Col G.P. MacClennan, March 1917–28 February 1919 (to India)

CXXII Brigade

- Lt-Col J. Gardner, February–November 1915
- Lt-Col W.C.E. Rudkin, DSO, CMG, November 1915–27 October 1917; 22 November 1917 – 20 March 1918, 1–8 April 1918 (gassed), 16–19 April 1918 (invalided) (became CRA of 57th (2nd West Lancashire) Division August 1918)
- Maj R.S. Archer, MC (B/CXXII Bty), acting October–25 November 1917, December 1917, 20 March–1 April
- Lt-Col B.W.H Moss, acting 25 November–31 December 1917
- Maj W.A.C. Stone (A/CXXII Bty), acting 8–16 April 1918
- Lt-Col R.C. Williams, 19 April 1918 – 12 March 1919 (to LXV AFA Bde with BAOR)

38th (W) DAC

- Lt-Col G.W. Hayward, July 1915–18 April 1919

38th (W) TMBs

- Capt O.J. Jones, DTMO, July 1917–January 1919

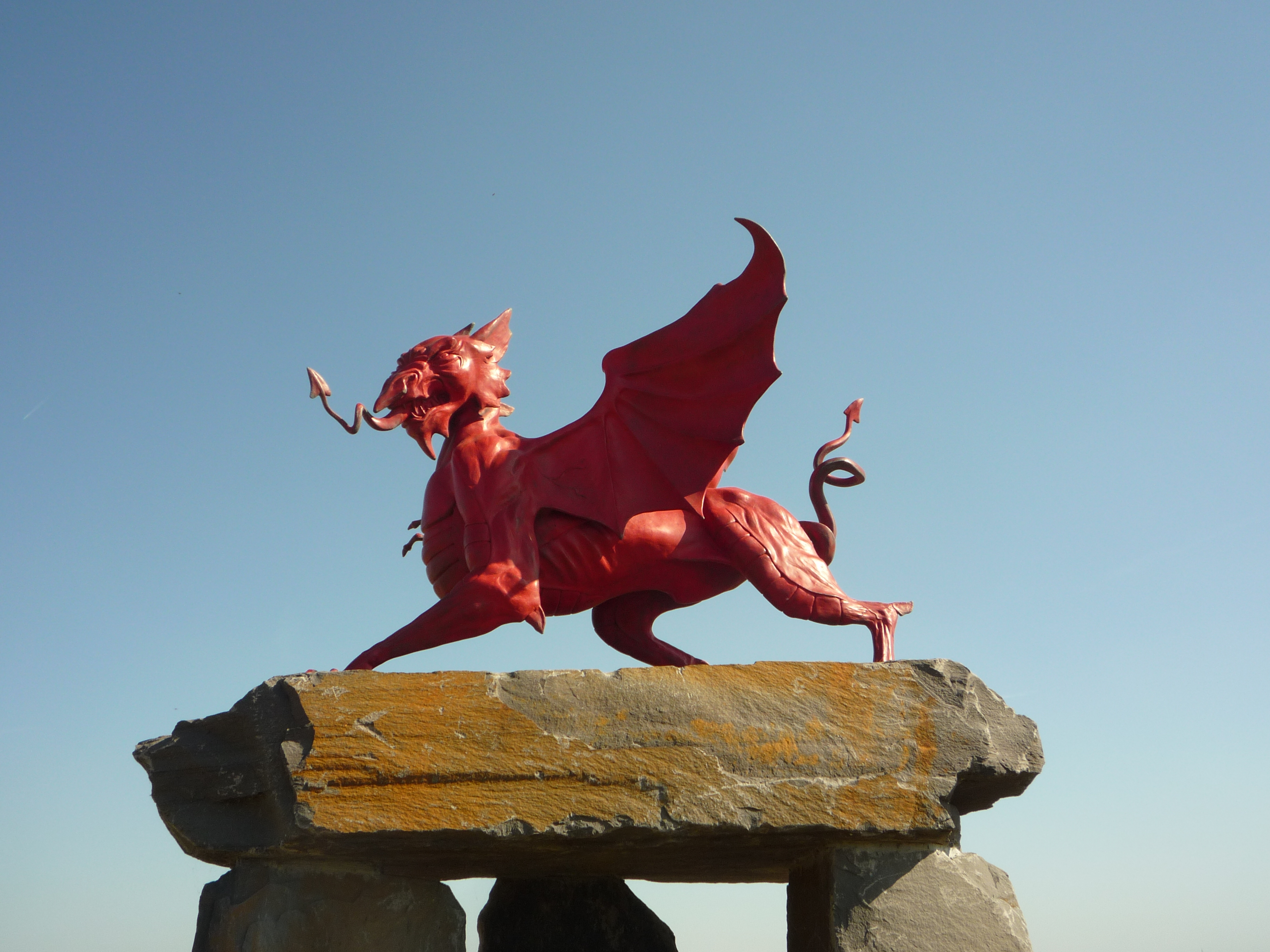
The Red Dragon of Wales atop the Cromlech of stones at the Welsh Memorial Park, Ypres.

== Memorials ==
A white marble memorial plaque to the dead of 38th (Welsh) Divisional Artillery, with the RA badge above and the division's dragon badge below, was placed in Cardiff City Hall after the war. It was later moved to its present location in Llandaff Cathedral.

Red dragon sculptures commemorating the service of the 38th (Welsh) Division have been erected at the Mametz Wood Memorial (1987) and at Welsh Memorial Park, Ypres, on Pilckem Ridge (2014).
