= 85th Regiment =

85th Regiment or 85th Infantry Regiment may refer to:

- 85th Regiment of Foot (disambiguation), several units of the British Army
- 85th Burman Rifles, a unit of the British Indian Army
- 85th Armoured Regiment (India)
- 85th Infantry Regiment (United States)

== Union Army (American Civil War) ==
- 85th Illinois Infantry Regiment
- 85th Indiana Infantry Regiment
- 85th Ohio Infantry Regiment
- 85th Pennsylvania Infantry Regiment

== See also ==
- 85th Division (disambiguation)
