= 85th Civil Affairs Brigade =

85th Civil Affair Brigade
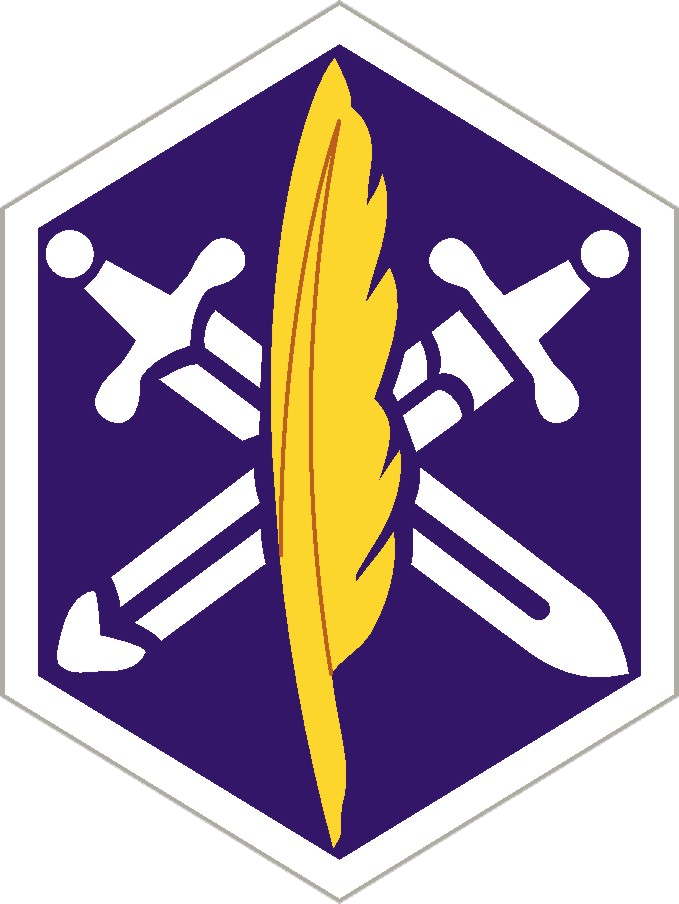
- Active: 1976-2018
- Country: United States
- Allegiance: III Corps
- Branch: US Army
- Type: Civil Affairs
- Size: Brigade
- Garrison/HQ: Fort Hood, Texas
- Final Commander: Lt. Col. Nicholas J. Dickson
- Final Command Sergeant Major: CSM Aldo Palacios

Insignia
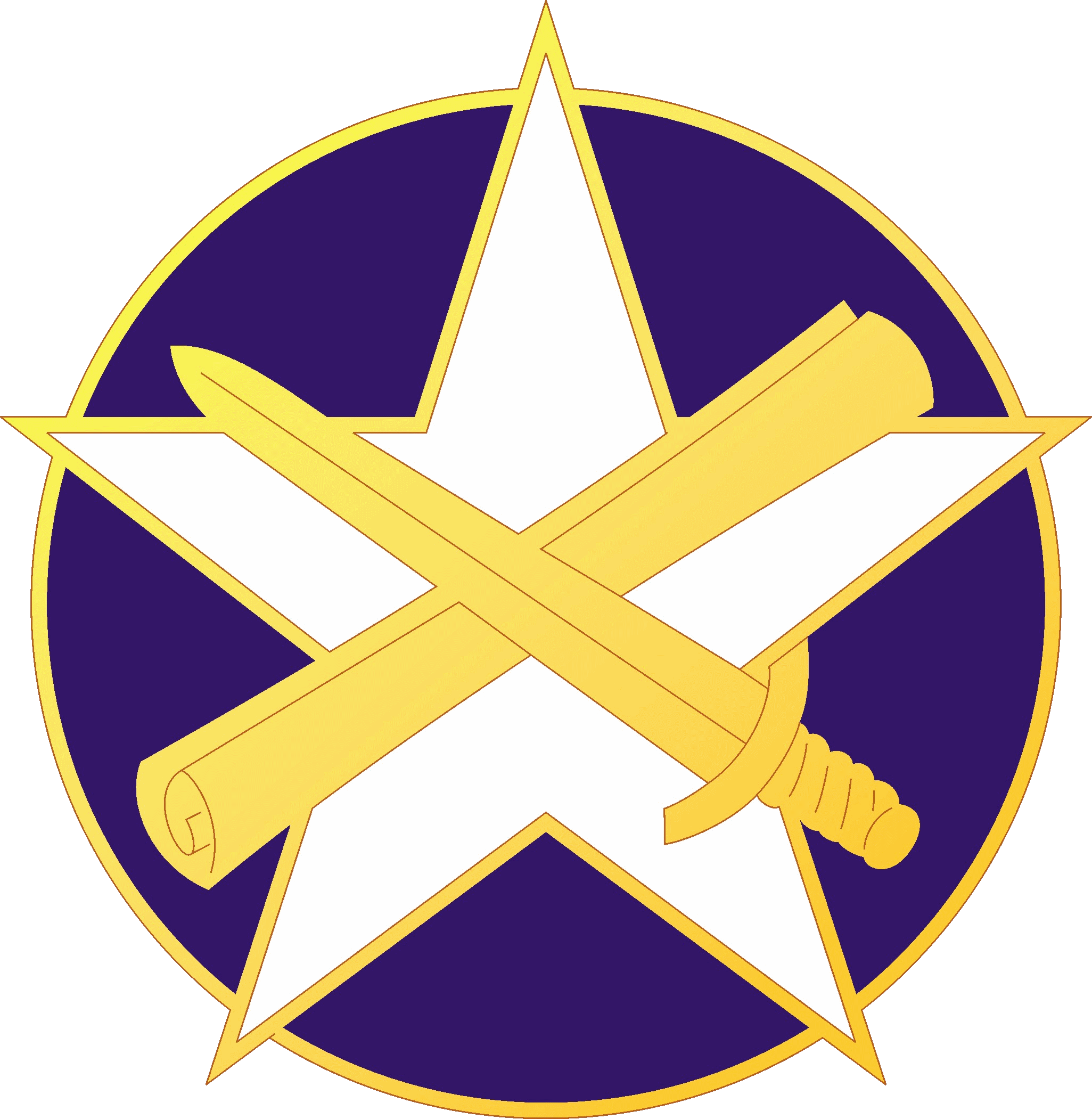
- 85th Civil Affairs Brigade DUI

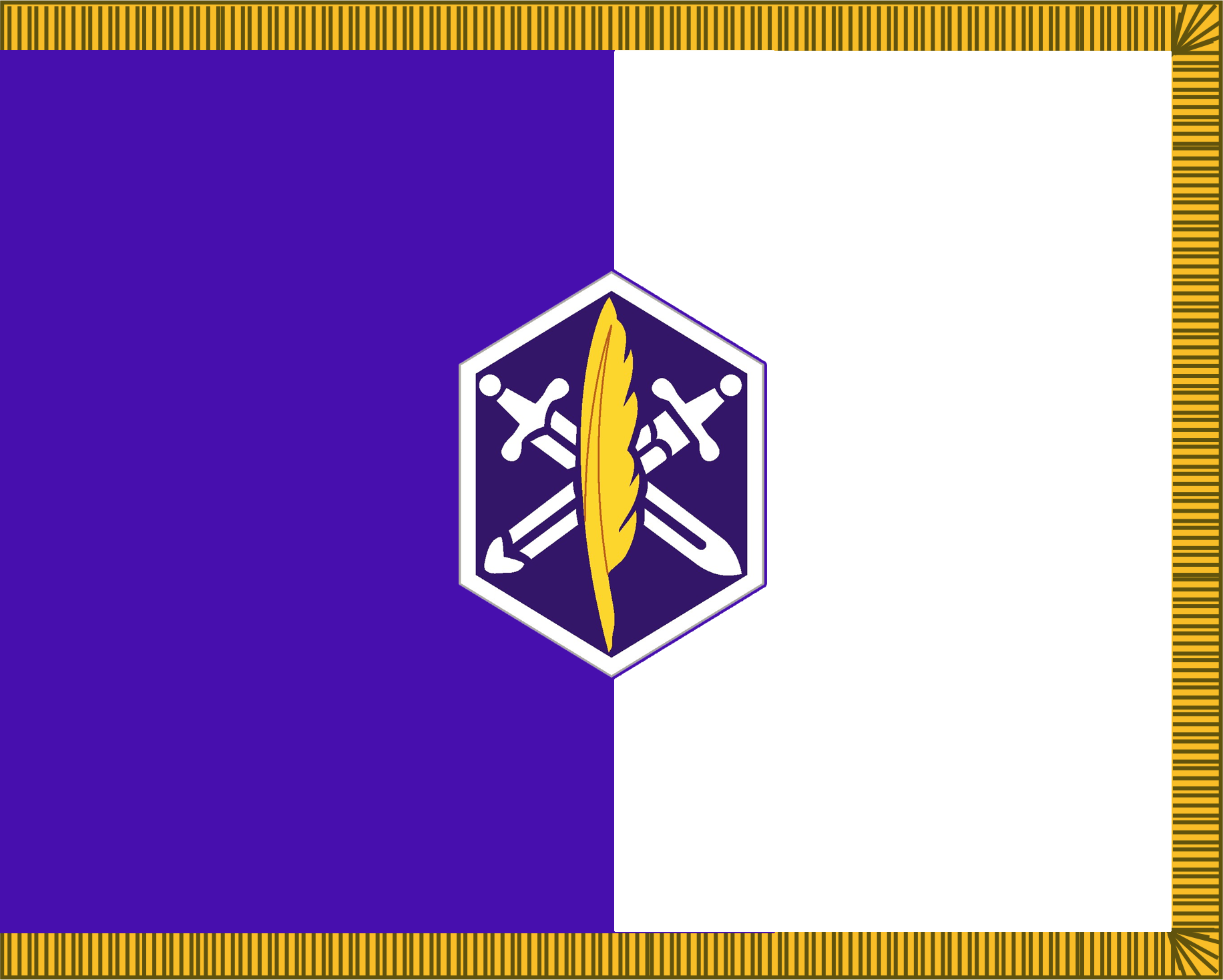
- 85th Civil Affairs Brigade Flag

The 85th Civil Affairs Brigade was a unit of the US Army that was first organized January 1966 in the Army Reserve as Headquarters and Headquarters Company, 362nd Civil Affairs Area in Dallas, Texas. It was redesignated as Headquarters and Headquarters Company, 362nd Civil Affairs Brigade in June 1975 and deactivated in September 1979.

In September 2009 it was designated as Headquarters and Headquarters Company, 85th Civil Affairs Brigade at Fort Hood, Texas as a Regular Army unit. The unit was deactivated in 2018.

== Subordinate Units ==
- 81st Civil Affairs Battalion at Fort Hood, Tx.
- 82nd Civil Affairs Battalion at Fort Stewart, Ga.
- 83rd Civil Affairs Battalion at Fort Bragg, NC
- 80th Civil Affairs Battalion at Fort Bliss, Tx.
- 84th Civil Affairs Battalion at Joint Base Lewis-McChord, Wash.
