= 85th Regiment of Foot (disambiguation) =

Three regiments of the British Army have been numbered the 85th Regiment of Foot:

- 85th Regiment of Foot (Royal Volunteers), raised in 1759
- 85th Regiment of Foot (Westminster Volunteers), raised in 1779
- 85th Regiment of Foot (Bucks Volunteers), raised in 1793
