= 120th Brigade =

120th Brigade may refer to:

== Belarus ==
- 120th Guards Mechanised Brigade of the Belarusian Ground Forces

== Egypt ==
- 120th Infantry Brigade (Egypt), part of the Operation Badr (1973) order of battle

== Japan ==
- 120th Independent Mixed Brigade, part of the Fifty-Fourth Army (Japan)

== Russia ==
- 120th Artillery Brigade (Russia), of the Siberian Military District of the Russian Ground Forces

== Ukraine ==
- 120th Territorial Defense Brigade, a unit of the Ukrainian Territorial Defense Forces

== United Kingdom ==
- 120th Brigade (United Kingdom)
- 120th Brigade, Royal Field Artillery, a British Army unit 1915–16

== United States ==
- 120th Infantry Brigade (United States) of the US Army

== See also ==
- 120th Division (disambiguation)
- 120th Regiment (disambiguation)
