= 85th Armoured Regiment (India) =

Indian Army regiment

- Active: 1976 – present
- Country: India
- Allegiance: India
- Branch: Indian Army
- Type: Armour
- Size: Regiment
- Mottos: सर्वदा विजयी Sarvada Vijayee (Always victorious)
- Colors: Black and yellow
- March: Sare Jahan Se Accha Hindustan Hamara
- Equipment: T-72

Commanders
- Colonel of the Regiment: General Dhiraj Seth

Insignia
- Abbreviation: 85 Armd Regt

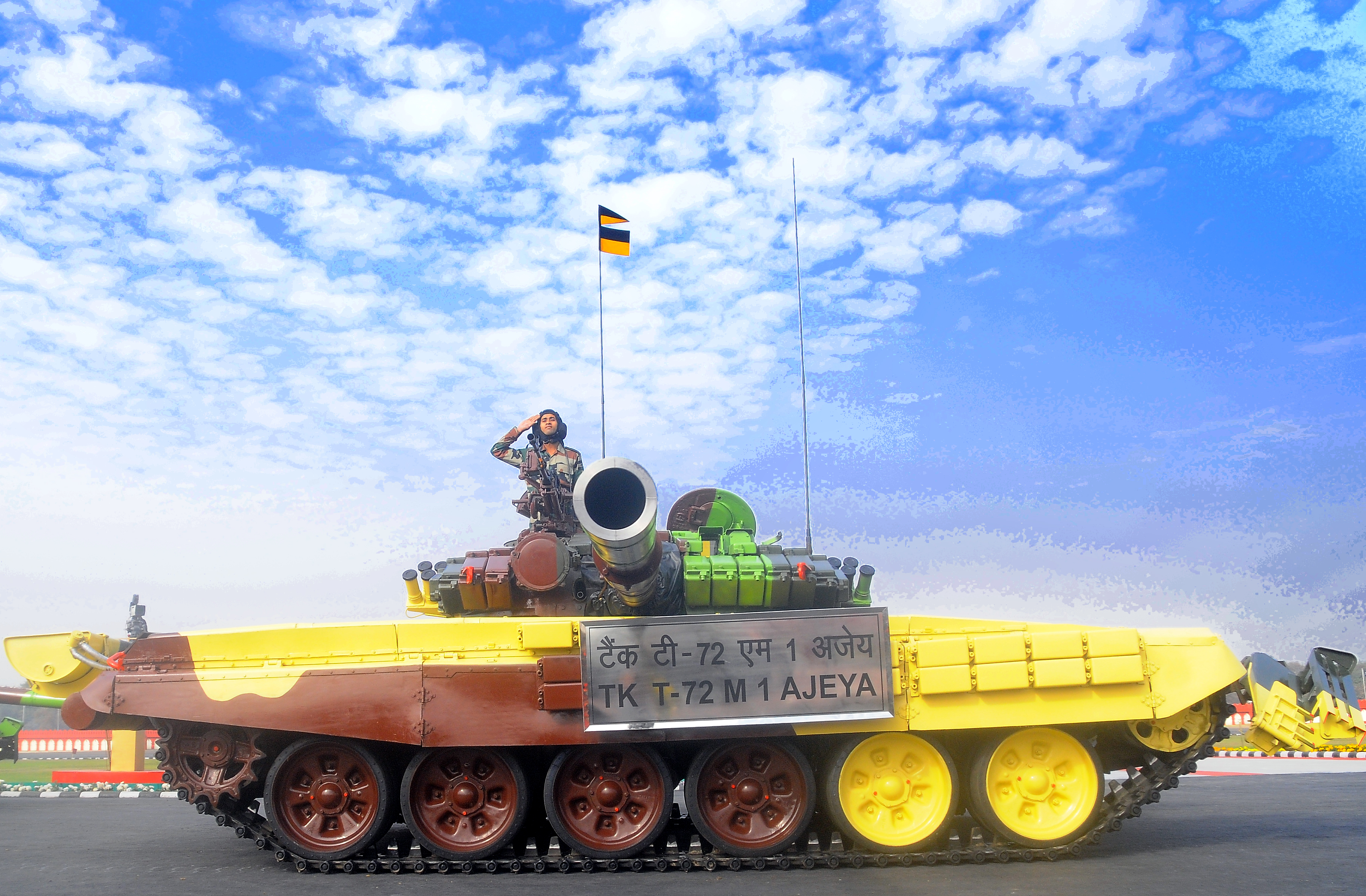
T-72 M 1 Ajeya of 85th Armoured Regiment during the Army Day Parade-2012

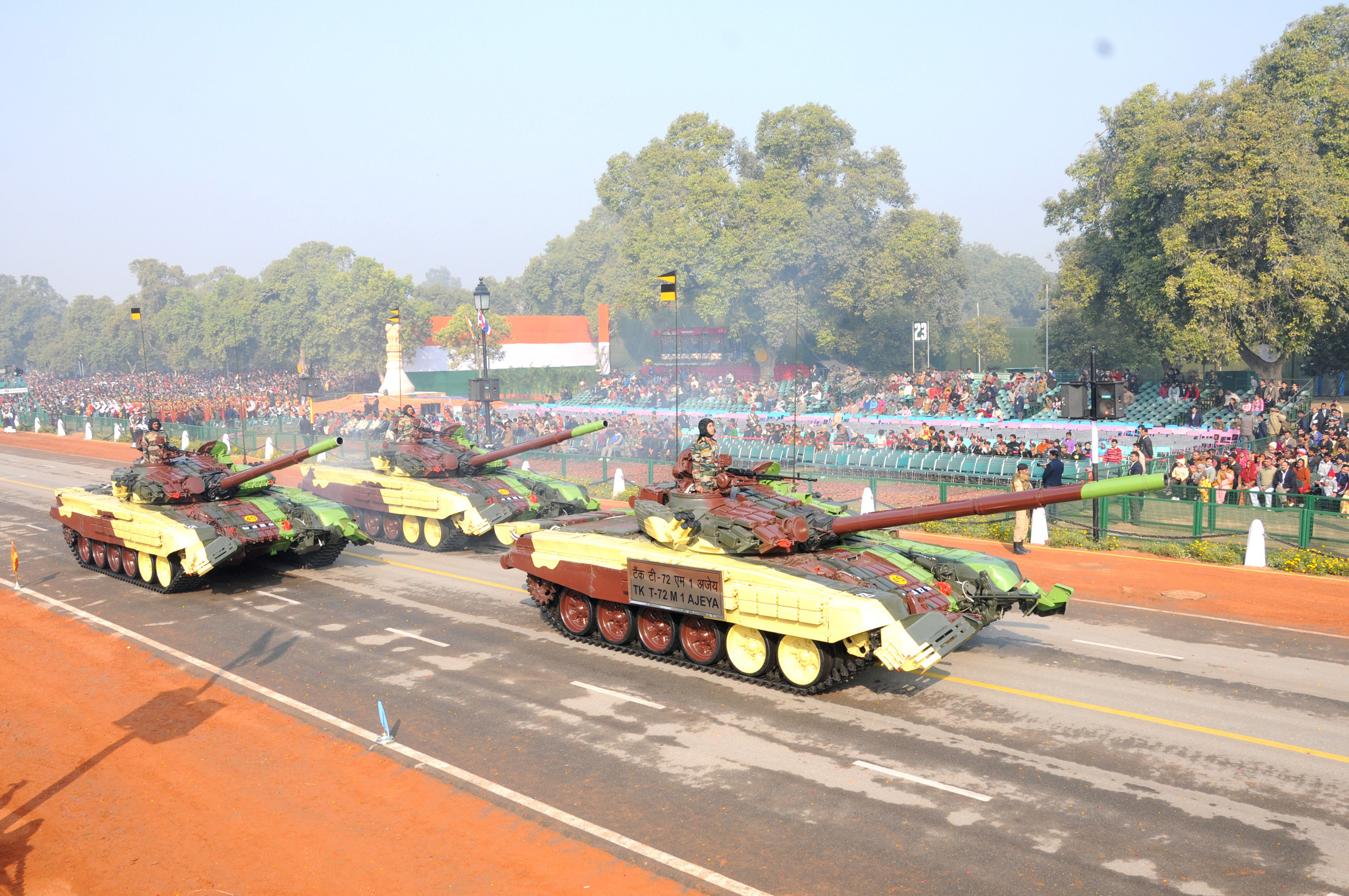
T-72 M 1 Ajeya of 85th Armoured Regiment passes through the Rajpath during the full dress rehearsal for the Republic Day Parade-2012

85th Armoured Regiment, is an armoured regiment which is part of the Armoured Corps of the Indian Army.

== Formation ==
The regiment was raised on 1 October 1976 by Lt Col D.P. Singh at Ahmednagar. It is an all-India mixed-class regiment, which was initially equipped with Vijayanta tanks. The first Colonel of the regiment was Maj Gen K.M. Dhody, AVSM.

== History ==
The regiment took part in Operation Trident in 1987, in counter-insurgency operations in Jammu and Kashmir and in Punjab during Operation Rakshak, Operation Vijay and Operation Parakram. It has been deployed in Nyoma in Ladakh following the attempts by the PLA to carry out incursions into Indian territory.

The Regiment had the honour of participating in the annual Republic Day parade in 1978 with Vijayanta tanks and in 2007 and 2012 with T-72 tanks.

== Equipment ==
The Regiment which had the Vijayanta tanks at the time of raising was one of first regiments in India to convert to the T-72 tanks in 1991.

== Awards and decorations ==
Major Deepak Padda was awarded the Shaurya Chakra posthumously in 2006 for his gallant action against terrorists, while attached with 14 Grenadiers during counter terrorist operations in Kupwara . Major B Chakraborty, Sowar Deba Yadav and Acting Lance Daffadar B Nitendra Kumar were awarded the Sena Medal for gallantry during Operation Rakshak in Jammu and Kashmir. It has also won 12 Chief of Army Staff Commendation Cards and 22 GOC-in-C Cards.

The Regiment was presented the ‘President’s Standards’ at Roorkee on 30 September 2011 by General V. K. Singh, Chief of the Army Staff, on behalf of the President of India, Mrs Pratibha Patil.

Major Sahil Gautam won the Bronze Medal in the Ranking Round at the 2nd National Para Archery Championship held at Hyderabad.

== Regimental Insignia ==
The regimental insignia consists of a Vijayanta tank in silhouette surrounded by laurel leaves with a mailed fist or gauntlet at the top. The motto of the regiment is सर्वदा विजयी (Sarvada Vijayee), which translates to ‘Always victorious’.
