= List of Indian divisions in World War II =

This is a list of British-Indian Army divisions in World War II.

== Divisions by type ==
=== Airborne ===
- 9th Airborne Division
- 44th Airborne Division

=== Armoured ===
- 31st Armoured Division
- 32nd Armoured Division
- 43rd Armoured Division
- 44th Armoured Division (reformed as 44th Airborne Division)

=== Infantry ===
- 4th Division
- 5th Division
- 6th Division
- 7th Division
- 8th Division
- 9th Division
- 10th Division
- 11th Division
- 14th Division
- 17th Division (Note: Post-war, the 17th Gurkha Division would be formed using this number.)
- 19th Division
- 20th Division
- 23rd Division
- 25th Division
- 26th Division
- 34th Division
- 36th Division (later converted to an all-British formation)
- 1st Burma Division (later designated as 39th Division)

=== Long-range Penetration ===
- 3rd Division (used as a cover name for the Chindits)

=== Training ===
- 14th Division
- 39th Division (formerly 1st Burma Division)

=== Deception / Lines of Communication ===
- 2nd Division
- 12th Division

=== Emergency ===
- 21st Division

== See also ==
- Indian Army during World War II
- List of Indian divisions in World War I
- List of British Empire divisions in the Second World War
- British Empire in World War II
