= List of Canadian divisions in World War II =

This is a list of Canadian divisions in World War II:

Insignia	Division	Formation Date	Disbandment Date	Battles
	1st Canadian Infantry Division	1 September 1939	15 September 1945	Italian campaign Western Front
	2nd Canadian Infantry Division	1 September 1939	December 1945	Western Front
	3rd Canadian Infantry Division	24 May 1940	23 November 1945	Western Front
	3rd Canadian Infantry Division (CAOF)	23 November 1945	20 June 1946	Occupation of Germany
	4th Canadian (Armoured) Division	24 May 1940	1946	Western Front
	5th Canadian (Armoured) Division	27 February 1941	12 December 1945	Italian campaign Western Front
	6th Canadian Infantry Division	18 March 1942	31 January 1946	Aleutian Islands campaign
	6th Canadian Infantry Division (CAPF)	20 November 1944	September 1945	None
	7th Canadian Infantry Division	12 May 1942	December 1943	American theater (Home defense)
	8th Canadian Infantry Division	18 March 1942	15 October 1943	American theater (Home defense)

== See also ==
- List of Canadian divisions in World War I
- List of British Empire divisions in the Second World War
