= List of Canadian divisions in World War I =

List of Canadian divisions in World War I:

- 1st Canadian Division embarked for France February 1915.
- 2nd Canadian Division embarked September 1915.
- 3rd Canadian Division formed in France, December 1915.
- 4th Canadian Division formed in Britain, April 1916, embarked for France August of that year.
- 5th Canadian Division began assembling in Britain in February, 1917, but was broken up in February 1918.

== See also ==
- List of Canadian divisions in World War II
