= 120th Division =

In military terms, 120th Division or 120th Infantry Division may refer to:

- 120th Division (People's Republic of China)
- 120th Division (Imperial Japanese Army)
- 120th Guards Naval Infantry Division, Russia/Soviet Union
- 120th Guards Rifle Division, Soviet Union, later the 120th Guards Motor Rifle Division
- 120th Rifle Division, Soviet Union

== See also ==
- List of military divisions by number
- 120th Brigade (disambiguation)
- 120th Regiment (disambiguation)
- 120th Squadron (disambiguation)
- 120th (disambiguation)
