= 85 =

85 may refer to:

- 85 (number), the natural number following 84 and preceding 86
- One of the years 85 BC, AD 85, 1985, 2085
- 85 Io, a main-belt asteroid

== See also ==
- 85th (disambiguation)
- List of highways numbered 85
