= 85th Division =

85th Division or 85th Infantry Division may refer to:

== Infantry divisions ==
- 85th Division (People's Republic of China), 1949–1952; later the 2nd Garrison Division of Nanjing Military Region
- 85th Landwehr Division, German Empire
- 85th Infantry Division (Wehrmacht), Germany
- 85th Guards Rifle Division, Soviet Union
- 85th Motor Rifle Division, Soviet Union
- 85th Infantry Division (United States)

== Aviation divisions ==
- 85th Air Division, United States

== See also ==
- List of military divisions by number
- 85th Brigade (disambiguation)
- 85th Regiment (disambiguation)
