= LXXIII Corps =

LXXIII Corps or 73rd Corps may refer to:

- LXXIII Army Corps, Wehrmacht, Germany
- 73rd Rifle Corps, Soviet Union
- 73rd (Newton-le-Willows) Lancashire Rifle Volunteer Corps, United Kingdom

== See also ==
- List of military corps by number
- 73rd Brigade (disambiguation)
- 73rd Division (disambiguation)
- 73rd Regiment (disambiguation)
- 73rd (disambiguation)
