= 73rd Division =

In military terms, 73rd Division or 73rd Infantry Division may refer to:

== Infantry divisions ==
- 73rd Division (2nd Formation) (People's Republic of China)
- 73rd Infantry Division (Wehrmacht), Germany
- 73rd Division (Imperial Japanese Army)
- 73rd Infantry Division (Russian Empire)
- 73rd Infantry Division (South Korea)
- 73rd Rifle Division, Soviet Union/Russia
- 73rd Guards Rifle Division, Soviet Union
- 73rd Division (United Kingdom)
- 73rd Infantry Division (United States), planned during WWII but never formed

== Artillery divisions ==
- 73rd Anti-Aircraft Artillery Division, Soviet Union

== Aviation divisions ==
- 73rd Air Division, United States

== See also ==
- List of military divisions by number
- 73rd Brigade (disambiguation)
- 73rd Regiment (disambiguation)
