= 73 =

73 may refer to:

- 73 (number), the natural number following 72 and preceding 74
- One of the years 73 BC, AD 73, 1973, 2073
- 73 (magazine), a United States-based amateur radio magazine
- 73 Best regards, a popular Morse code abbreviation
- No. 73, a British 1980s children's TV show
- Nickname for the Boeing 737 airplane
- 73 Bristol Temple Meads–Bradley Stoke North, a bus route in England
- 73 Klytia, a main-belt asteroid

== See also ==
- 73rd (disambiguation)
- List of highways numbered 73
