= J73 (disambiguation) =

The General Electric J73 is a type of jet engine.

J73 may also refer to:

- HMS Niger (J73), A British minesweeper
- Johnson solid J73, a geometric shape
- JOVIAL J73, a computer programming language
- LNER Class J73, a class of British steam locomotives
- TransMilenio J73, a Colombian bus rapid transit route

== See also ==
- Chengdu J-7 III "Fishcan", Chinese jet fighter plane series variant of the MiG-21
- 73 (disambiguation)
- J (disambiguation)
