= 73rd Brigade =

73rd Brigade may refer to:

== India ==
- 73rd Indian Infantry Brigade

== South Africa ==
- 73 Motorised Brigade (South Africa)

== United Kingdom ==
- 73rd Brigade (United Kingdom)
- 73rd (Howitzer) Brigade, Royal Field Artillery, British Army unit during World War I
- 73rd (Northumbrian) Brigade, Royal Field Artillery, British Army unit after World War I
- 73rd Anti-Aircraft Brigade, Royal Artillery

== United States ==
- 73rd Infantry Brigade (United States)

== See also ==
- 73rd Division (disambiguation)
- 73rd Regiment (disambiguation)
