= 73rd Regiment of Foot =

Four regiments of the British Army have been numbered the 73rd Regiment of Foot:

- 73rd Regiment of Foot (1745), raised in 1745 and disbanded in 1746
- 73rd Regiment of Foot (1758), raised by re-designation of 2nd Battalion, 34th Regiment of Foot in 1758 and disbanded in 1763
- 73rd Regiment of Foot (Invalids), raised as the 116th Regiment of Foot in 1758, re-numbered as the 73rd Regiment of Foot (Invalids) in 1763 and disbanded in 1769
- 73rd (Highland) Regiment of Foot, raised in 1777 and renumbered as the 71st Regiment of Foot in 1786
- 73rd (Perthshire) Regiment of Foot, raised as the 2nd Battalion, 42nd Regiment of Foot in 1780, re-numbered as the 73rd (Highland) Regiment of Foot in 1787 and amalgamated in 1881
