= Bristol Temple Meads railway station =

Major railway station for the city of Bristol, England

Bristol Temple Meads
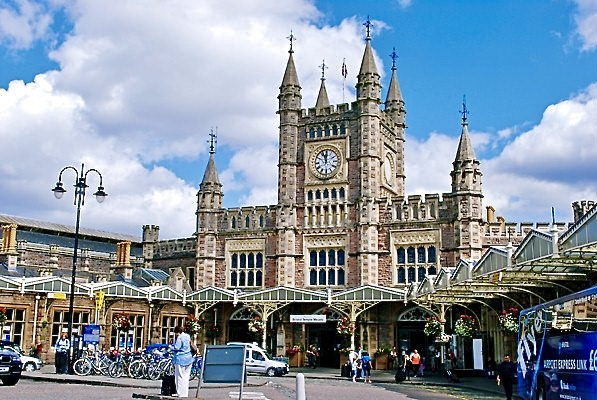
- Facade of the station

General information
- Location: Redcliffe, Bristol; England
- Coordinates: 51.449°N 2.580°W
- Grid reference: ST597725
- Manager: Network Rail
- Platforms: 13 in use

Other information
- Station code: BRI
- Classification: DfT category A

History
- Original company: Great Western Railway

Key dates
- 1840: Opened
- 1871–1878: Extended
- 1930s: Extended
- 1965: Original platforms closed

Passengers
- 2020/21: ▼2.033 million
- Interchange: ▼0.277 million
- 2021/22: ▲6.628 million
- Interchange: ▲0.971 million
- 2022/23: ▲9.292 million
- Interchange: ▲1.242 million
- 2023/24: ▲10.227 million
- Interchange: ▲1.498 million
- 2024/25: ▲10.877 million
- Interchange: ▲1.644 million
- 2025/26: ▲11.297 million
- Interchange: ▲1.820 million

Listed Building – Grade I
- Feature: Temple Meads Station
- Designated: 1 November 1966
- Reference no.: 1282106
Location
Notes
- Passenger statistics from the Office of Rail and Road

Bristol Temple Meads is the oldest and largest railway station in Bristol, England. It is located 118 miles 31 chains (118.39 mi; 190.5 km) away from London Paddington. It is an important transport hub for public transport in the city; there are bus services to many parts of the city and surrounding districts, with a ferry to the city centre. It is the busiest station in South West England, and the fifth busiest in Southern England outside of London. Bristol's other major station, Bristol Parkway, is a more recent station on the northern outskirts of the conurbation.

Temple Meads was opened on 31 August 1840, as the western terminus of the Great Western Railway. The railway, including Temple Meads, was the first to be designed by the British engineer Isambard Kingdom Brunel. Soon, the station was also used by the Bristol and Exeter Railway, the Bristol and Gloucester Railway, the Bristol Harbour Railway and the Bristol and South Wales Union Railway. To accommodate the increasing number of trains, the station was expanded in the 1870s by Francis Fox and again between 1930 and 1935 by Percy Emerson Culverhouse. Brunel's terminus is no longer part of the operational station. The historical significance of the station has been noted and most of the site is Grade I listed.

Temple Meads, which has 13 active platforms across eight tracks, is managed by Network Rail. Most services are operated by the present-day Great Western Railway, with others by CrossCountry.

== History ==
The name Temple Meads derives from the nearby Temple Church, which was gutted by bombing during the Second World War. The word "meads" is a derivation of "mæd", an Old English variation of "mædwe", meadow, referring to the water meadows alongside the River Avon that were part of Temple parish. As late as 1820 the site was undeveloped pasture outside the boundaries of the old city, some distance from the commercial centre. It lay between the Floating Harbour and the city's cattle market, which was built in 1830.

=== Brunel's station ===
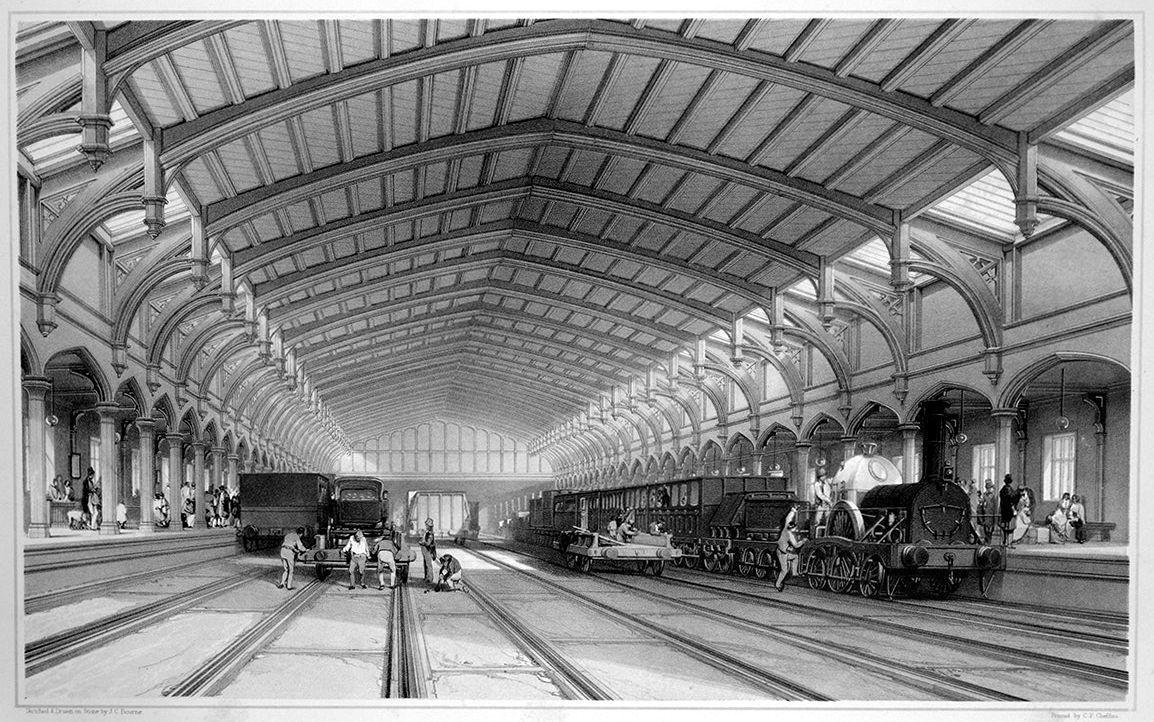
Engraving of interior of Brunel's train-shed from c1843, by John Cooke Bourne

The original terminus was built in 1839–41 for the Great Western Railway (GWR), the first passenger railway in Bristol, and was designed by Isambard Kingdom Brunel, the railway's engineer. It was built to accommodate Brunel's 7 ft 1/4 in (2,140 mm) broad gauge. The station was on a viaduct to raise it above the level of the Floating Harbour and River Avon, the latter being crossed via the Grade I listed Avon Bridge. The station was covered by a 200-foot (60 m) train shed, extended beyond the platforms by 155 feet (47 m) into a storage area and engine shed, fronted by an office building in the Tudor style. Train services to Bath commenced on 31 August 1840 and were extended to Paddington on 30 June 1841 following the completion of Box Tunnel.

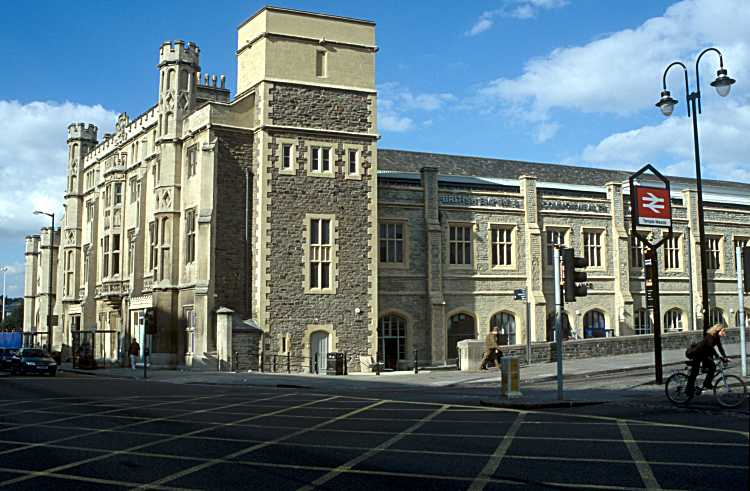
Brunel's original station as it appeared in 2004

A few weeks before the start of the services to Paddington the Bristol and Exeter Railway (B&ER) had opened, on 14 June 1841, its trains reversing in and out of the GWR station. The third railway at Temple Meads was the Bristol and Gloucester Railway, which opened on 8 July 1844 and was taken over by the Midland Railway (MR) on 1 July 1845. This used the GWR platforms, diverging onto its own line on the far side of the bridge over the Floating Harbour. Both these new railways were engineered by Brunel and were initially broad gauge. Brunel also designed the Bristol and South Wales Union Railway, but this was not opened until 25 August 1863, nearly four years after his death. It terminated at Temple Meads.

=== Bristol and Exeter Railway station ===
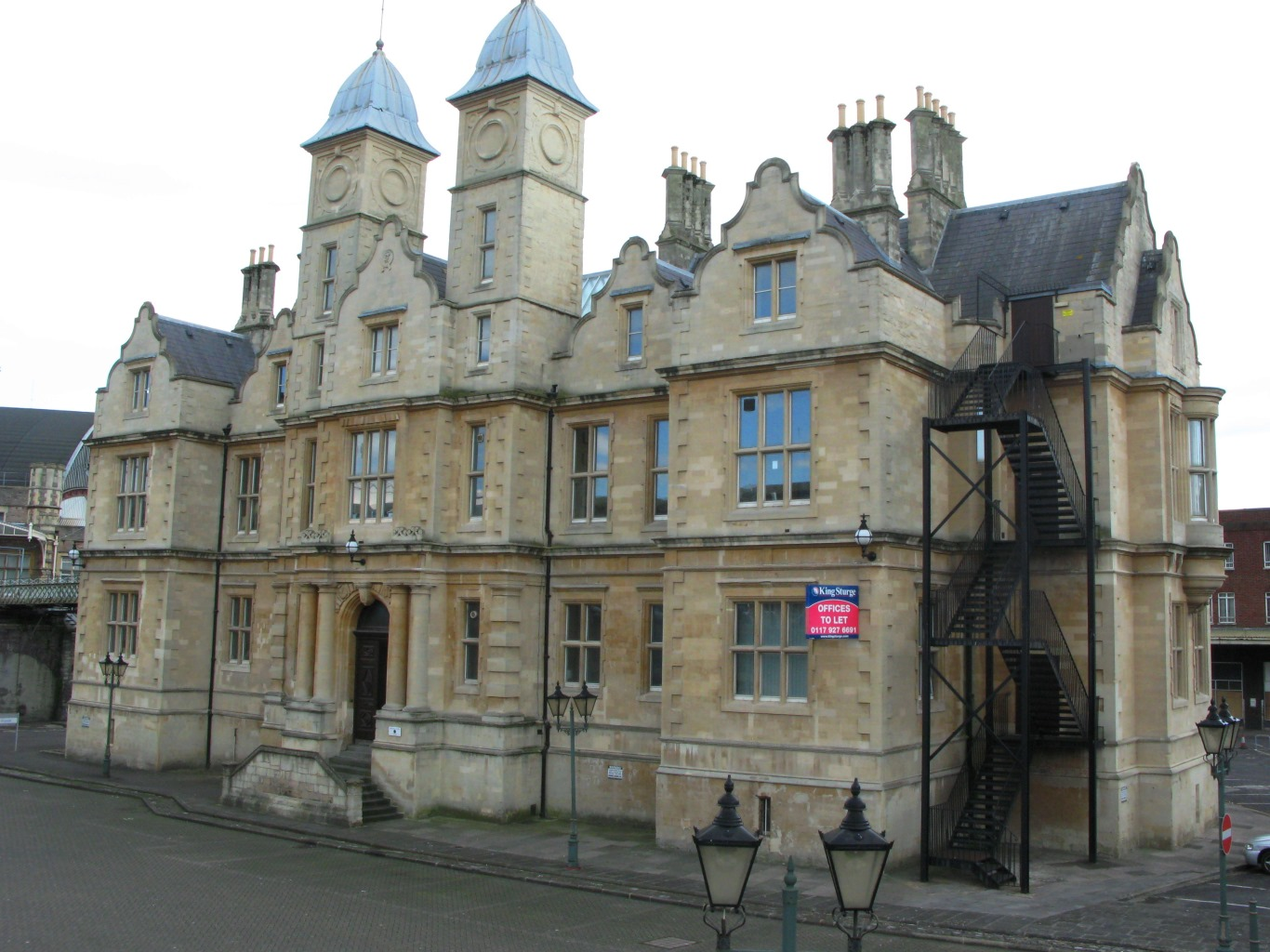
The Bristol and Exeter Railway headquarters

In 1845 the B&ER built its own station at right angles to the GWR station and an "express platform" on the curve linking the two lines so that through trains no longer had to reverse. The wooden B&ER station was known locally as "The Cowshed"; but a grand headquarters was built at street level on the west side of its station in 1852–54 to the Jacobean designs of Samuel Fripp. The Bristol and Portishead Pier and Railway opened a branch off the Bristol and Exeter line west of the city on 18 April 1867, the trains being operated by the B&ER and using its platforms at Temple Meads.

In 1850 an engine shed was opened on the south bank of the River Avon on the east side of the line to the B&ER station. Between 1859 and 1875, 23 engines were built in the workshops attached to the shed, including several distinctive Bristol and Exeter Railway 4-2-4T locomotives.

=== Goods stations ===
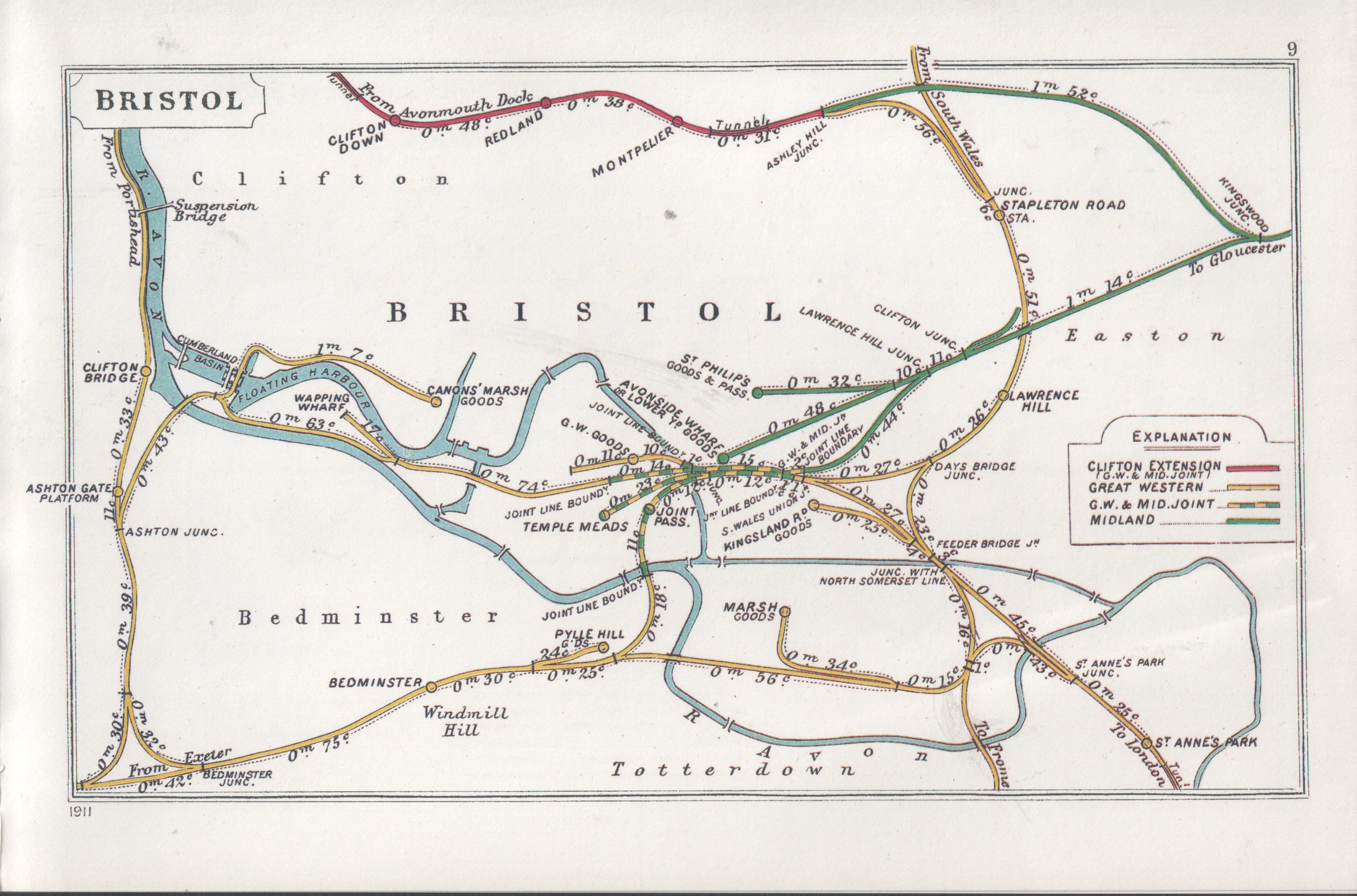
A 1911 Railway Clearing House junction diagram showing railways around Bristol

The GWR built a 326-by-138-foot (99 m × 42 m) goods shed on the north side of the station adjacent to the Floating Harbour, with a small dock for transhipment of goods to barges (not seagoing ships, as the wharf was upstream of Bristol Bridge). Wagons had to be lowered 12 feet (4 m) to the goods shed on hoists. On 11 March 1872, a direct connection to the harbour was made in the form of the Bristol Harbour Railway, a joint operation of the three railways, which ran between the passenger station and the goods yard, across the street outside on a bridge, and descended into a tunnel under the churchyard of St. Mary Redcliffe on its way to a wharf downstream of Bristol Bridge. The southern end of the tunnel can still be seen between the bottom of Guinea Street and the Ostrich public house. The footbridge across the entrance to Bathhurst Basin is on the site of the railway bascule bridge.

The B&ER had a goods depot at Pylle Hill (south of the station) from 1850, and the MR had an independent yard at Avonside Wharf on the opposite side of the Floating Harbour from 1858.

=== Effects of the change of gauge ===
On 29 May 1854 the Midland Railway laid a third rail along their line to Gloucester to provide mixed gauge so that it could operate 4 ft 8 1/2 in (1,435 mm) standard gauge passenger trains while broad gauge goods trains could still run to collieries north of Bristol. Sidings at South Wales Junction allowed traffic to be transhipped between wagons on the two different gauges. The GWR continued to operate its trains on the broad gauge, but on 3 September 1873 it opened the standard gauge Bristol and North Somerset Railway. This had a junction nearly 1/2 mile (800 m) from the station on the London line and so mixed gauge was extended to that point. During the following year mixed gauge track was continued beyond Bath in connection with the conversion of the Wilts, Somerset and Weymouth Railway to standard gauge. Mixed gauge was laid through Box Tunnel on 16 May 1875 and so standard gauge trains could run to London, although broad gauge was retained west of Temple Meads and through trains from London to Penzance and other stations in Devon and Cornwall continued to be broad gauge. Goods traffic was transhipped between the two gauges in the B&ER yard at Pylle Hill.

The B&ER converted the line to Taunton to mixed gauge by 1 June 1875, but the remainder of the line to Exeter was not done until 1 March 1876, three months after the B&ER had amalgamated with the GWR. The remainder of the lines beyond Exeter were converted to standard gauge on 21 May 1892 so the extra rails at Temple Meads fell into disuse and were removed to leave a purely standard gauge layout. This allowed the through station to be rebuilt with two additional platform faces.

=== 1870s expansion ===
Bristol Joint Station Act 1865
- Act of Parliament
- Parliament of the United Kingdom
- Long title: An Act for a Joint Station at Bristol for the Great Western, Bristol and Exeter, and Midland Railway Companies; and for other Purposes.
- Citation: 28 & 29 Vict. c. xcviii

Dates
- Royal assent: 19 June 1865

Text of statute as originally enacted

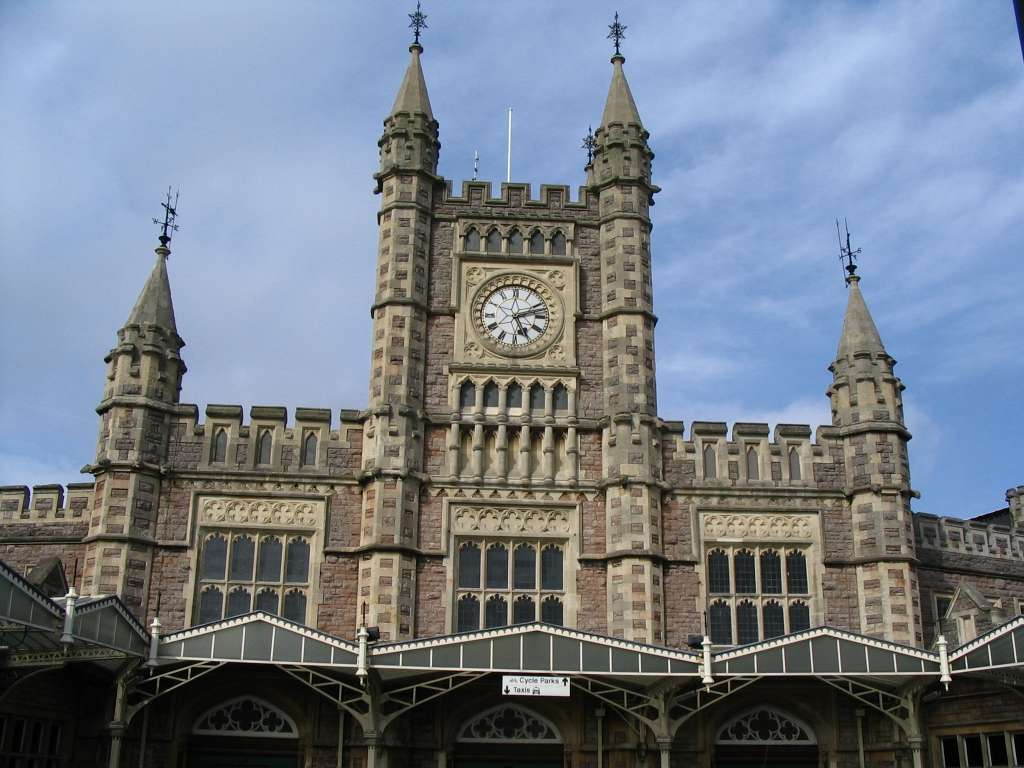
The main entrance to the station built in the 1870s between the terminal and through platforms. The tower was topped by a spire until World War II.

The additional railway routes put the two short 140-yard (130 m) platforms of Brunel's terminus under pressure and a scheme was developed to extend the station. An enabling act of Parliament for a new Bristol Joint Station, the Bristol Joint Station Act 1865 (28 & 29 Vict. c. xcviii) was passed, and between 1871 and 1878 the station was extensively rebuilt by a committee formed of the three principal railway companies that used the station. Brunel's platforms were extended by 212 yards (194 m) towards London, and a new three-platform through station was built on the site of the express platform, while the B&ER station was closed and the site used for a new carriage shed. From the 1960s, the work was usually attributed to Brunel's former associate Matthew Digby Wyatt, but in 2020 it was established to be by Bristol architect Henry Lloyd under the superintendence of Francis Fox, the engineer of the B&ER. The curved wrought-iron train shed over the new through platforms was 500 feet (150 m) long on the platform wall. The goods depot was rebuilt, with the inconvenient wagon hoists replaced by a steep incline from the east end of Temple Meads, which meant that the sidings in the goods shed were at right angles to their original alignment; and the barge dock was filled in.

Trains on the Bristol and South Wales Union and the Midland routes operated from the terminal platforms, while the GWR used the new through platforms. The capital costs of the new work were split 4/14th GWR/B&ER and 10/14th MR, and operating costs were split GWR 3/8th, MR 3/8th and B&ER 2/8th. Hence, when the GWR absorbed the B&ER in 1876 the split became GWR 5/8th and MR (later LMS) 3/8th, until nationalisation on 1 January 1948.

=== Twentieth-century changes ===
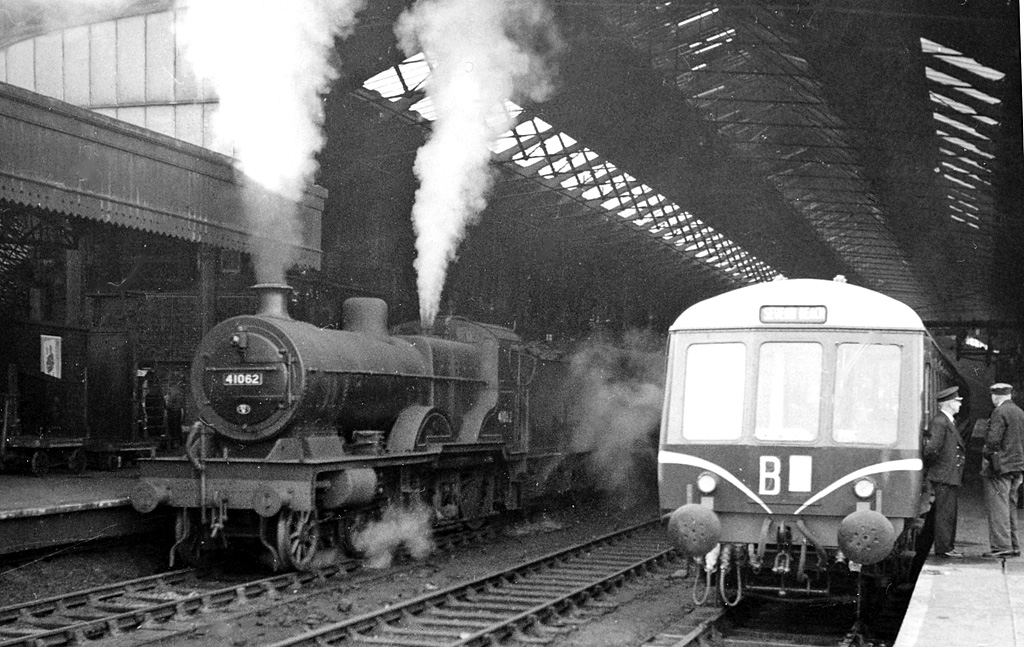
Original terminus in 1958

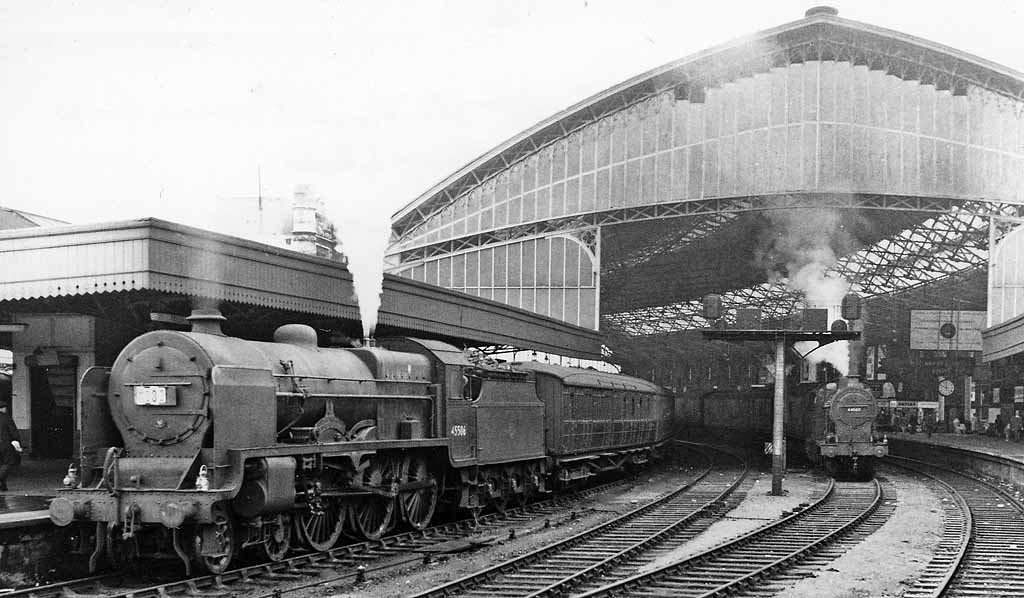
A Paignton to Leeds express stands at Platform 7 (now Platform 5) in 1960.

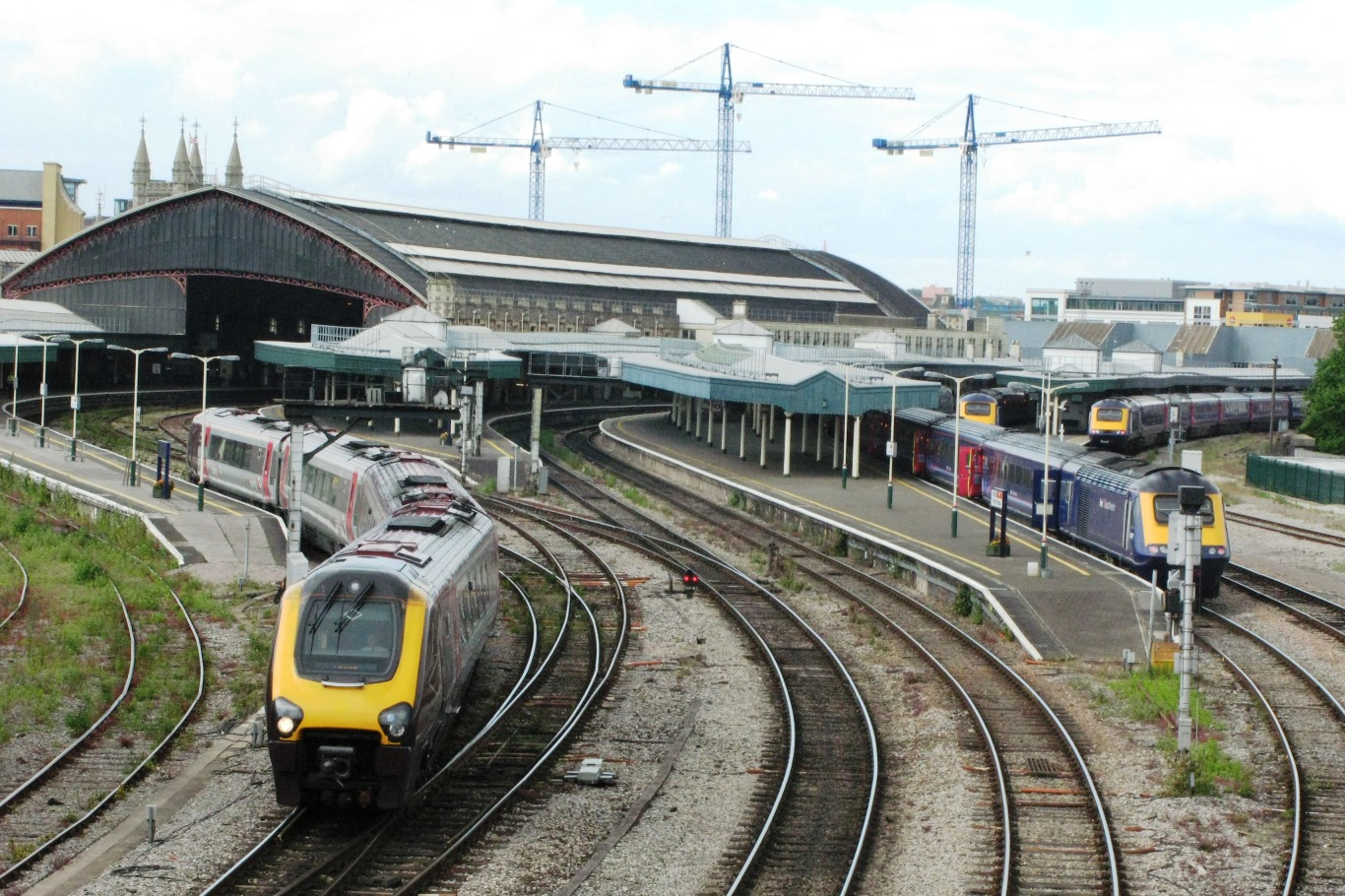
A view looking northwards from Bath Road. The 1870s arched train shed is surrounded by the flatter canopies of the newer platforms opened in 1935.

In 1924 the goods depot was rebuilt with 15 platforms, each 575 feet (175 m) long. Large warehousing and cellar space was provided to store goods, although by this time another city centre goods depot had been opened at Canons Marsh.

Between 1930 and 1935 the through station was expanded under the direction of the GWR's chief architect P. E. Culverhouse, in Art Deco style, both eastwards over the old cattle market and southwards on a new wider bridge across Cattle Market Road and the New Cut of the River Avon. This made room for the addition of five through-platform faces, while the removal of the narrow island platforms in the middle of the train shed allowed the main Up and Down platforms to be both widened and lengthened. All the routes approaching Temple Meads were widened to four tracks to allow more flexibility.

As part of this work, four manual signal boxes were replaced by three power signal boxes, and the semaphore signals and mechanical point linkages were replaced by colour light signals and point motors. The new Bristol Temple Meads East box was the largest on the GWR, with 368 miniature levers operated by three signalmen assisted by a "booking boy". The other two boxes were at Bristol Temple Meads West, and controlling the movements in and out of the new Bath Road Depot, which replaced the old B&ER locomotive works in 1934.

During World War II the station was bombed, which led to the destruction of the wooden spire of the clock tower above the ticket office on 3 January 1941. Gas lighting was replaced by fluorescent electric lights in 1960.

Bristol Panel Signal Box was built on the site of Platform 14. When opened, it controlled 280 multiple-aspect signals and 243 motor-worked points on 114 miles (183 km) of route, the largest area controlled by a single signal box on British Rail at the time.

The construction of this signal box, completed in 1970, involved the demolition of almost half of the 1870s extension to Brunel's terminus and completely blocked rail access to the Old Station.

A second main-line station serving the city, Bristol Parkway, opened in 1972. It is on the northern outskirts of the conurbation close to the M32 motorway and was designed as a park and ride facility for long-distance travellers.

In the late 1960s the Royal Mail built a mail conveyor at the northern end of the station, with significant aesthetic impact. This was out of use for many years following the transfer of Royal Mail's activities to the West of England Mail Centre at Filton and the opening of the short-lived Railnet Hub next to Bristol Parkway station in May 2000. It was finally dismantled in stages and removed between October and December 2014. In 1990/91, £2 million was spent by InterCity on a renovation of the main train shed and another £7 million on restoring some of the older areas of the station, including the refurbishment of the subway and construction of new retail outlets. The shorter of the two 1935 platform islands had been used only for parcels traffic since the 1960s but was temporarily brought back into passenger use during this work. It was fully restored for passenger use in 2001.

In August 1998, a 15-month, £7 million project commenced with work performed on the external facade, clocktower, roof and paving. As part of this work, the quarry from which the dolomite stone had originally been extracted was reopened in Abbots Leigh.

Preceding station	Historical railways	Following station
St Anne's Park	Great Western Railway; To London via Box	Bedminster
Lawrence Hill	Great Western Railway; To London via Badminton, To Cardiff and Pilning via Avonmouth	Bedminster
Brislington	Great Western Railway; To Radstock	Terminus
Fishponds	Bristol and Gloucester Railway (later Midland Railway)	Terminus

=== Closure of lines ===
Passenger traffic on the old North Somerset line ceased on 2 November 1959, and many more closures followed after the publication of Dr Beeching's The Reshaping of British Railways in 1963. The connection to the Bristol Harbour Railway was closed on 6 January 1964; passenger trains to Portishead were withdrawn on 7 September 1964; and most local services in the north of the city were withdrawn on 23 November 1964. The following year saw local services on the Midland route to Gloucester withdrawn and the Midland route to Bath Green Park via Mangotsfield was closed on 7 March 1966. St Anne's Park and Saltford on the line towards Bath survived until 5 January 1970.

On 12 September 1965, the terminal platforms were closed. This allowed the platforms to be renumbered with the order reversed (see list below). The redundant train shed became a covered car park in February of the following year, but from 1989 until 1999 the original (Brunel) part was an interactive science centre known as The Exploratory and an exhibition space. From 2002 to 2008, it housed the British Empire and Commonwealth Museum. As of 2016, the shed, now known as the Passenger Shed, is a venue for events such as conferences and weddings.

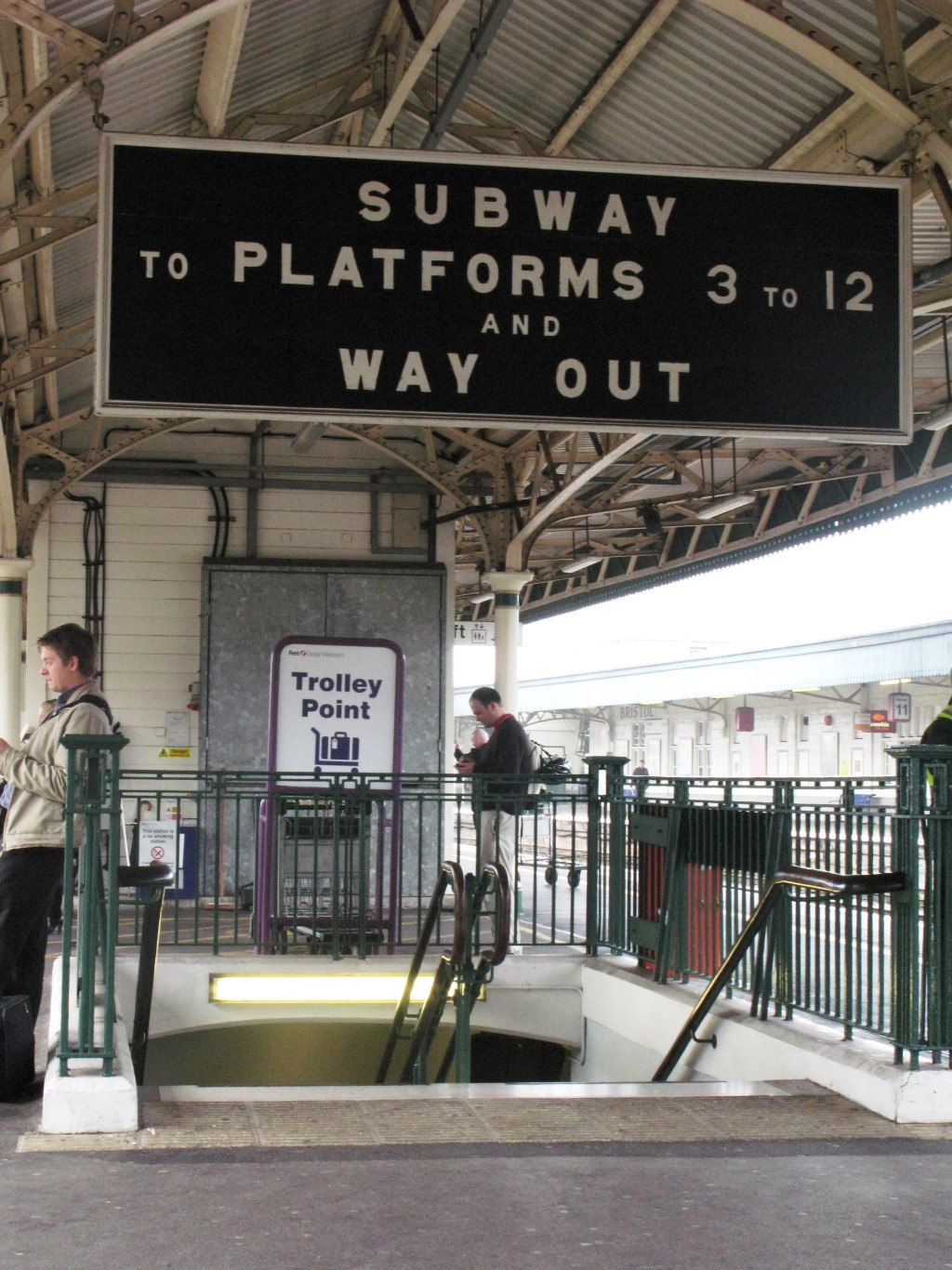
This sign should read "Platforms 1 to 12" but refers to the earlier numbering system when these platforms were numbers 1 and 2. They are now 15 (left) and 13 (right).

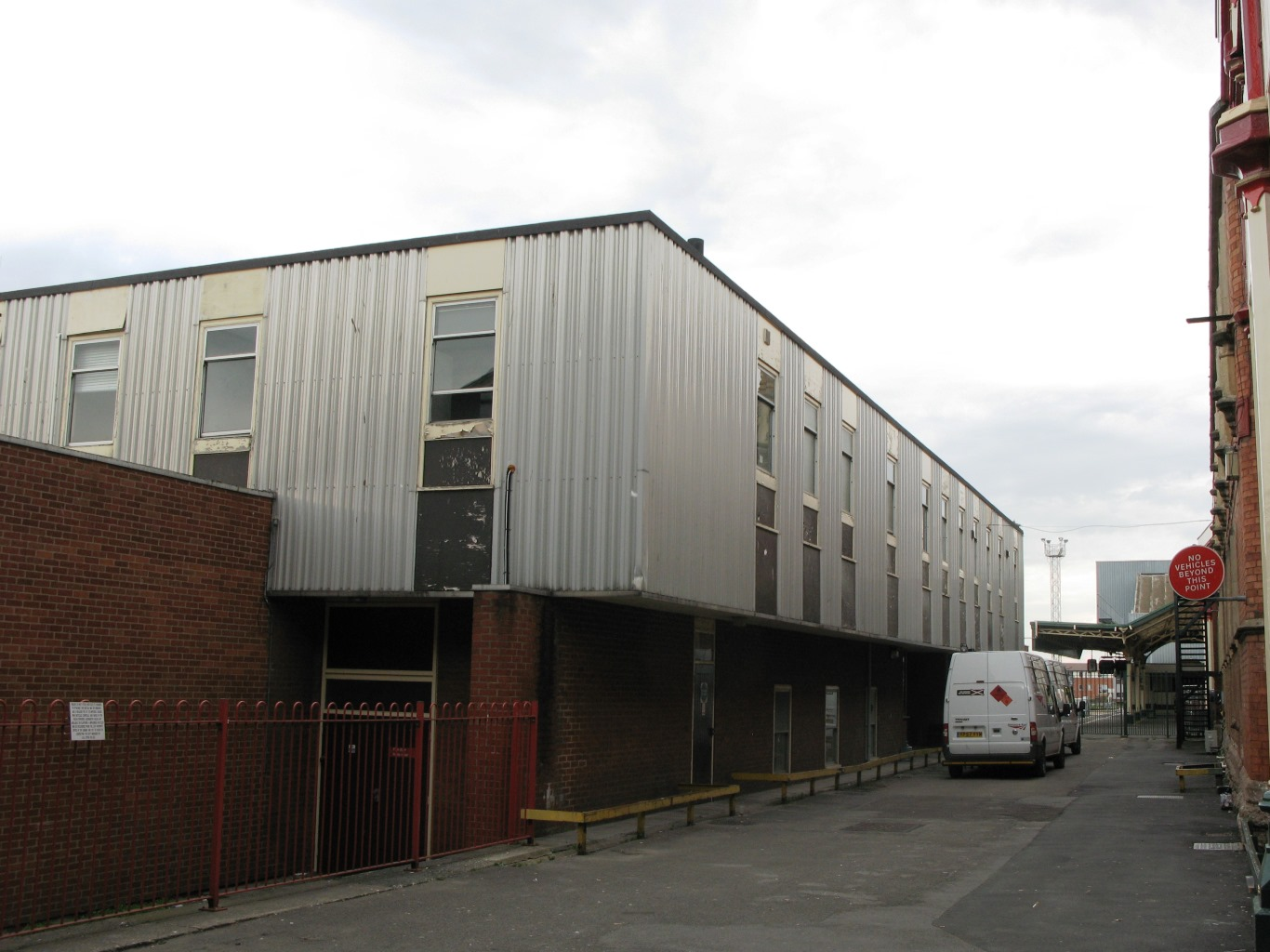
Bristol Panel Signal Box, built on the old Platform 14

Old	New	Location
1	15	
2	13	
3	12	West end
4	11	East end
5	9 & 10	East and west ends numbered differently
6	7 & 8	East and west ends numbered differently
7	5	East end in the main train shed
8	6	West end beyond (new ) platform 5
9	3	East end in the main train shed
10	4	West end beyond (new) platform 3
11	2	West end bay (not in use)
12	1	East end of arrival platform
13	Closed	West end of arrival platform
14	Closed	East end of departure platform
15	Closed	West end of departure platform

=== Enterprise zone and station redevelopment ===
Bristol Temple Quarter Enterprise Zone, an enterprise zone with an area of 70 hectares (170 acres) centred on Temple Meads, was announced in 2011, and launched in 2012. Network Rail is a partner in coordinating development in the zone. In November 2012, Network Rail announced a £100 million redevelopment of the station, with two unused platforms to be opened up. Station Approach Road will be turned into a public square and the station's main entrance moved to the north side. A large bridge above the tracks at the east end of the station which was erected in the 1970s for postal traffic was demolished at Christmas 2014. In November 2016, the University of Bristol announced that it plans to build a Temple Quarter Campus to the east of the station, replacing the derelict sorting office which was formerly connected to the station by the bridge.

Bristol and Exeter House has been redeveloped by TCN UK as a business hub for small and medium-sized enterprises. Part of Brunel's station has found a new use in a redevelopment by the City Council, the University of Bristol and the West of England Local Enterprise Partnership. Opened in 2013 as the Engine Shed, it hosts business incubators for startups.

Plans to build a 12,000-capacity arena on the former site of the Bristol Bath Road Traction Maintenance Depot, to the south of the station, were cancelled in 2018.

=== 21st century ===
The new eastern entrance to the station opened in September 2026

The Great Western Main Line from London to Bristol was part of electrification plans first announced by the UK government in 2009. However, because of cost overruns and delays, on 8 November 2016 the government announced that several elements of the programme would be deferred including electrification south-west of Thingley Junction near Chippenham, and between Temple Meads and Bristol Parkway. Although this left Temple Meads un-electrified, the Hitachi Super Express trains are bi-mode so can operate on diesel around Bristol and can use electricity where the electrification work is complete. The electrification plans do not extend west of Bristol, so local services will continue to be provided using diesel trains, with Class 165/166s cascaded from Thames Valley services scheduled to replace the 150/153/158s on local services.

The Portishead branch line, which runs along the south side of the River Avon from a junction just beyond Parson Street station is proposed to be reopened. There is an aspiration of two trains per hour between Portishead and Temple Meads in peak periods, possibly calling at Bedminster and Parson Street. The line was built in the 1860s but closed to passenger traffic in 1964, leaving Portishead as one of Britain's largest towns without a railway station. The line was reopened for freight traffic to serve Royal Portbury Docks in 2001, and the restoration of passenger traffic is considered part of the Greater Bristol Metro scheme, which was given the go-ahead in July 2012 as part of a City Deal, whereby local councils would be given greater control over money by the government.

The Metro scheme could also see the reopening of the Henbury Loop Line to passengers, with the possibility of services from Temple Meads to Bristol Parkway via Clifton Down and Henbury. Plans for a loop were rejected by the West of England Joint Transport Board, but in July 2015 Bristol City Councillors voted to send the decision back to the board for further discussion.

It was announced in 2013 that the station roof would be refurbished as part of a scheme to transform the station over the 25 years commencing 2013. In September 2021, foundations were installed for a planned eastern entrance to the station. Following the erection of scaffolding inside the station, work on the roof began in April 2022. On 1 April 2014, Network Rail took over management of the station from First Great Western.

South Western Railway services to London Waterloo were withdrawn from December 2021, followed by GWR services to Brighton in 2022. In 2024, direct services to Oxford were reintroduced by GWR on a trial basis on Saturdays only. In March 2025, the regional transport body covering Oxford, England's Economic Heartland, proposed an hourly, all-week Bristol to Oxford service to start from 2026. In May 2026, GWR commenced daily direct services to Oxford every two hours Monday to Saturday.

A new station reception was opened in 2023, replacing the information desk on platform three.

The station also hosts the Station Innovation Zone in partnership with Catapult. It has been used as a test station for a number of accessibility improvements through the program, including one where Auracast is used to relay station announcements to compatible headphones and hearing aids.

== Description ==
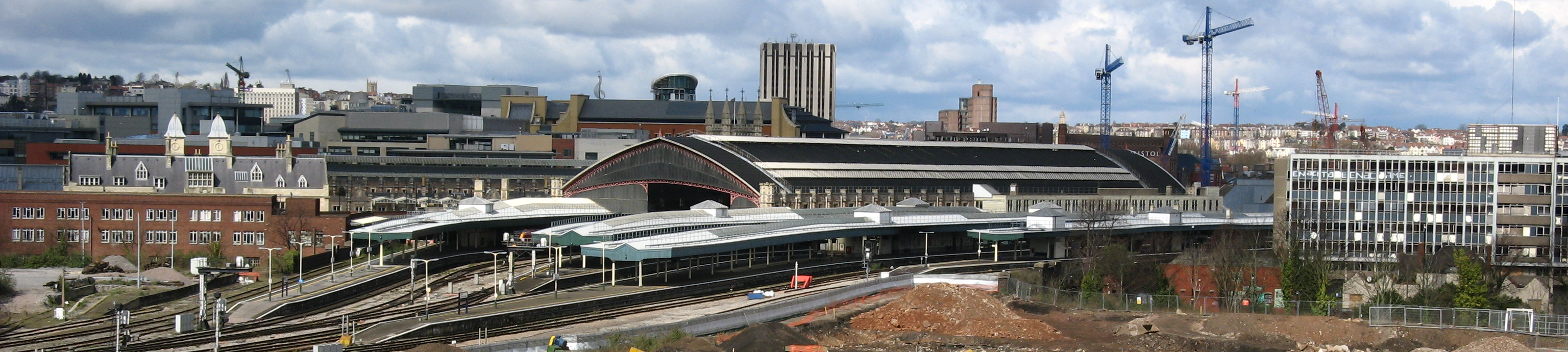
The station from the south. The main approach is from the left, behind the brown brick offices (Collett House). The turrets behind these belong to Bristol & Exeter House, which hides Brunel's building. Fox's extension can be seen to the right of Bristol & Exeter House, linking Brunel's station with the large arch of the main train shed. The flatter canopies belong to Culverhouse's 1935 extensions, with platform 4 on the extreme left and Platform 15 partly hidden by the trees on the right. The lower modern buildings behind the station are the Temple Quay office complex, on the site of the old goods shed. The demolition rubble in the foreground is the remains of Bristol Bath Road TMD.

=== Approaches ===
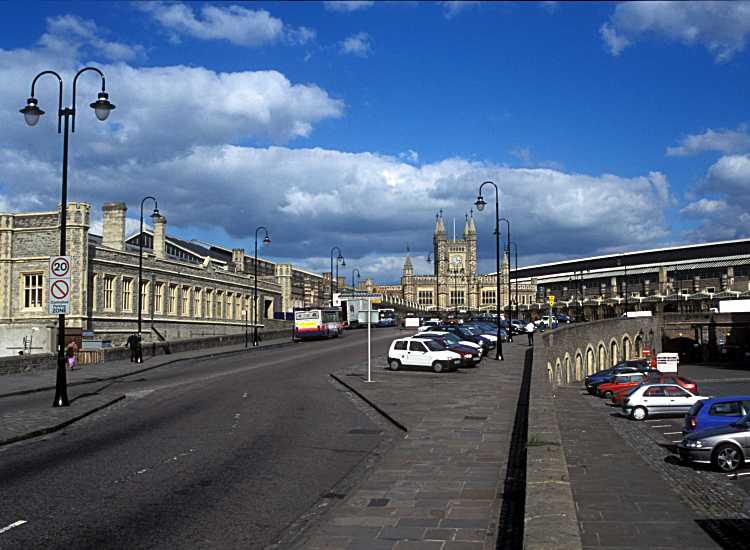
The station approach looks straight towards Fox's turreted 1870s station entrance. Part of Brunel's original station on the left with Fox's 1870s extension between that and the entrance; the current station train shed is to the right of the entrance.

Although it is now possible to reach the station through the Temple Quay office development (on the site of the goods shed) or from the Bristol Ferry Boat Company landing stage on the Floating Harbour, the traditional and main approach is from Temple Gate. Isambard Kingdom Brunel's Tudor-style offices, later used by the former British Empire and Commonwealth Museum, face this road and are flanked on the north side by an archway that used to be the main station for departing passengers; a matching arch on the other side was the arrivals gateway but was removed when the station was expanded in the 1870s.

Opposite these offices are the Grosvenor Hotel and the derelict George Railway Hotel, which were built in the 1870s, on either side of the site of the Bristol Harbour Railway bridge. A modern pub named The Reckless Engineer as a tribute to Brunel faces the approach road to the station.

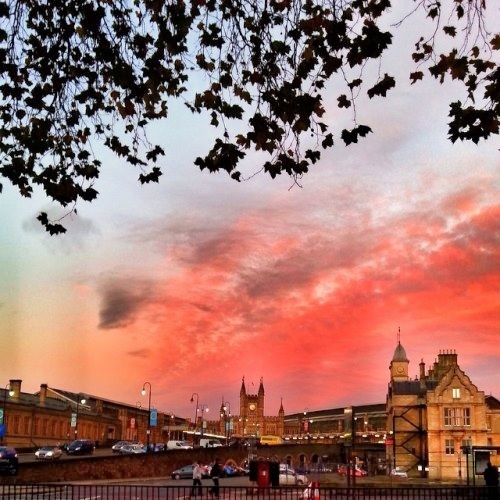
Autumn sunset over Bristol Temple Meads station

On the right of the Station Approach but at a lower level is the B&ER office building designed by Samuel Fripp; the 1930s offices known as "Collett House" (named after Charles Collett) and a disused parcels depot lie beyond. On the left is Brunel's original station building. The train shed is 72 feet (22 m) wide with a wooden box-frame roof and cast iron columns disguised as hammerbeams above Tudor arches. It is believed to be the widest hammerbeam roof in England and, along with most of the station, is a Grade I listed building, and forms part of a proposed Great Western Railway World Heritage Site. At the top of the slope an entrance on the left to the covered car park marks the junction between the original terminus and Fox's 1870s extension.

Ahead is the turreted main station building, and to the right a flat area marks the site of the B&ER station. The tunnel beneath this area was the route for passengers to and from the Down platform from 1878 until the station was enlarged in 1935.

Outside the old station building is a statue of Brunel, moved here in 2021 but first erected in the city centre in 1982.

=== Station ===
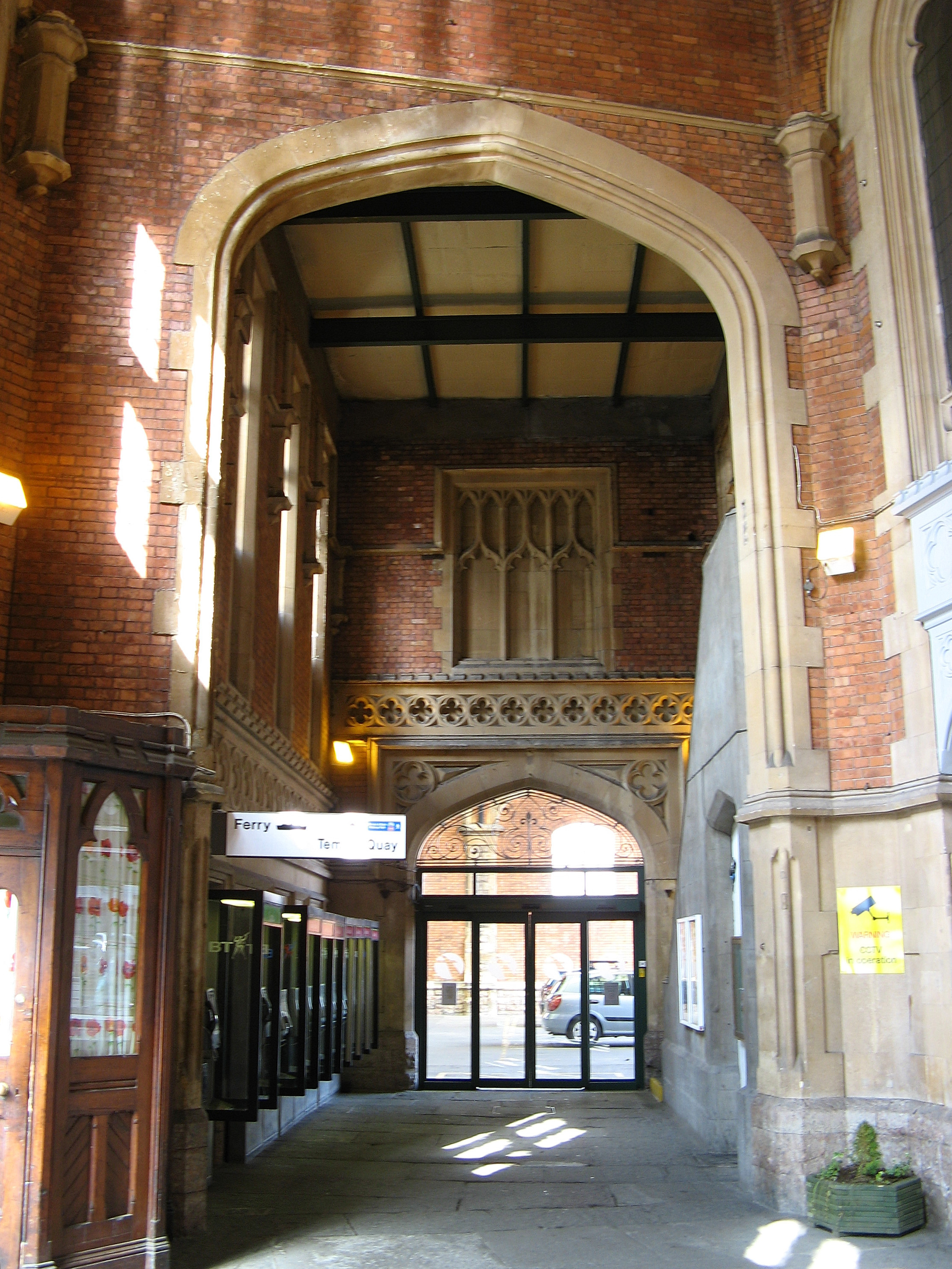
Entrance foyer, Brunel's station to left and current platforms to right

Entering the main building, the ticket office and ticket machines are immediately ahead, and the route from Temple Quay and the ferry is on the left; a newsagent is on the right, next to the platform entrance. Customer Information System screens by the entrance show arrival and departure information for all platforms, as do displays on each of the platforms.

It is located 118 miles 31 chains (118.39 mi; 190.5 km) from London Paddington. There are 13 numbered platforms serving 8 tracks. The platforms are numbered from 1–15 with 2 and 14 omitted. Platforms 1, 13 and 15 do not share tracks with any other platform. Platforms 3–12 consist of five tracks that are each subdivided into a pair of numbered platforms. Of those, the odd numbered platforms are at the north end of the station, while even numbers are at the south end. All platforms are signalled for trains in either direction and the flexible layout means that trains on any route can use any part of the station.

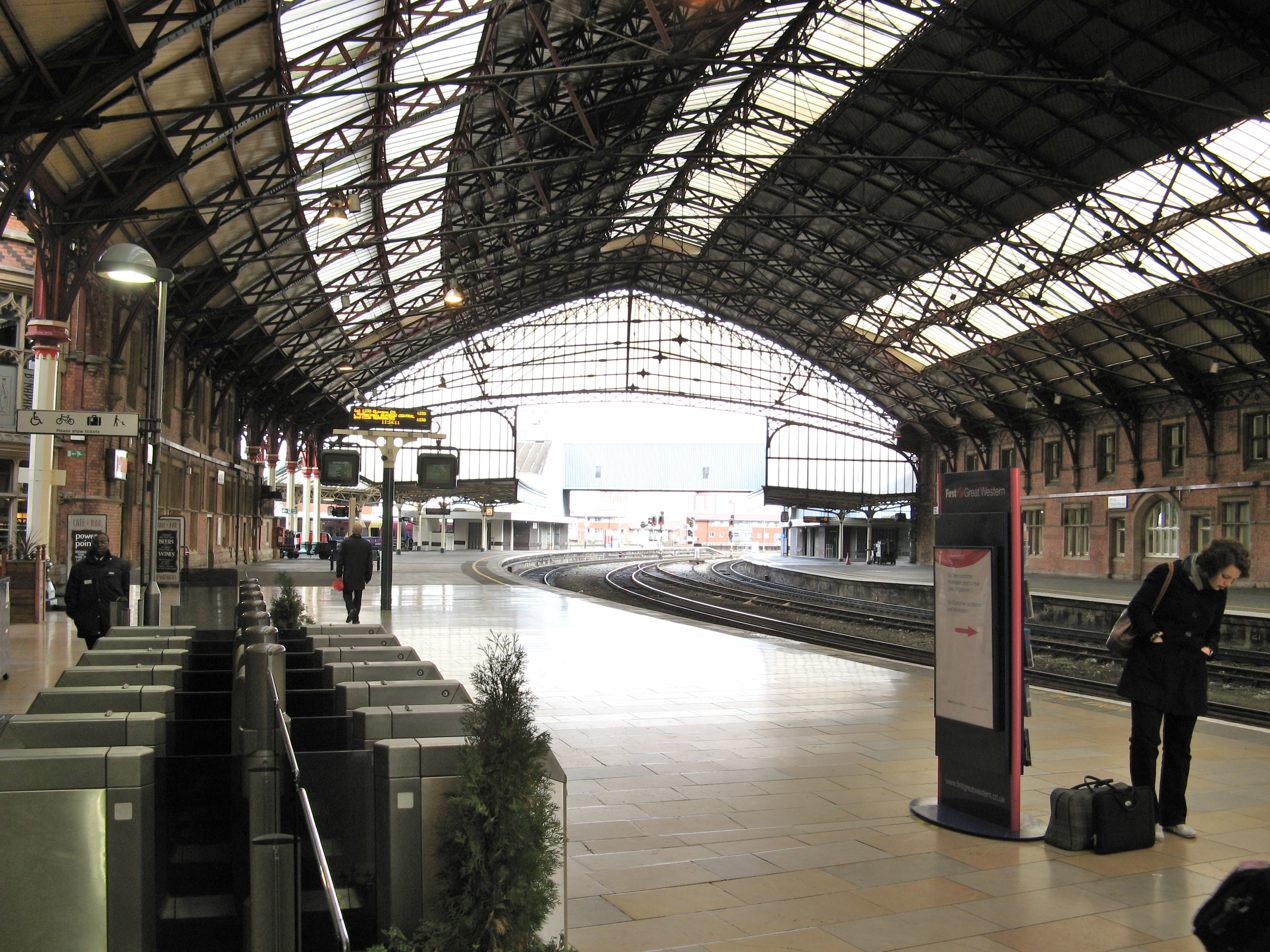
Platform 3 and the ticket gates that control entrance to the platforms

Entrance to the platforms is controlled by automatic ticket gates on Platform 3, which is used by many northbound CrossCountry trains and local services to Bristol Parkway and Gloucester. The main station restaurant and bar is on the left and the short Platform 1, a bay, is beyond this. This is most frequently used by Severn Beach Line trains but is long enough to handle any four-car Diesel Multiple Unit (DMU). Behind Platform 1 is a brick wall that forms part of the signal box and on this are some metal artworks created by artists with learning difficulties to celebrate Brunel's 200th anniversary in 2006; an interpretation panel is nearby. The High Level Siding beyond Platform 1 is the rump of the Bristol Harbour Railway, and Bristol Barton Hill TMD can be seen in the distance alongside Bristol East Junction (formerly South Wales Junction) where the lines to Bristol Parkway and Bath diverge.

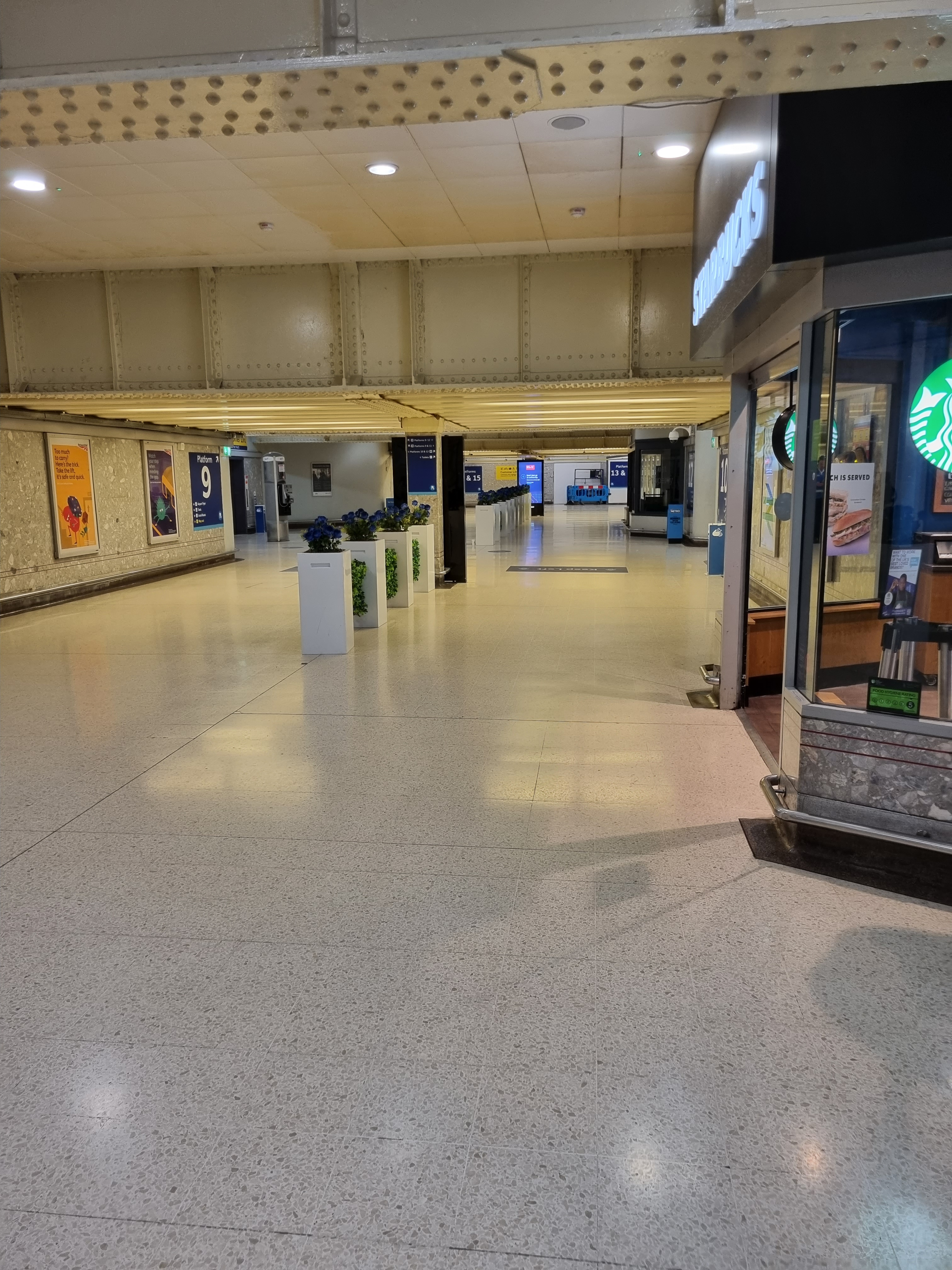
The subway, below the station, links the platforms

On the right of the entrance is the subway that links all the platforms, reached either by steps or lift; it houses the main public toilets, automated teller machines (ATM) and several catering outlets (there is catering on all platform islands except 13–15). A passenger information office and lounge are above the subway, the British Transport Police office and cycle racks are beyond, and at the western end is Platform 4, used by only a few trains. Alongside this is Platform 2, another bay platform but not signalled for passenger trains and used only for stabling empty trains, as is the former Motorail unloading bay alongside. At the far end of this track is the old Fish Dock, occasionally used for stabling engineers' on-track equipment. Beyond the end of the platform the tracks swing to the right (the west) and pass out of sight beneath Bath Road Bridge, a girder bridge that carries the A4 out of the city.

The first island platform comprises platforms 5 to 8. Platform 5 is inside the main train shed while 6 is a southerly extension and 7 and 8 were added outside the supporting wall in the 1930s. Platform 5 is used by trains towards Cardiff and platform 7 to Portsmouth; platforms 6 and 8 are the main platforms for Weston-super-Mare and stations to Penzance. Between platforms 5 and 7 are the two spur sidings that are long enough to stable a single Class 153 DMU.

The third island platform comprises platforms 9 to 12 and also dates from the 1930s. It is longer than platforms 5–8 but the rear of a High Speed Train on the west end platforms will block part of the east end platform. A wide variety of trains use these platforms, including to and from London Paddington and Weymouth.

The final island platform is shorter and only has east-end platforms 13 and 15: 15 is used by most trains from Paddington that continue westwards to Weston-super-Mare or beyond. Platform 13 is a terminus platform and is used by many trains from Paddington, some local services and occasionally by CrossCountry. There is another siding beyond platform 15 that used to be the In/out Road for Bristol Bath Road TMD. This depot has been demolished. Between platforms 3/4 and 5/6 are the Up Through line and the Middle Siding, the latter is often used to stable Mark 1 carriages between Torbay Express duties in the summer months. The Down Through line runs between platforms 11/12 and 13.

To the north of the station lies Arriva TrainCare's Barton Hill TMD, and to the south-east of the station lies St Philip's Marsh depot which services the Great Western Railway fleet. This is accessible from both ends of Temple Meads station.

Other facilities include pay phones, public Wi-Fi, a post box, photo booth, and passenger assistance such as information points, waiting rooms, a lost property office, first aid room, and CCTV.

In Britain's 100 Best Railway Stations by Simon Jenkins, the station was one of only ten to be awarded five stars.

== Passenger volume ==
Temple Meads is the busiest station in the Bristol area and the south west region. Official statistics show it to have the 35th-largest number of people entering or leaving any national rail station, the 14th busiest outside London. Comparing the year from April 2009 with the year from April 2002, estimated passenger numbers increased by 52%. (Note: Annual estimated passenger usage based on sales of tickets in stated financial year(s) which end or originate at Patchway, from Office of Rail and Road statistics. Methodology may vary year on year.)

Passenger Volume at Bristol Temple Meads
	2002–03	2004–05	2005–06	2006–07	2007–08	2008–09	2009–10	2010–11	2011–12	2012–13	2013–14	2014–15	2015–16	2016–17	2017–18	2018–19	2019–20	2020–21	2021–22	2022–23
Entries and exits	5,177,118	5,641,372	6,066,239	6,548,859	7,082,102	7,829,628	7,875,686	8,409,340	8,884,626	9,099,368	9,522,840	10,099,526	10,711,464	11,336,806	11,350,114	11,367,652	11,619,360	2,032,828	6,627,950	9,291,680
Interchanges	– (Note: No data available.)	798,961	856,644	917,595	845,907	890,706	979,955	1,107,555	1,327,179	1,386,664	1,434,465	1,474,684	1,477,458	1,512,601	1,477,064	1,453,933	1,631,569	277,488	970,539	1,242,101

The statistics cover twelve month periods that start in April.

== Services ==
=== Rail ===
GWR and CrossCountry trains at Bristol Temple Meads

Great Western Railway operates main line services between Bristol Temple Meads and London Paddington, some of which continue beyond Bristol to Weston-super-Mare or Taunton. The company also operates other routes through Bristol such as between Cardiff Central and Portsmouth Harbour, Cardiff Central and Taunton including extensions as far as Penzance, Worcester Foregate Street/Gloucester and Westbury/Weymouth, and Severn Beach and Weston-super-Mare. As of 2024, a trial of Saturday-only direct services to Oxford is underway.

Regular CrossCountry services run south to Paignton, Plymouth and Penzance and north to Birmingham New Street, Manchester Piccadilly, Derby, Leeds, Newcastle and Edinburgh. A limited number of services operate to other destinations in the north such as Glasgow Central and Aberdeen.

Preceding station	National Rail	Following station
Bristol Parkway	CrossCountry; Scotland and Northern England – South West England	Weston-super-Mare or Taunton
Bath Spa	Great Western Railway; Great Western Main Line	Nailsea & Backwell
Filton Abbey Wood	Great Western Railway; Cardiff Central – Penzance	Nailsea & Backwell
Filton Abbey Wood	Great Western Railway; Cardiff Central – Portsmouth	Bath Spa
Lawrence Hill	Great Western Railway; Worcester – Weymouth	Keynsham
Lawrence Hill	Great Western Railway; Severn Beach – Weston-super-Mare	Bedminster

=== Bus ===
Bus services at the station include the Airport Flyer A1 service, service 73 to UWE Frenchay, and metrobus route m2.

== Incidents ==
On 14 November 1909, suffragette activist Theresa Garnett attacked Winston Churchill – at the time an MP and government minister – with a dog whip at Temple Meads station, causing a cut on his face. She was arrested and jailed for a month.

== See also ==
- Rail services in Bristol
- Commuter rail in the United Kingdom
