= 73rd =

73rd is the ordinal form of the number 73. 73rd or Seventy-third may also refer to:

- A fraction, 1/73, equal to one of 73 equal parts

== Geography ==
- 73rd meridian east, a line of longitude 73° east of Greenwich
- 73rd meridian west, a line of longitude 73° west of Greenwich
- 73rd parallel north, a circle of latitude that is 73° north of the Earth's equatorial plane, in the Arctic
- 73rd parallel south, a circle of latitude that is 73° south of the Earth's equatorial plane, in the Antarctic

== Military ==
- 73rd (Perthshire) Regiment of Foot also known as MacLeod's Highlanders after its founder John Mackenzie, Lord MacLeod
- 73rd Carnatic Infantry, an infantry regiment of the British Indian Army
- 73rd Cavalry Regiment, a Cavalry Regiment in the U.S. Army first formed in 1941
- 73rd Field Artillery Regiment, a Field Artillery regiment of the United States Army
- 73rd Grey Cup, the 1985 Canadian Football League championship game at Olympic Stadium, Montreal
- 73rd Illinois Infantry Regiment, an infantry regiment that served in the Union Army during the American Civil War
- 73rd Indiana Infantry Regiment, an infantry regiment that served in the Union Army during the American Civil War
- 73rd Infantry Division (Wehrmacht), a German military unit which served during World War II
- 73rd Infantry Regiment (France), a French infantry regiment
- 73rd New York Infantry Regiment, an infantry regiment of Union Army in the American Civil War
- 73rd Ohio Infantry Regiment, an infantry regiment in the Union Army during the American Civil War
- 73rd Regiment of Foot (Invalids), an infantry regiment of the British Army from 1762 to 1768

== Government ==
- 73rd Delaware General Assembly, a meeting of the legislative branch of the state government
- 73rd Oregon Legislative Assembly, the Oregon Legislative Assembly (OLA)'s period from 2005 to 2006
- 73rd United States Congress, a meeting of the legislative branch of the United States federal government
- California's 73rd State Assembly district, one of 80 districts in the California State Assembly

== Other ==
- 73rd Academy Awards honored the best films of 2000 and was held on March 25, 2001
- 73rd century
- 73rd century BC

== See also ==
- 73 (disambiguation)
- AD 73, the year 73 (LXXIII) of the Julian calendar
