= 73rd Regiment =

73rd Regiment or 73rd Infantry Regiment may refer to:

- 73rd Regiment of Foot (disambiguation), several units with of the British Army
- 73rd Heavy Anti-Aircraft Regiment, Royal Artillery, a unit of the British Territorial Force
- 73rd Light Anti-Aircraft Regiment, Royal Artillery, a unit of the British Army
- 73rd Cavalry Regiment, a regiment of the US Army
- 73rd Field Artillery Regiment, a regiment of the US Army
- 73rd Infantry Regiment (France), a former unit of the French Army
- 73rd Fusilier Regiment, a Hanoverian regiment of the German Imperial Army

== Union Army (American Civil War) ==
- 73rd Illinois Infantry Regiment
- 73rd Indiana Infantry Regiment
- 73rd New York Infantry Regiment
- 73rd Ohio Infantry Regiment
- 73rd Pennsylvania Infantry Regiment

== See also ==
- 73rd Division (disambiguation)
