= 73rd Infantry Division (Russian Empire) =

73rdt Infantry Division
- 73-я пехотная дивизия
- Active: 1914–1918
- Country: Russian Empire
- Branch: Russian Imperial Army
- Role: Infantry

The 73rd Infantry Division (Russian: 73-я пехотная дивизия, 73-ya Pekhotnaya Diviziya) was an infantry formation of the Russian Imperial Army.

== Organization ==
- 1st Brigade
  - 289th Infantry Regiment
  - 290th Infantry Regiment
- 2nd Brigade
  - 291st Infantry Regiment
  - 292nd Infantry Regiment
