= 73rd Regiment of Foot (1758) =

- Active: 1758–1763
- Country: Kingdom of Great Britain (1707–1800)
- Branch: British Army
- Type: Infantry

The 73rd Regiment of Foot was a regiment in the British Army from 1758 to 1763. It was formed on 28 April 1758 from the 2nd Battalion of the 34th Regiment of Foot, and served in Ireland until it was disbanded in 1763.

== Regimental Colonels ==
- 1758–1763: Lt-Gen. William Browne
