= 73 Hengrove–UWE Frenchay Campus =

Bus route in England

73
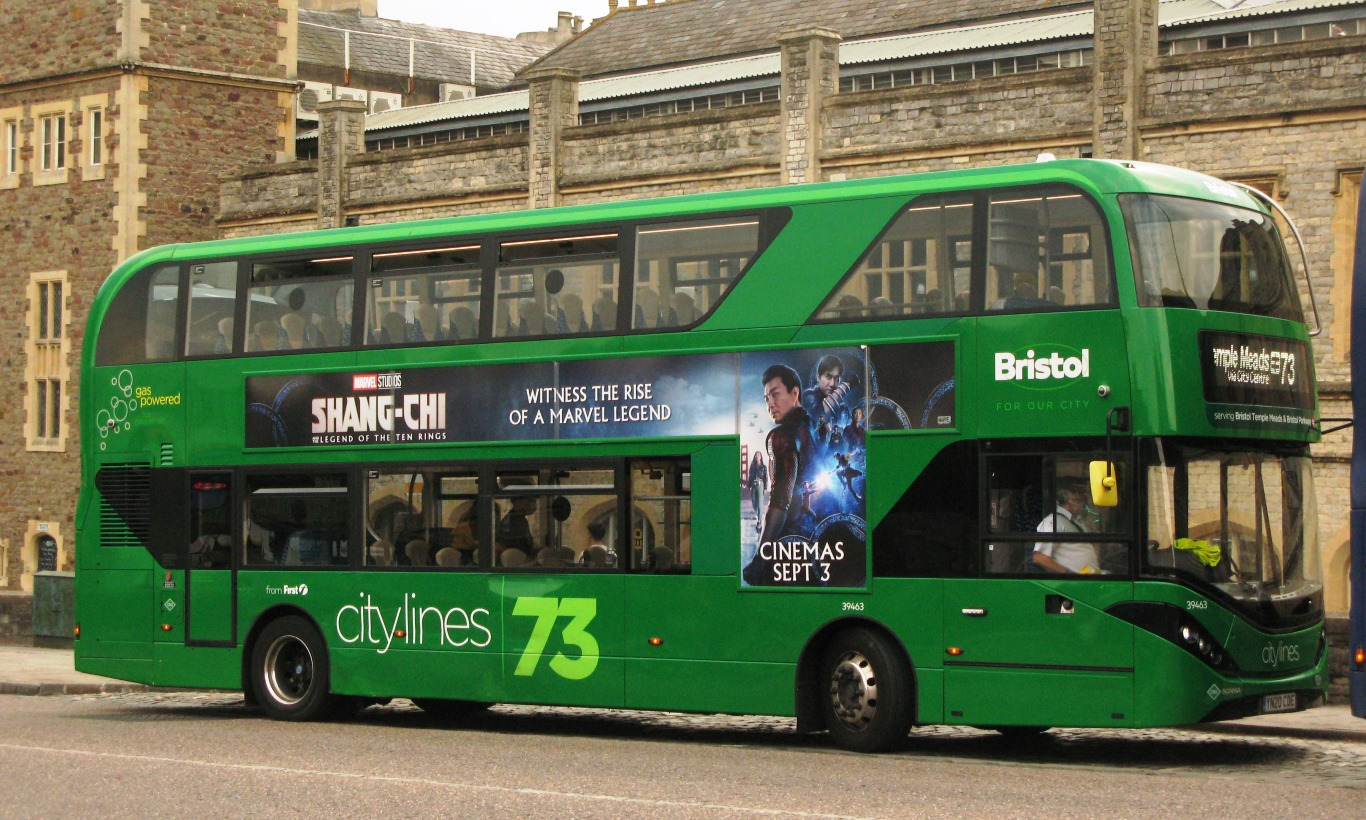
- First West of England 39463 operating the 73 at Bristol Temple Meads Station

Overview
- Operator: First West of England
- Garage: Hengrove
- Vehicle: Current: Wright Eclipse Gemini; Yutong U11DD; Former: Alexander Dennis Enviro400 City CBG; Wright StreetDeck; Wright Eclipse Gemini 2

Route
- Start: Hengrove
- Via: Whitchurch; Knowle; Bristol Temple Meads station City Centre; Gloucester Road; Lockleaze
- End: UWE Frenchay

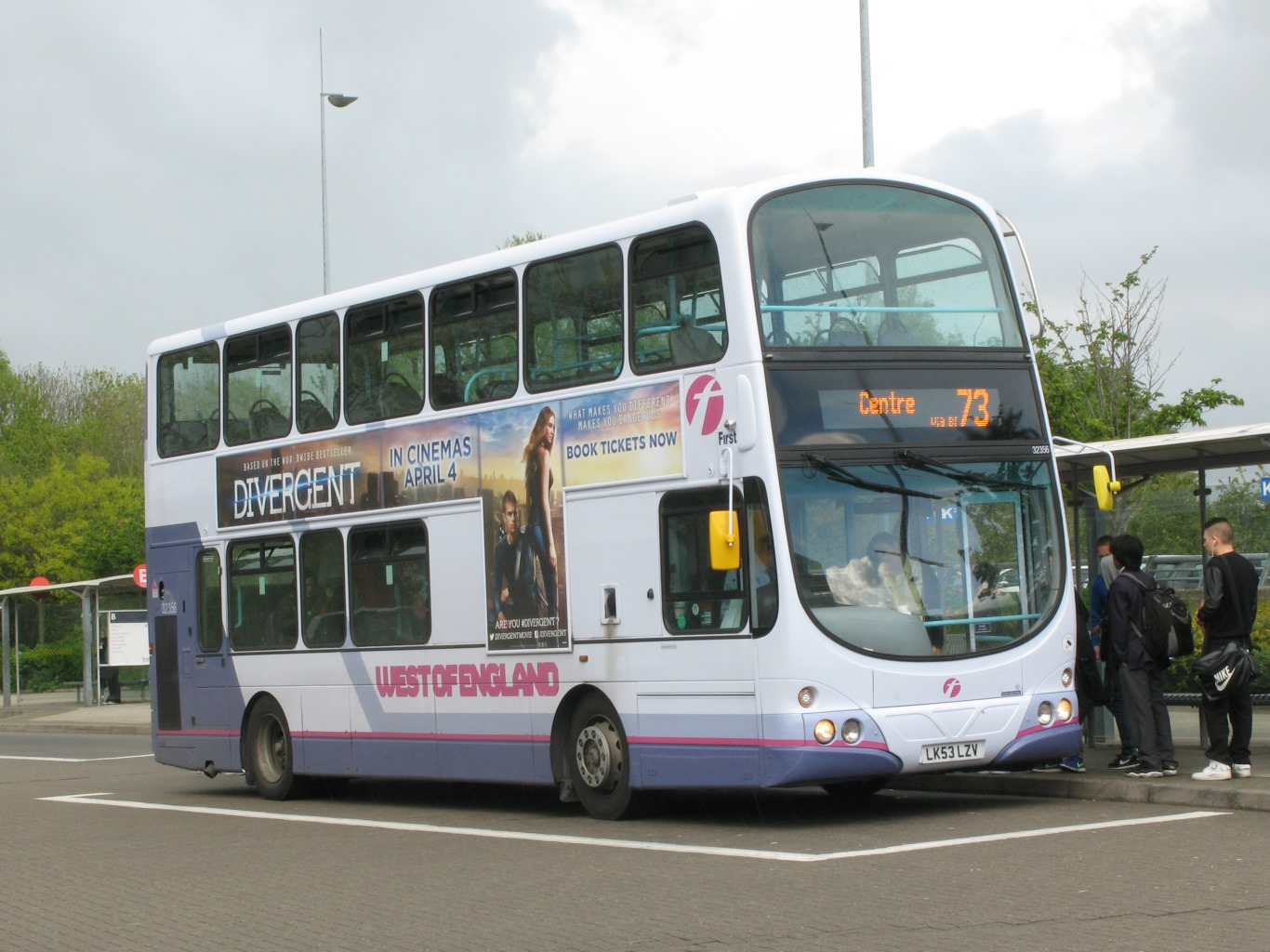
A bus operating on the route

The 73 is a bus route that operates between Hengrove and UWE Frenchay in Bristol. It is operated by First West of England.

== History ==
On 1 February 2009, parts of the route that served the Ministry of Defence Abbey Wood facility, Filton High School, and a peak-hours only loop around Aztec West were all withdrawn in order to reduce journey times. In 2010, the frequency during off-peak times was reduced from every 12 minutes to every 15 minutes.

Route number 74 was introduced in 2012 as a replacement for several withdrawn routes. Like route 73, it ran between Cribbs Causeway and the city centre, however route 74 took a different route through Bradley Stoke.

The former 74 bus route was merged with the 73 from 1 September 2013. The frequency of the combined route was a bus every 10 minutes during weekdays, every 15 minutes on Saturdays, and every 30 minutes on evenings and Sundays.

From 31 August 2014, the service frequency was reduced from 10 minutes to 12 minutes. From 4 September 2016, the peak service frequency was reduced from 12 minutes to 15 minutes and the route was extended to Temple Meads railway station.

In anticipation of a predicted drop in passenger numbers due to the introduction of MetroBus route m1 in January 2019, the route saw its frequency reduced to every 20 minutes.

In July 2020, biomethane powered Alexander Dennis Enviro400 City CBG buses were introduced on the route.

In January 2021, Monday-Friday services between Bristol Temple Meads and Bristol Parkway railway station were withdrawn, resulting in a reduced frequency of 30 minutes in this section.

From 30 January 2022, the route was shortened within Bradley Stoke by avoiding Baileys Court Road and Webbs Wood Road. From 22 January 2023, the northern section between Bradley Stoke and Cribbs Causeway was withdrawn following the introduction of the MetroBus route m4. In July 2023, it was announced that the route would be extended to Aztec West during non-peak times and would be combined with route 92, which ran between the city centre and Hengrove Park.

In September 2022, the extended route 73 began operating, covering the former route 92 between Whitchurch and Temple Gate. As a result, it no longer used biogas fuelled vehicles, as the responsibility for the route was transferred to Hengrove Depot, which did not have access to natural gas refuelling like the former depot, Lawrence Hill. It has since used primarily Wright Eclipse Geminis.

In September 2024, the route was again significantly altered, now being extended in the south to reach Hengrove Depot, and in the north it has been diverted to UWE Frenchay, having swapped the north end of its route with the 74 as part of major service changes enacted by First.

== Service ==
The service is operated by First West of England. The route formerly had a peak-times express numbered X73.
