= 73rd Anti-Aircraft Artillery Division =

- Active: November 1943–c. 1950s
- Country: Soviet Union
- Branch: Red Army (later Soviet Army)
- Type: Anti-Aircraft Artillery
- Engagements: World War II

The 73rd Anti-Aircraft Artillery Division (Russian: 73-я зенитная артиллерийская дивизия) was an anti-aircraft artillery division of the Soviet Union's Red Army (later the Soviet Army) during World War II and the early postwar period.

Formed in late 1943 in the Moscow Military District, the division conducted training for almost a year. It was sent to the front in September 1944 and fought in the Baltic region until the end of the war in Europe in May 1945. The 73rd was then transferred east and fought in the Soviet invasion of Manchuria in August. Postwar, it remained in the Far East and was disbanded by the end of the 1950s.

== World War II ==
The division began forming around 20 November 1943, when Colonel Vladimir Mityushin was appointed commander. It was part of the Moscow Military District, and included the 205th, 402nd, 430th, and 442nd Anti-Aircraft Artillery Regiments. From 2 February 1944, Lieutenant Colonel (promoted to colonel on 30 March) Vladimir German served as division commander.

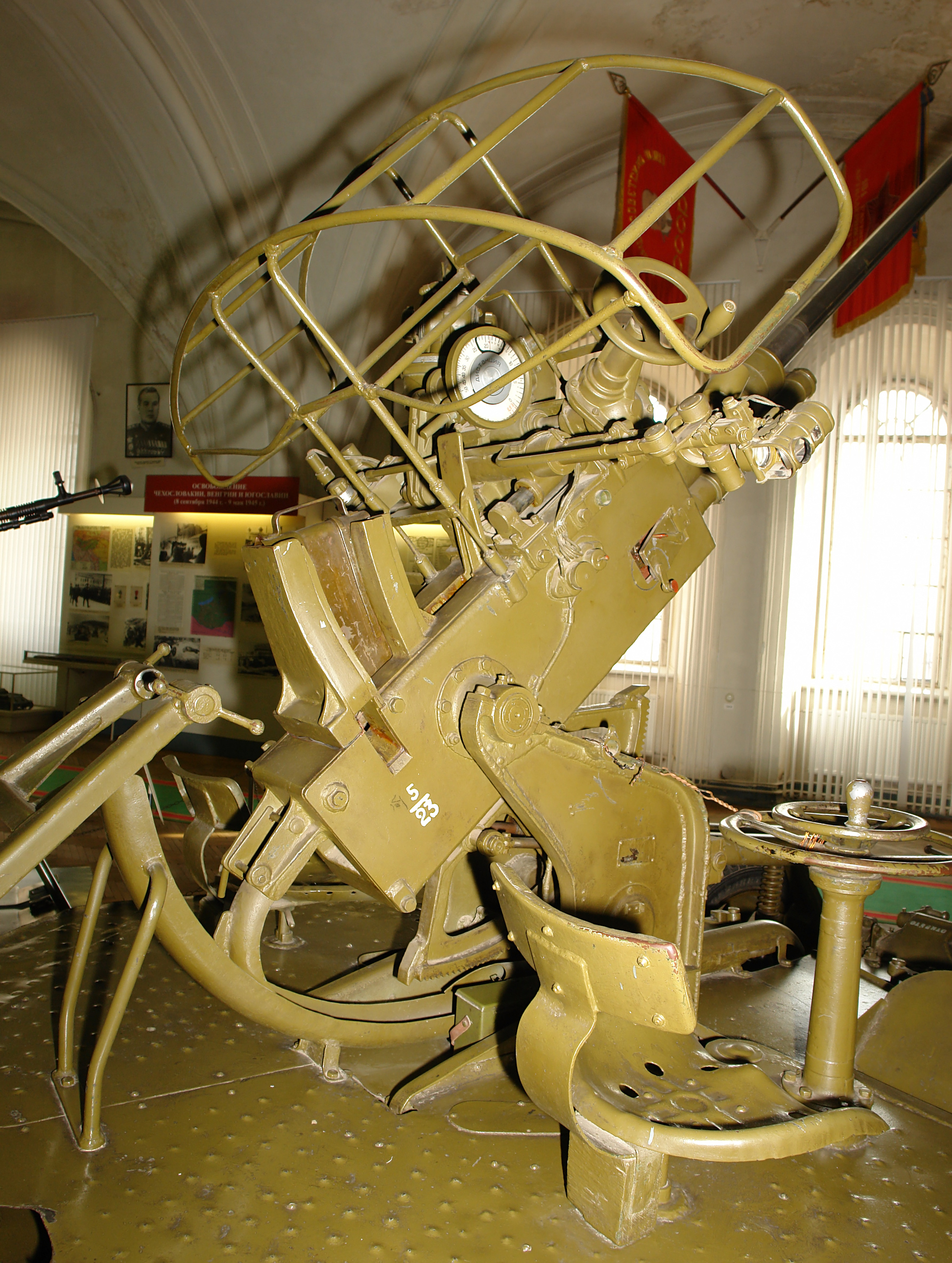
A 37 mm AA gun of the type used by the division during World War II

On 2 May, Colonel Vasily Ivashenko took command of the division while it was reorganizing at the Moscow Anti-Aircraft Artillery Training Camp; he would lead it for the rest of the war. In September the division was sent to the front as part of the 3rd Baltic Front's 1st Shock Army, fighting in the Riga Offensive. On 16 October the army transferred to the 2nd Baltic Front. The division then fought in the blockade of the surrounded German Army Group Courland in the Courland Pocket. Between September 1944 and February 1945, with the 1st Shock Army, the division was credited with downing nine German aircraft. In support of ground troops, it was credited with destroying four tanks, suppressing the fire of four mortar batteries, destroying ten pillboxes, and three observation points, as well as killing 340 German soldiers. In February 1945 the 73rd was transferred to the 4th Shock Army, with which it served until the end of the war. From 1 April the army was part of the Courland Group of Forces of the Leningrad Front.

After the end of the war in Europe, the division was transferred to the Far East to fight in the Soviet invasion of Manchuria. On 7 July it joined the Far Eastern Front's 15th Army. In the Soviet invasion of Manchuria, as part of the 2nd Far Eastern Front, the division supported the army in the Sungari Offensive. The 73rd covered the main group of the army in the crossing of the Amur River and the advance to Harbin.

== Postwar ==
Postwar, Ivashenko continued to command the division in the Far Eastern Military District, but died on 11 July 1946 in Petropavlovsk-Kamchatsky.

The division was among those anti-aircraft artillery divisions disbanded without being converted into another unit by the end of the 1950s.
