= 73rd Infantry Division (South Korea) =

- Active: 1 April 1987 - present
- Country: South Korea
- Branch: Republic of Korea Reserve Forces
- Type: Infantry
- Role: Reserve forces
- Size: Division
- Part of: Mobilization Force Command
- Garrison/HQ: Namyangju, Gyeonggi
- Nickname: "Unique loyalty(忠一)"

Commanders
- Current commander: Brig. Gen. Kim Byeong-gon

The 73rd Reserve Infantry Division (Korean: 제73동원보병사단) is a military formation of the Republic of Korea Reserve Forces (ROKA). The division was created on 1 April 1987. The division is subordinated to the Mobilization Force Command and is headquartered in Namyangju City, Gyeonggi Province. During peacetime, it is in charge of recruit training and active as a second line military unit.

== Organization ==
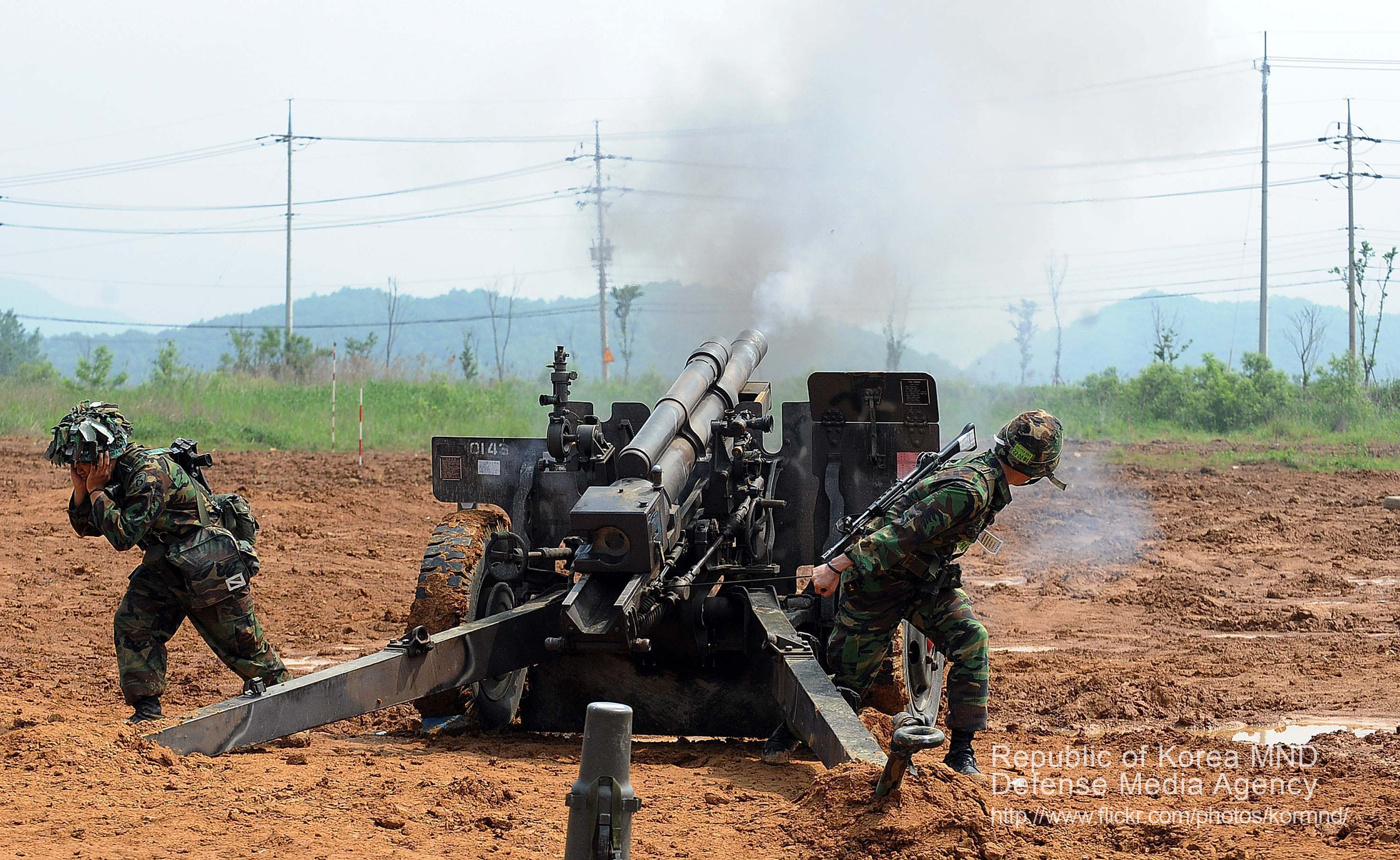
73rd Division artilleryman exercise with 105mm howitzer.

- Headquarters:
  - Headquarters Battalion
  - Reconnaissance Battalion
  - Engineer Battalion
  - Armor Battalion (M48A5K)
  - Chemical Company
  - Signal Battalion
  - Support Battalion
  - Medical Battalion
- 203rd Infantry Brigade
- 205th Infantry Brigade
- 206th Infantry Brigade
- Artillery Brigade
  - 3 Artillery Battalions (equipped with M101 howitzer)
  - Artillery Battalion (equipped with M114 howitzer)

== See also ==
- Korean Demilitarized Zone
