= AD 73 =

AD 73 in various calendars
- Gregorian calendar: AD 73; LXXIII
- Ab urbe condita: 826
- Assyrian calendar: 4823
- Balinese saka calendar: N/A
- Bengali calendar: −521 – −520
- Berber calendar: 1023
- Buddhist calendar: 617
- Burmese calendar: −565
- Byzantine calendar: 5581–5582
- Chinese calendar: 壬申年 (Water Monkey); 2770 or 2563 — to — 癸酉年 (Water Rooster); 2771 or 2564
- Coptic calendar: −211 – −210
- Discordian calendar: 1239
- Ethiopian calendar: 65–66
- Hebrew calendar: 3833–3834
- Hindu calendars
- Vikram Samvat: 129–130
- Shaka Samvat: N/A
- Kali Yuga: 3173–3174
- Holocene calendar: 10073
- Iranian calendar: 549 BP – 548 BP
- Islamic calendar: 566 BH – 565 BH
- Javanese calendar: N/A
- Julian calendar: AD 73; LXXIII
- Korean calendar: 2406
- Minguo calendar: 1839 before ROC 民前1839年
- Nanakshahi calendar: −1395
- Seleucid era: 384/385 AG
- Thai solar calendar: 615–616
- Tibetan calendar: ཆུ་ཕོ་སྤྲེ་ལོ་ (male Water-Monkey); 199 or −182 or −954 — to — ཆུ་མོ་བྱ་ལོ་ (female Water-Bird); 200 or −181 or −953

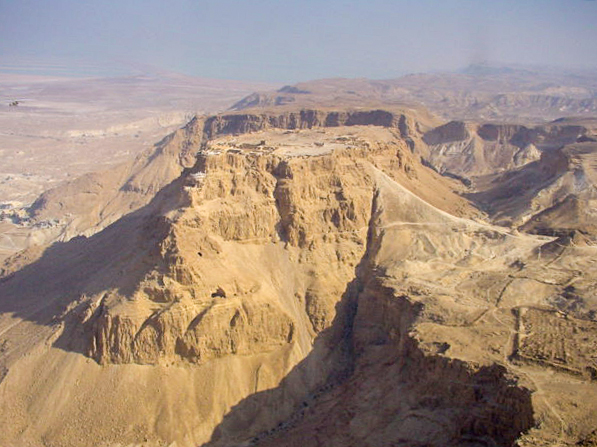
Fortress Masada

AD 73 (LXXIII) was a common year starting on Friday of the Julian calendar. At the time, it was known as the Year of the Consulship of Domitian and Messalinus (or, less frequently, year 826 Ab urbe condita). The denomination AD 73 for this year has been used since the early medieval period, when the Anno Domini calendar era became the prevalent method in Europe for naming years.

== Events ==
=== By place ===
==== Roman Empire ====
- Vespasian and Titus are appointed to be Roman censors.
- Spring – The Roman governor Lucius Flavius Silva lays siege to Masada, the last outpost of the Jewish rebels following the end, in AD 70, of the First Jewish-Roman War (Jewish Revolt). The Roman army (Legio X Fretensis) surrounds the mountain fortress with a 7-mile long siege wall (circumvallation) and builds a rampart of stones and beaten earth against the western approach. After the citadel is conquered, 960 Zealots under the leadership of Eleazar ben Ya'ir commit mass suicide when defeat becomes imminent.
- Pliny the Elder serves as procurator in Hispania Tarraconensis.
- Titus Flavius Domitianus becomes Roman Consul.
- Emperor Vespasian begins conquest of territory east of the upper Rhine and south of the Main. In addition, he reorganizes the defenses of the upper and lower Danube.

==== Asia ====
- February – The Chinese Han dynasty launches a major campaign against the Xiongnu, whom they confront in the Battle of Yiwulu in the Kumul oasis, an ultimate Han military victory led by General Dou Gu (d. AD 88).
- Ban Chao (Pan-Ch’ao), competing with the Xiongnu, imposes a Chinese protectorate on the kings of Lop Nor and Khotan in the Tarim Basin, with the aim of controlling the Silk Road.

=== By topic ===
==== Arts and sciences ====
- Martial writes a satire on "military cowardice".

== Births ==
- Titus Flavius Hyrcanus, Roman aristocrat
