= Yarsky =

Yarsky (Russian: Ярский; masculine) or Yarskoy (Ярской; masculine), Yarskaya (Ярская; feminine), or Yarskoye (Ярское; neuter) is the name of several rural localities in Russia:

- Yarsky (rural locality), a settlement in Millerovsky District of Rostov Oblast
- Yarskoy, a khutor under the jurisdiction of the urban-type settlement of Chernyshkovsky, Volgograd Oblast
- Yarskoye, name of several rural localities

== See also ==
- Yarskoy 1-y, a khutor in Kumylzhensky District of Volgograd Oblast
- Yarskoy 2-y, a khutor in Kumylzhensky District of Volgograd Oblast
