= Andreyanovsky =

Andreyanovsky Андреяновский
- Khutor
- Location within Volgograd Oblast Location within Russia
- Coordinates: 49°43′N 42°16′E
- Country: Russia
- Region: Volgograd Oblast
- District: Kumylzhensky District
- Time zone: UTC+4:00

Andreyanovsky (Russian: Андреяновский) is a rural locality (a khutor) in Bukanovskoye Rural Settlement, Kumylzhensky District, Volgograd Oblast, Russia. The population was 6 as of 2010.

== Geography ==
Andreyanovsky is located on Khopyorsko-Buzulukskaya Plain, 45 km southwest of Kumylzhenskaya (the district's administrative centre) by road. Belenky is the nearest rural locality.
