= Samoylovsky (rural locality) =

Samoylovsky (Russian: Самойловский; masculine), Samoylovskaya (Самойловская; feminine), or Samoylovskoye (Самойловское; neuter) is the name of several rural localities in Russia.

== Modern localities ==
- Samoylovsky, Astrakhan Oblast, a settlement in Kozlovsky Selsoviet of Volodarsky District in Astrakhan Oblast; 46°28′N 48°42′E
- Samoylovsky, Orenburg Oblast, a khutor in Novonikolsky Selsoviet of Sharlyksky District in Orenburg Oblast
- Samoylovsky, Volgograd Oblast, a khutor in Kumylzhensky Selsoviet of Kumylzhensky District in Volgograd Oblast
- Samoylovskaya, a village in Vozhegodsky Selsoviet of Vozhegodsky District in Vologda Oblast

== Alternative names ==
- Samoylovskaya, alternative name of Samylovskaya, a village in Kozminsky Selsoviet of Lensky District in Arkhangelsk Oblast; 61°48′N 48°23′E
