= Bolsheternovoy =

Bolsheternovoy Большетерновой
- Khutor
- Location within Volgograd Oblast Location within Russia
- Coordinates: 48°29′N 42°27′E
- Country: Russia
- Region: Volgograd Oblast
- District: Chernyshkovsky District
- Time zone: UTC+4:00

Bolsheternovoy (Russian: Большетерновой) is a rural locality (a khutor) and the administrative center of Bolsheternovskoye Rural Settlement, Chernyshkovsky District, Volgograd Oblast, Russia. The population was 576 as of 2010. There are 7 streets.

== Geography ==
Bolsheternovoy is located 22 km northeast of Chernyshkovsky (the district's administrative centre) by road. Maloternovoy is the nearest rural locality.
