= Sulyayevsky =

Sulyayevsky Суляевский
- Khutor
- Location within Volgograd Oblast Location within Russia
- Coordinates: 50°04′N 42°37′E
- Country: Russia
- Region: Volgograd Oblast
- District: Kumylzhensky District
- Time zone: UTC+4:00

Sulyayevsky (Russian: Суляевский) is a rural locality (a khutor) and the administrative center of Sulyayevskoye Rural Settlement, Kumylzhensky District, Volgograd Oblast, Russia. The population was 682 as of 2010. There are 18 streets.

== Geography ==
Sulyayevsky is located in forest steppe, on Khopyorsko-Buzulukskaya Plain, on the bank of the Kumylga River, 25 km north of Kumylzhenskaya (the district's administrative centre) by road. Tyurinsky is the nearest rural locality.
