= Krasny Bogdan =

Krasny Bogdan Красный Богдан
- Khutor
- Location within Volgograd Oblast Location within Russia
- Coordinates: 48°18′N 42°29′E
- Country: Russia
- Region: Volgograd Oblast
- District: Chernyshkovsky District
- Time zone: UTC+4:00

Krasny Bogdan (Russian: Красный Богдан) is a rural locality (a khutor) in Yulkinskoye Rural Settlement, Chernyshkovsky District, Volgograd Oblast, Russia. The population was 82 as of 2010.

== Geography ==
Krasny Bogdan is located 29 km southeast of Chernyshkovsky (the district's administrative centre) by road. Yolkino is the nearest rural locality.
