= Chiganaki 2-ye =

Chiganaki 2-ye Чиганаки 2-е
- Khutor
- Location within Volgograd Oblast Location within Russia
- Coordinates: 49°45′N 42°42′E
- Country: Russia
- Region: Volgograd Oblast
- District: Kumylzhensky District
- Time zone: UTC+4:00

Chiganaki 2-ye (Russian: Чиганаки 2-е) is a rural locality (a khutor) in Krasnyanskoye Rural Settlement, Kumylzhensky District, Volgograd Oblast, Russia. The population was 298 as of 2010. There are 11 streets.

== Geography ==
Chiganaki 2-ye is located in forest steppe, on Khopyorsko-Buzulukskaya Plain, 41 km southeast of Kumylzhenskaya (the district's administrative centre) by road. Kozlov is the nearest rural locality.
