= Filyaty =

Filyaty Филяты
- Khutor
- Location within Volgograd Oblast Location within Russia
- Coordinates: 49°59′N 42°21′E
- Country: Russia
- Region: Volgograd Oblast
- District: Kumylzhensky District
- Time zone: UTC+4:00

Filyaty (Russian: Филяты) is a rural locality (a khutor) in Popovskoye Rural Settlement, Kumylzhensky District, Volgograd Oblast, Russia. The population was 7 as of 2010.

== Geography ==
Filyaty is located in forest steppe, on Khopyorsko-Buzulukskaya Plain, on the bank of the Khopyor River, 59 km northwest of Kumylzhenskaya (the district's administrative centre) by road. Fedoseyevskaya is the nearest rural locality.
