= Fedoseyevskaya =

Fedoseyevskaya Федосеевская
- Stanitsa
- Location within Volgograd Oblast Location within Russia
- Coordinates: 49°58′46″N 42°20′42″E
- Country: Russia
- Region: Volgograd Oblast
- District: Kumylzhensky District
- Time zone: UTC+4:00

Fedoseyevskaya (Russian: Федосеевская) is a rural locality (a stanitsa) in Popovskoye Rural Settlement, Kumylzhensky District, Volgograd Oblast, Russia. The population was 48 as of 2010.

== Geography ==
Fedoseyevskaya is located in forest steppe, on Khopyorsko-Buzulukskaya Plain, on the bank of the Khopyor River, 56 km northwest of Kumylzhenskaya (the district's administrative centre) by road. Filyaty is the nearest rural locality.
