= Ostroukhov =

Ostroukhov Остроухов
- Khutor
- Location within Volgograd Oblast Location within Russia
- Coordinates: 49°46′N 42°26′E
- Country: Russia
- Region: Volgograd Oblast
- District: Kumylzhensky District
- Time zone: UTC+4:00

Ostroukhov (Russian: Остроухов) is a rural locality (a khutor) in Slashchyovskoye Rural Settlement, Kumylzhensky District, Volgograd Oblast, Russia. The population was 346 as of 2010. There are 15 streets.

== Geography ==
Ostroukhov is located in forest steppe, on Khopyorsko-Buzulukskaya Plain, on the bank of the Khopyor River, 28 km southwest of Kumylzhenskaya (the district's administrative centre) by road. Devkin is the nearest rural locality.
