= Podkovsky =

Podkovsky Подковский
- Khutor
- Location within Volgograd Oblast Location within Russia
- Coordinates: 49°55′N 42°14′E
- Country: Russia
- Region: Volgograd Oblast
- District: Kumylzhensky District
- Time zone: UTC+4:00

Podkovsky (Russian: Подковский) is a rural locality (a khutor) in Slashchyovskoye Rural Settlement, Kumylzhensky District, Volgograd Oblast, Russia. The population was 74 as of 2010. There are 2 streets.

== Geography ==
Podkovsky is located in forest steppe, on Khopyorsko-Buzulukskaya Plain, 41 km west of Kumylzhenskaya (the district's administrative centre) by road. Filin is the nearest rural locality.
