= Aseyev, Volgograd Oblast =

Aseyev Асеев
- Khutor
- Location within Volgograd Oblast Location within Russia
- Coordinates: 48°17′N 42°21′E
- Country: Russia
- Region: Volgograd Oblast
- District: Chernyshkovsky District
- Time zone: UTC+4:00

Aseyev (Russian: Асеев) is a rural locality (a khutor) in Yulkinskoye Rural Settlement, Chernyshkovsky District, Volgograd Oblast, Russia. The population was 53 as of 2010.

== Geography ==
Aseyev is located 20 km southeast of Chernyshkovsky (the district's administrative centre) by road. Yolkino is the nearest rural locality.
