= Kosoklyuchansky =

Kosoklyuchansky Косоключанский
- Khutor
- Location within Volgograd Oblast Location within Russia
- Coordinates: 49°49′N 42°25′E
- Country: Russia
- Region: Volgograd Oblast
- District: Kumylzhensky District
- Time zone: UTC+4:00

Kosoklyuchansky (Russian: Косоключанский) is a rural locality (a khutor) in Slashchyovskoye Rural Settlement, Kumylzhensky District, Volgograd Oblast, Russia. The population was 8 as of 2010. There are 3 streets.

== Geography ==
Kosoklyuchansky is located on the right bank of the Khopyor River, 22 km southwest of Kumylzhenskaya (the district's administrative centre) by road. Ostroukhov is the nearest rural locality.
