= Potapovsky =

Potapovsky Потаповский
- Khutor
- Location within Volgograd Oblast Location within Russia
- Coordinates: 49°56′N 42°42′E
- Country: Russia
- Region: Volgograd Oblast
- District: Kumylzhensky District
- Time zone: UTC+4:00

Potapovsky (Russian: Потаповский) is a rural locality (a khutor) in Kumylzhenskoye Rural Settlement, Kumylzhensky District, Volgograd Oblast, Russia. The population was 144 as of 2010. There are 4 streets.

== Geography ==
Potapovsky is located in forest steppe, on Khopyorsko-Buzulukskaya Plain, on the bank of the Sukhodol River, 15 km northeast of Kumylzhenskaya (the district's administrative centre) by road. Sigayevsky is the nearest rural locality.
