= Zhuravka, Chernyshkovsky District, Volgograd Oblast =

Zhuravka Журавка
- Khutor
- Location within Volgograd Oblast Location within Russia
- Coordinates: 48°18′N 42°18′E
- Country: Russia
- Region: Volgograd Oblast
- District: Chernyshkovsky District
- Time zone: UTC+4:00

Zhuravka (Russian: Журавка) is a rural locality (a khutor) in Verkhnegnutovskoye Rural Settlement, Chernyshkovsky District, Volgograd Oblast, Russia. The population was 96 as of 2010.

== Geography ==
Zhuravka is located on the Don Plain, on the Tsimla River, 15 km southeast of Chernyshkovsky (the district's administrative centre) by road. Yolkino is the nearest rural locality.
