= Verkhnegnutov =

Verkhnegnutov Верхнегнутов
- Khutor
- Location within Volgograd Oblast Location within Russia
- Coordinates: 48°14′N 42°14′E
- Country: Russia
- Region: Volgograd Oblast
- District: Chernyshkovsky District
- Time zone: UTC+4:00

Verkhnegnutov (Russian: Верхнегнутов) is a rural locality (a khutor) and the administrative center of Verkhnegnutovskoye Rural Settlement, Chernyshkovsky District, Volgograd Oblast, Russia. The population was 780 as of 2010. There are 13 streets.

== Geography ==
Verkhnegnutov is located on the Don Plain, on southwest of Chernyshkovsky District, on the Tsimla River, 21 km south of Chernyshkovsky (the district's administrative centre) by road. Biryukov is the nearest rural locality.
