= Kuznechinsky =

Kuznechinsky Кузнечинский
- Khutor
- Location within Volgograd Oblast Location within Russia
- Coordinates: 49°58′N 42°11′E
- Country: Russia
- Region: Volgograd Oblast
- District: Kumylzhensky District
- Time zone: UTC+4:00

Kuznechinsky (Russian: Кузнечинский) is a rural locality (a khutor) in Popovskoye Rural Settlement, Kumylzhensky District, Volgograd Oblast, Russia. The population was 38 as of 2010.

== Geography ==
Kuznechinsky is located in forest steppe, on Khopyorsko-Buzulukskaya Plain, on the bank of the Yedovlya River, 53 km northwest of Kumylzhenskaya (the district's administrative centre) by road. Filin is the nearest rural locality.
