= Chiganaki 1-ye =

Chiganaki 1-ye Чиганаки 1-е
- Khutor
- Location within Volgograd Oblast Location within Russia
- Coordinates: 49°47′N 42°43′E
- Country: Russia
- Region: Volgograd Oblast
- District: Kumylzhensky District
- Time zone: UTC+4:00

Chiganaki 1-ye (Russian: Чиганаки 1-е) is a rural locality (a khutor) in Krasnyanskoye Rural Settlement, Kumylzhensky District, Volgograd Oblast, Russia. The population was 138 as of 2010.

== Geography ==
Chiganaki 1-ye is located in forest steppe, on Khopyorsko-Buzulukskaya Plain, 38 km southeast of Kumylzhenskaya (the district's administrative centre) by road. Chiginaki 2-ye is the nearest rural locality.
