= Mitkin, Kumylzhensky District, Volgograd Oblast =

Mitkin Митькин
- Khutor
- Location within Volgograd Oblast Location within Russia
- Coordinates: 49°44′N 42°15′E
- Country: Russia
- Region: Volgograd Oblast
- District: Kumylzhensky District
- Time zone: UTC+4:00

Mitkin (Russian: Митькин) is a rural locality (a khutor) in Bukanovskoye Rural Settlement, Kumylzhensky District, Volgograd Oblast, Russia. The population was 20 as of 2010.

== Geography ==
Mitkin is located in forest steppe, on Khopyorsko-Buzulukskaya Plain, on the Rastverdyayevka River, 48 km southwest of Kumylzhenskaya (the district's administrative centre) by road. Andreyanovsky is the nearest rural locality.
