= Pristenovsky =

Pristenovsky Пристеновский
- Khutor
- Location within Volgograd Oblast Location within Russia
- Coordinates: 48°15′N 42°52′E
- Country: Russia
- Region: Volgograd Oblast
- District: Chernyshkovsky District
- Time zone: UTC+4:00

Pristenovsky (Russian: Пристеновский) is a rural locality (a khutor) and the administrative center of Pristenovskoye Rural Settlement, Chernyshkovsky District, Volgograd Oblast, Russia. The population was 281 as of 2010. There are 2 streets.

== Geography ==
Pristenovsky is located on the bank of the Solonaya River, 68 km southeast of Chernyshkovsky (the district's administrative centre) by road. Vodyanovsky is the nearest rural locality.
