= Kraptsovsky =

Kraptsovsky Крапцовский
- Khutor
- Location within Volgograd Oblast Location within Russia
- Coordinates: 49°57′N 42°36′E
- Country: Russia
- Region: Volgograd Oblast
- District: Kumylzhensky District
- Time zone: UTC+4:00

Kraptsovsky (Russian: Крапцовский) is a rural locality (a khutor) in Sulyayevskoye Rural Settlement, Kumylzhensky District, Volgograd Oblast, Russia. The population was 19 as of 2010.

== Geography ==
Kraptsovsky is located in forest steppe, on Khopyorsko-Buzulukskaya Plain, on the bank of the Kumylga River, 14 km north of Kumylzhenskaya (the district's administrative centre) by road.
