= Vodyanovsky =

Vodyanovsky Водяновский
- Khutor
- Location within Volgograd Oblast Location within Russia
- Coordinates: 48°13′N 42°51′E
- Country: Russia
- Region: Volgograd Oblast
- District: Chernyshkovsky District
- Time zone: UTC+4:00

Vodyanovsky (Russian: Водяновский) is a rural locality (a khutor) in Pristenovskoye Rural Settlement, Chernyshkovsky District, Volgograd Oblast, Russia. The population was 144 as of 2010. There are 2 streets.

== Geography ==
Vodyanovsky is located on 63 km southeast of Chernyshkovsky (the district's administrative centre) by road. Pristenovsky is the nearest rural locality.
