= Kuchurovsky =

Kuchurovsky Кучуровский
- Khutor
- Location within Volgograd Oblast Location within Russia
- Coordinates: 49°57′N 42°24′E
- Country: Russia
- Region: Volgograd Oblast
- District: Kumylzhensky District
- Time zone: UTC+4:00

Kuchurovsky (Russian: Кучуровский) is a rural locality (a khutor) in Kumylzhenskoye Rural Settlement, Kumylzhensky District, Volgograd Oblast, Russia. The population was 87 as of 2010. There are 3 streets.

== Geography ==
Kuchurovsky is located in forest steppe, on Khopyorsko-Buzulukskaya Plain, on the bank of the Stary Khopyor River, 21 km northwest of Kumylzhenskaya (the district's administrative centre) by road. Krasnoarmeysky is the nearest rural locality.
