= Krasnyansky =

Krasnyansky Краснянский
- Khutor
- Location within Volgograd Oblast Location within Russia
- Coordinates: 49°42′N 42°38′E
- Country: Russia
- Region: Volgograd Oblast
- District: Kumylzhensky District
- Time zone: UTC+4:00

Krasnyansky (Russian: Краснянский) is a rural locality (a khutor) and the administrative center of Krasnyanskoye Rural Settlement, Kumylzhensky District, Volgograd Oblast, Russia. The population was 166 as of 2010. There are 3 streets.

== Geography ==
Krasnyansky is located in forest steppe, on Khopyorsko-Buzulukskaya Plain, on the right bank of the Medveditsa River, 50 km south of Kumylzhenskaya (the district's administrative centre) by road. Kozlov is the nearest rural locality.
