= Skurishenskaya =

Skurishenskaya Скуришенская
- Stanitsa
- Location within Volgograd Oblast Location within Russia
- Coordinates: 49°50′N 42°55′E
- Country: Russia
- Region: Volgograd Oblast
- District: Kumylzhensky District
- Time zone: UTC+4:00

Skurishenskaya (Russian: Скуришенская) is a rural locality (a stanitsa) in Glazunovskoye Rural Settlement, Kumylzhensky District, Volgograd Oblast, Russia. The population was 799 as of 2010. There are 17 streets.

== Geography ==
Skurishenskaya is located in forest steppe, on Khopyorsko-Buzulukskaya Plain, on the right bank of the Medveditsa River, 33 km southeast of Kumylzhenskaya (the district's administrative centre) by road. Blizhny is the nearest rural locality.
