= Yolkino, Volgograd Oblast =

Yolkino Ёлкино
- Khutor
- Location within Volgograd Oblast Location within Russia
- Coordinates: 48°18′N 42°21′E
- Country: Russia
- Region: Volgograd Oblast
- District: Chernyshkovsky District
- Time zone: UTC+4:00

Yolkino (Russian: Ёлкино) is a rural locality (a khutor) and the administrative center of Yulkinskoye Rural Settlement, Chernyshkovsky District, Volgograd Oblast, Russia. The population was 445 as of 2010. There are 9 streets.

== Geography ==
Yolkino is located 18 km southeast of Chernyshkovsky (the district's administrative centre) by road. Aseyev is the nearest rural locality.
