= Klyuchi, Volgograd Oblast =

Klyuchi Ключи
- Khutor
- Location within Volgograd Oblast Location within Russia
- Coordinates: 49°49′N 42°35′E
- Country: Russia
- Region: Volgograd Oblast
- District: Kumylzhensky District
- Time zone: UTC+4:00

Klyuchi (Russian: Ключи) is a rural locality (a khutor) in Kumylzhenskoye Rural Settlement, Kumylzhensky District, Volgograd Oblast, Russia. The population was 22 as of 2010.

== Geography ==
Klyuchi is located in forest steppe, on Khopyorsko-Buzulukskaya Plain, 6 km south of Kumylzhenskaya (the district's administrative centre) by road. Kumylzhenskaya is the nearest rural locality.
