= Shakin, Volgograd Oblast =

Shakin Шакин
- Khutor
- Location within Volgograd Oblast Location within Russia
- Coordinates: 49°51′N 42°11′E
- Country: Russia
- Region: Volgograd Oblast
- District: Kumylzhensky District
- Time zone: UTC+4:00

Shakin (Russian: Шакин) is a rural locality (a khutor) and the administrative center of Shakinskoye Rural Settlement, Kumylzhensky District, Volgograd Oblast, Russia. The population was 635 as of 2010. There are 15 streets.

== Geography ==
Shakin is located in forest steppe, on Khopyorsko-Buzulukskaya Plain, on the bank of the Rastverdyayevka River, 36 km west of Kumylzhenskaya (the district's administrative centre) by road. Slashchevskaya is the nearest rural locality.
