= Lyubishensky =

Lyubishensky Любишенский
- Khutor
- Location within Volgograd Oblast Location within Russia
- Coordinates: 49°52′N 41°55′E
- Country: Russia
- Region: Volgograd Oblast
- District: Kumylzhensky District
- Time zone: UTC+4:00

Lyubishensky (Russian: Любишенский) is a rural locality (a khutor) in Belogorskoye Rural Settlement, Kumylzhensky District, Volgograd Oblast, Russia. The population was 136 as of 2010.

== Geography ==
Lyubishensky is located on Khopyorsko-Buzulukskaya Plain, 56 km west of Kumylzhenskaya (the district's administrative centre) by road. Belogorsky is the nearest rural locality.
