= Filin, Kumylzhensky District, Volgograd Oblast =

Filin Филин
- Khutor
- Location within Volgograd Oblast Location within Russia
- Coordinates: 49°57′N 42°15′E
- Country: Russia
- Region: Volgograd Oblast
- District: Kumylzhensky District
- Time zone: UTC+4:00

Filin (Russian: Филин) is a rural locality (a khutor) in Popovskoye Rural Settlement, Kumylzhensky District, Volgograd Oblast, Russia. The population was 419 as of 2010. There are 10 streets.

== Geography ==
Filin is located in forest steppe, on Khopyorsko-Buzulukskaya Plain, 47 km northwest of Kumylzhenskaya (the district's administrative centre) by road. Podkovsky is the nearest rural locality.
