= Maloternovoy =

Maloternovoy Малотерновой
- Khutor
- Location within Volgograd Oblast Location within Russia
- Coordinates: 48°29′N 42°28′E
- Country: Russia
- Region: Volgograd Oblast
- District: Chernyshkovsky District
- Time zone: UTC+4:00

Maloternovoy (Russian: Малотерновой) is a rural locality (a khutor) in Bolsheternovskoye Rural Settlement, Chernyshkovsky District, Volgograd Oblast, Russia. The population was 264 as of 2010. There are 4 streets.

== Geography ==
Maloternovoy is located on the Don plain in southwest of Vologda Oblast, 23 km northeast of Chernyshkovsky (the district's administrative centre) by road. Bolsheternovoy is the nearest rural locality.
