= Volotsky =

Volotsky Волоцкий
- Khutor
- Location within Volgograd Oblast Location within Russia
- Coordinates: 48°22′N 42°12′E
- Country: Russia
- Region: Volgograd Oblast
- District: Chernyshkovsky District
- Time zone: UTC+4:00

Volotsky (Russian: Волоцкий) is a rural locality (a khutor) Chernyshkovskoye Urban Settlement, Chernyshkovsky District, Volgograd Oblast, Russia. The population was 521 as of 2010. There are 5 streets.

== Geography ==
Volotsky is located 8 km southwest of Chernyshkovsky (the district's administrative centre) by road. Chernyshkovsky is the nearest rural locality.
