= Slashchyovskaya =

Slashchyovskaya Слащёвская
- Stanitsa
- Location within Volgograd Oblast Location within Russia
- Coordinates: 49°51′N 42°20′E
- Country: Russia
- Region: Volgograd Oblast
- District: Kumylzhensky District
- Time zone: UTC+4:00

Slashchyovskaya (Russian: Слащёвская) is a rural locality (a stanitsa) and the administrative center of Slashchyovskoye Rural Settlement, Kumylzhensky District, Volgograd Oblast, Russia. The population was 1,288 as of 2010. There are 43 streets.

== Geography ==
Slashchyovskaya is located on the right bank of the Khopyor River, 31 km southwest of Kumylzhenskaya (the district's administrative centre) by road. Shakin is the nearest rural locality.
