= Akolzin, Volgograd Oblast =

Akolzin Акользин
- Khutor
- Location within Volgograd Oblast Location within Russia
- Coordinates: 48°11′N 42°39′E
- Country: Russia
- Region: Volgograd Oblast
- District: Chernyshkovsky District

Population (2010)
  - Total: 3
- Time zone: UTC+4:00

Akolzin (Russian: Акользин) is a rural locality (a khutor) in Tormosinovskoye Rural Settlement, Chernyshkovsky District, Volgograd Oblast, Russia. The population was 3 as of 2010. There is 1 street.

== Geography ==
Akolzin is located on Don Plain, on southwest of Volgograd Oblast, 43 km southeast of Chernyshkovsky (the district's administrative centre) by road. Tormosin is the nearest rural locality.
