= Alyoshkin =

Alyoshkin Алёшкин
- Khutor
- Location within Volgograd Oblast Location within Russia
- Coordinates: 48°14′N 42°38′E
- Country: Russia
- Region: Volgograd Oblast
- District: Chernyshkovsky District
- Time zone: UTC+4:00

Alyoshkin (Russian: Алёшкин) is a rural locality (a khutor) and the administrative center of Alyoshkinskoye Rural Settlement, Chernyshkovsky District, Volgograd Oblast, Russia. The population was 442 as of 2010. There are 9 streets.

== Geography ==
Alyoshkin is located on Don Plain, on southwest of Volgograd Oblast, on Aksenets River, 44 km southeast of Chernyshkovsky (the district's administrative centre) by road. Akolzin is the nearest rural locality.
