= Chernyshkovsky =

Chernyshkovsky (masculine), Chernyshkovskaya (feminine), or Chernyshkovskoye (neuter) may refer to:

- Chernyshkovsky District, a district of Volgograd Oblast, Russia
- Chernyshkovsky (urban-type settlement), an urban locality (a work settlement) in Chernyshkovsky District of Volgograd Oblast, Russia
