= Tochilkin =

Tochilkin Точилкин
- Khutor
- Location within Volgograd Oblast Location within Russia
- Coordinates: 49°44′N 42°41′E
- Country: Russia
- Region: Volgograd Oblast
- District: Kumylzhensky District
- Time zone: UTC+4:00

Tochilkin (Russian: Точилкин) is a rural locality (a khutor) in Krasnyanskoye Rural Settlement, Kumylzhensky District, Volgograd Oblast, Russia. The population was 148 as of 2010. There are 3 streets.

== Geography ==
Tochilkin is located in forest steppe, on Khopyorsko-Buzulukskaya Plain, 44 km southeast of Kumylzhenskaya (the district's administrative centre) by road. Chiganaki 2-ye is the nearest rural locality.
