= Zatalovsky =

Zatalovsky Заталовский
- Khutor
- Location within Volgograd Oblast Location within Russia
- Coordinates: 49°39′N 42°16′E
- Country: Russia
- Region: Volgograd Oblast
- District: Kumylzhensky District
- Time zone: UTC+4:00

Zatalovsky (Russian: Заталовский) is a rural locality (a khutor) in Bukanovskoye Rural Settlement, Kumylzhensky District, Volgograd Oblast, Russia. The population was 59 as of 2010.

== Geography ==
Zatalovsky is located in forest steppe, on Khopyorsko-Buzulukskaya Plain, on the right bank of the Khopyor River, 42 km southwest of Kumylzhenskaya (the district's administrative centre) by road. Bukanovskaya is the nearest rural locality.
