= Firsovka =

Firsovka Фирсовка
- Khutor
- Location within Volgograd Oblast Location within Russia
- Coordinates: 48°05′N 42°15′E
- Country: Russia
- Region: Volgograd Oblast
- District: Chernyshkovsky District
- Time zone: UTC+4:00

Firsovka (Russian: Фирсовка) is a rural locality (a khutor) in Nizhnegnutovskoye Rural Settlement, Chernyshkovsky District, Volgograd Oblast, Russia. The population was 142 as of 2010. There are 2 streets.

== Geography ==
Firsovka is located on the right bank of the Tsimla River, 41 km south of Chernyshkovsky (the district's administrative centre) by road. Sizov is the nearest rural locality.
