= Belenky =

Belenky, feminine: Belenkaya (Russian: Беленький, Беленькая) is a Russian surname, typically of people of Jewish origin. In 1972 it was the 14th most common Jewish surname in Moscow and the 16th in Leningrad.

The surname may refer to:

- Abram Belenky, Soviet secret service (Cheka/GPU/NKVD) leader
- Roman Belenky, former member of Motorama (band)
- Valery Belenky, Soviet Azerbaijani/German artistic gymnast
- Dina Belenkaya, Russian chess player
- Maya Belenkaya, Soviet figure skater

== See also ==
- Belenkaya, volcano
- Belenky, Amur Oblast
- Belenky, Volgograd Oblast
