= Popov, Chernyshkovsky District, Volgograd Oblast =

Popov Попов
- Khutor
- Location within Volgograd Oblast Location within Russia
- Coordinates: 48°10′N 42°51′E
- Country: Russia
- Region: Volgograd Oblast
- District: Chernyshkovsky District
- Time zone: UTC+4:00

Popov (Russian: Попов) is a rural locality (a khutor) in Zakharovskoye Rural Settlement, Chernyshkovsky District, Volgograd Oblast, Russia. The population was 318 as of 2010. There are 12 streets.

== Geography ==
Popov is located on the bank of the Tsimlyansk Reservoir, 60 km southeast of Chernyshkovsky (the district's administrative centre) by road. Vodyanovsky is the nearest rural locality.
