= Bukanovskoye Zagotzerno =

Bukanovskoye Zagotzerno Букановское Заготзерно
- Settlement
- Location within Volgograd Oblast Location within Russia
- Coordinates: 49°36′N 42°16′E
- Country: Russia
- Region: Volgograd Oblast
- District: Kumylzhensky District
- Time zone: UTC+4:00

Bukanovskoye Zagotzerno (Russian: Букановское Заготзерно) is a rural locality (a settlement) in Bukanovskoye Rural Settlement, Kumylzhensky District, Volgograd Oblast, Russia. The population was 77 as of 2010.

== Geography ==
Bukanovskoye Zagotzerno is located in forest steppe, on Khopyorsko-Buzulukskaya Plain, 46 km southwest of Kumylzhenskaya (the district's administrative centre) by road. Zimovnoy is the nearest rural locality.
