= Sizov, Volgograd Oblast =

Sizov Сизов
- Khutor
- Location within Volgograd Oblast Location within Russia
- Coordinates: 48°08′N 42°17′E
- Country: Russia
- Region: Volgograd Oblast
- District: Chernyshkovsky District
- Time zone: UTC+4:00

Sizov (Russian: Сизов) is a rural locality (a khutor) in and the administrative center of Sizovskoye Rural Settlement, Chernyshkovsky District, Volgograd Oblast, Russia. The population was 498 as of 2010. There are 17 streets.

== Geography ==
Sizov is located on the bank of the Tsimla River, 33 km south of Chernyshkovsky (the district's administrative centre) by road. Basakin is the nearest rural locality.
