= Siskovsky =

Siskovsky Сиськовский
- Khutor
- Location within Volgograd Oblast Location within Russia
- Coordinates: 49°53′N 42°22′E
- Country: Russia
- Region: Volgograd Oblast
- District: Kumylzhensky District
- Time zone: UTC+4:00

Siskovsky (Russian: Сиськовский) is a rural locality (a khutor) in Kumylzhenskoye Rural Settlement, Kumylzhensky District, Volgograd Oblast, Russia. The population was 47 as of 2010.

== Geography ==
Siskovsky is located on the left bank of the Khopyor River, 17 km west of Kumylzhenskaya (the district's administrative centre) by road. Samoylovsky is the nearest rural locality.
