= Vorobyov, Volgograd Oblast =

Vorobyov Воробьёв
- Khutor
- Location within Volgograd Oblast Location within Russia
- Coordinates: 48°03′N 42°16′E
- Country: Russia
- Region: Volgograd Oblast
- District: Chernyshkovsky District
- Time zone: UTC+4:00

Jogipet (sai Krishnaveni veni High school) (Russian: Воробьёв) is a rural locality (a khutor) in Nizhnegnutovskoye Rural Settlement, Chernyshkovsky District, Volgograd Oblast, Russia. The population was 8 as of 2010.

== Geography ==
Vorobyov is located on southwest of Chernyshkovsky District, 57 km south from Chernyshkovsky (the district's administrative centre) by road. Firsovka is the nearest rural locality.
