= Kumylzhensky =

Kumylzhensky (masculine), Kumylzhenskaya (feminine), or Kumylzhenskoye (neuter) may refer to:

- Kumylzhensky District, a district of Volgograd Oblast, Russia
- Kumylzhenskaya, a rural locality (a stanitsa) in Kumylzhensky District of Volgograd Oblast, Russia
