= Gladkov, Volgograd Oblast =

Gladkov Гладков
- Settlement
- Location within Volgograd Oblast Location within Russia
- Coordinates: 48°14′N 42°10′E
- Country: Russia
- Region: Volgograd Oblast
- District: Chernyshkovsky District
- Time zone: UTC+4:00

Gladkov (Russian: Гладков) is a rural locality (a settlement) in Basakinskoye Rural Settlement, Chernyshkovsky District, Volgograd Oblast, Russia. The population was 41 as of 2010. There are 2 streets.

== Geography ==
Gladkov is located 29 km southwest of Chernyshkovsky (the district's administrative centre) by road. Verkhnegnutov is the nearest rural locality.
