= Filatov, Volgograd Oblast =

Filatov Филатов
- Khutor
- Location within Volgograd Oblast Location within Russia
- Coordinates: 48°10′N 42°17′E
- Country: Russia
- Region: Volgograd Oblast
- District: Chernyshkovsky District
- Time zone: UTC+4:00

Filatov (Russian: Филатов) is a rural locality (a khutor) in Sizovskoye Rural Settlement, Chernyshkovsky District, Volgograd Oblast, Russia. The population was 174 as of 2010. There are 6 streets.

== Geography ==
Filatov is located on the right bank of the Tsimla River, 30 km south of Chernyshkovsky (the district's administrative centre) by road. Basakin is the nearest rural locality.
