= Grishinsky =

Grishinsky Гришинский
- Khutor
- Location within Volgograd Oblast Location within Russia
- Coordinates: 50°00′N 42°28′E
- Country: Russia
- Region: Volgograd Oblast
- District: Kumylzhensky District
- Time zone: UTC+4:00

Grishinsky (Russian: Гришинский) is a rural locality (a khutor) in Sulyayevskoye Rural Settlement, Kumylzhensky District, Volgograd Oblast, Russia. The population was 143 as of 2010.

== Geography ==
Grishinsky is located in forest steppe, on Khopyorsko-Buzulukskaya Plain, 30 km northwest of Kumylzhenskaya (the district's administrative centre) by road. Ilmenevsky is the nearest rural locality.
