= Kalinin, Volgograd Oblast =

Kalinin Калинин
- Khutor
- Location within Volgograd Oblast Location within Russia
- Coordinates: 49°51′N 42°02′E
- Country: Russia
- Region: Volgograd Oblast
- District: Kumylzhensky District
- Time zone: UTC+4:00

Kalinin (Russian: Калинин) is a rural locality (a khutor) in Shakinskoye Rural Settlement, Kumylzhensky District, Volgograd Oblast, Russia. The population was 4 as of 2010.

== Geography ==
Kalinin is located in forest steppe, on Khopyorsko-Buzulukskaya Plain, on the bank of the Srednyaya Yelan River, 47 km west of Kumylzhenskaya (the district's administrative centre) by road. Krasnopolov is the nearest rural locality.
