= Sarychevsky =

Sarychevsky Сарычевский
- Khutor
- Location within Volgograd Oblast Location within Russia
- Coordinates: 49°56′N 42°22′E
- Country: Russia
- Region: Volgograd Oblast
- District: Kumylzhensky District
- Time zone: UTC+4:00

Sarychevsky (Russian: Сарычевский) is a rural locality (a khutor) in Kumylzhenskoye Rural Settlement, Kumylzhensky District, Volgograd Oblast, Russia. The population was 127 as of 2010. There are 2 streets.

== Geography ==
Sarychevsky is located in forest steppe, on Khopyorsko-Buzulukskaya Plain, on the bank of the Stary Khopyor River, 25 km northwest of Kumylzhenskaya (the district's administrative centre) by road. Kuchurovsky is the nearest rural locality.
