= Lyalinsky =

Lyalinsky Лялинский
- Khutor
- Location within Volgograd Oblast Location within Russia
- Coordinates: 49°57′N 42°35′E
- Country: Russia
- Region: Volgograd Oblast
- District: Kumylzhensky District
- Time zone: UTC+4:00

Lyalinsky (Russian: Лялинский) is a rural locality (a khutor) in Sulyayevskoye Rural Settlement, Kumylzhensky District, Volgograd Oblast, Russia. The population was 7 as of 2010.

== Geography ==
Lyalinsky is located in forest steppe, on Khopyorsko-Buzulukskaya Plain, on the bank of the Kumylga River, 13 km north of Kumylzhenskaya (the district's administrative centre) by road. Kraptsovsky is the nearest rural locality.
