= Biryukov, Volgograd Oblast =

Biryukov Бирюков
- Khutor
- Location within Volgograd Oblast Location within Russia
- Coordinates: 48°12′N 42°15′E
- Country: Russia
- Region: Volgograd Oblast
- District: Chernyshkovsky District
- Time zone: UTC+4:00

Biryukov (Russian: Бирюков) is a rural locality (a khutor) in Verkhnegnutovskoye Rural Settlement, Chernyshkovsky District, Volgograd Oblast, Russia. The population was 35 as of 2010.

== Geography ==
Biryukov is located 26 km south of Chernyshkovsky (the district's administrative centre) by road. Verkhnegnutov is the nearest rural locality.
