= Tsimla =

Coordinates: 48°01′N 42°23′E

Physical characteristics
- Length: 186 km

Basin features
- Population: 1650 sq.km.

The Tsimla (Russian: Цимла́) or Tsymlya (Цымля) is a river in southern European Russia and a right-bank tributary of the Don; it flows into the Tsimlyansk Reservoir, which takes its name from the river itself. It flows through the Rostov and Volgograd Oblast.

== Description ==
The river originates in the eastern part of the Don-Donets Plain, in the Milyutinsky District. In its upper reaches, it passes through the urban-type settlement of Chernyshkovsky. It has a length of 186 km and a drainage basin of 1,650 km². It flows into the Tsimlyansk Reservoir near Nizhnegnutov, 349 km from the mouth of the Don, forming a wide inlet.
