= Yendovsky, Kumylzhensky District, Volgograd Oblast =

Yendovsky Ендовский
- Khutor
- Location within Volgograd Oblast Location within Russia
- Coordinates: 50°05′N 42°25′E
- Country: Russia
- Region: Volgograd Oblast
- District: Kumylzhensky District
- Time zone: UTC+4:00

Yendovsky (Russian: Ендовский) is a rural locality (a khutor) in Sulyayevskoye Rural Settlement, Kumylzhensky District, Volgograd Oblast, Russia. The population was 106 as of 2010.

== Geography ==
Yendovsky is located on Khopyorsko-Buzulukskaya Plain, on the bank of the Khopyor River, 40 km northwest of Kumylzhenskaya (the district's administrative centre) by road. Pokruchinsky is the nearest rural locality.
