= Baznoy =

Baznoy Базной
- Khutor
- Location within Volgograd Oblast Location within Russia
- Coordinates: 48°11′N 42°10′E
- Country: Russia
- Region: Volgograd Oblast
- District: Chernyshkovsky District
- Time zone: UTC+4:00

Baznoy (Russian: Базной) is a rural locality (a khutor) in Basakinskoye Rural Settlement, Chernyshkovsky District, Volgograd Oblast, Russia. The population was 109 as of 2010. There are 4 streets.

== Geography ==
Baznoy is located on Don Plain, on south-west of Volgograd Oblast, 32 km south of Chernyshkovsky (the district's administrative centre) by road. Verkhnegnutov is the nearest rural locality.
