= 197th Rifle Division =

197th Rifle Division (March 14, 1941 - September 19, 1941) 197th Rifle Division (July 12, 1942 - January 3, 1943) 197th Rifle Division (May 16, 1943 - July 1945)
- Active: 1941–1945
- Country: Soviet Union
- Branch: Red Army
- Type: Infantry
- Size: Division
- Engagements: World War II; Operation Barbarossa; Battle of Uman; Battle of Stalingrad; Operation Little Saturn; Operation Kutuzov; Bryansk operation; Gomel-Rechitsa offensive; Parichi-Bobruisk Offensive; Lvov–Sandomierz offensive; Vistula–Oder offensive; Lower Silesian offensive; Battle of Berlin; Battle of Halbe; Prague offensive
- Decorations: Order of the Red Banner; Order of Kutuzov (both 3rd formation)
- Battle honours: Bryansk (3rd formation)

Commanders
- Notable commanders: Col. Stepan Dmitrievich Gubin; Maj. Gen. Mikhail Ivanovich Zaporozhchenko; Col. Boris Nikolaevich Popov; Maj. Gen. Fyodor Semyonovich Danilovskii; Col. Fyodor Fyodorovich Abashev

The 197th Rifle Division was an infantry division of the Red Army, originally formed as part of the prewar buildup of forces, based on the shtat (table of organization and equipment) of September 13, 1939. It began forming just months before the German invasion in the Kiev Special Military District, where it was soon assigned to the 49th Rifle Corps in the reserves of Southwestern Front. At the start of Operation Barbarossa it was in western Ukraine and quickly came under intense pressure from the 1st Panzer Group which split the Corps apart. Forced to the south and east it was assigned to 6th Army and in early August was encircled and destroyed near Uman.

A new 197th began forming in March 1942 in the North Caucasus Military District. During the crisis caused by the German summer offensive it was assigned to 63rd Army in Stalingrad Front in mid-July. As German Army Group B pressed toward Stalingrad in August the Front was ordered to conduct several diversionary attacks across the Don River. One of these, by 63rd Army against elements of Italian 8th Army, carved out a substantial bridgehead west of Serafimovich, which would serve as a springboard for the Soviet counteroffensive in November. When this began the 197th was still in the western corner of the bridgehead, now part of the 1st Guards Army of Southwestern Front. It was not part of the Front's shock group and played a supporting role in the offensive, making little progress against the Romanian forces that were now containing the bridgehead. 1st Guards was being held back for Operation Saturn, but before this began on December 16 it had been renamed Little Saturn and the over-large Army had been split, with the division becoming part of the new 3rd Guards Army. This Army's main objective was to encircle and destroy the two divisions of Army Group Hollidt and the remainder of Romanian 3rd Army. Over the next two weeks this was largely successful, and on January 3, 1943, the division was redesignated as the 59th Guards Rifle Division.

The third 197th was formed from a pair of rifle brigades in the Moscow Military District in May 1943. It was soon assigned to 11th Army in Bryansk Front in time to take part in the Soviet summer counteroffensive following the Battle of Kursk. As it advanced it soon earned a battle honor. It was soon also awarded the Order of the Red Banner. In November it played a secondary role in the fighting for the city of Gomel, and remained involved in Belorussian Front's (later 1st Belorussian) grinding winter battles in eastern Belarus as part of 48th Army. At the start of March, 1944 it was removed to the Reserve of the Supreme High Command for rebuilding and was also redeployed to the south, joining the 3rd Guards Army in 1st Ukrainian Front, where it would remain for the duration. During the Lvov–Sandomierz Offensive the 197th played a key role in the taking of Volodymyr-Volynskyi and three of its regiments received its name as an honorific. It helped to create the bridgehead over the Vistula near Sandomierz in August before pausing until the winter campaign. During the Lower Silesian Offensive in February 1945 it was involved in battles along the Oder River in the Glogau area, before advancing to the Neisse River. During the Berlin Offensive in April the 197th was part of the forces that encircled and destroyed the German 9th Army, for which it was awarded the Order of Kutuzov, 2nd Degree, and several of its subunits received decorations for their parts in the capture of Dresden. It ended the war advancing toward Prague, but despite a distinguished combat record it was disbanded in July.

== 1st Formation ==
The division officially formed from March 14 to April 15, 1941, in the Kiev Special Military District. As of June 22, 1941 it had the following order of battle:

- 828th Rifle Regiment
- 862nd Rifle Regiment
- 889th Rifle Regiment
- 261st Artillery Regiment
- 362nd Howitzer Artillery Regiment
- 19th Antitank Battalion
- 62nd Antiaircraft Battalion
- 255th Reconnaissance Battalion
- 261st Sapper Battalion
- 617th Signal Battalion
- 124th Medical/Sanitation Battalion
- 160th Degassing Platoon
- 17th Motor Transport Battalion
- 309th Motorized Field Bakery
- 717th Field Postal Station
- 542nd Field Office of the State Bank

Col. Stepan Dmitrievich Gubin was appointed to command the division on the day it began forming, and would remain in this position for the duration of the 1st formation. When the German invasion began the division was still a long way from being complete, but was in the reserves of Southwestern Front (the renamed Kiev District) as part of the 49th Rifle Corps, which also included the 190th and 199th Rifle Divisions. By nightfall on June 23 the division was concentrated at Yabluniv and was preparing for combat.

== Battle of Uman ==
By the end of July 7 the 197th and 190th Divisions were attempting to hold against the German IV Army Corps northeast of Volochysk, but the 199th had been separated from the 49th Corps by a thrust of XIV Motorized Corps. By July 10 the 49th Corps had been subordinated to 6th Army, still in Southwestern Front.

As of July 15 the division had been worn down to a strength of just 1,485 personnel and nine artillery pieces. By the end of the previous day the 197th and 190th had fallen back to positions southwest of Berdychiv, forming the right flank of 6th Army, but without much at all in support to the east. As of July 23, while the German encircling operation was commencing, the two divisions were in the vicinity of Orativ. Within days, 6th Army was hopelessly cut off from Southwestern Front and was transferred to Southern Front. This made little difference to the overall situation as in early August the Army was encircled at Uman. The 197th was one of the first units hit by the encircling forces; it was overrun and destroyed on August 6, although it was not officially written off until September 19. Colonel Gubin was killed in a breakout attempt; roughly 700 men and 45 vehicles were able to escape.

== 2nd Formation ==
A new 197th Rifle Division started forming on March 6, 1942, at Krasnodar in the North Caucasus Military District. Once formed its order of battle would be quite similar to that of the 1st formation:

- 828th Rifle Regiment
- 862nd Rifle Regiment
- 889th Rifle Regiment
- 261st Artillery Regiment
- 418th Antitank Battalion
- 472nd Motorized Antiaircraft Battery
- 255th Reconnaissance Company
- 261st Sapper Battalion
- 617th Signal Battalion
- 124th Medical/Sanitation Battalion
- 160th Chemical Defense (Anti-gas) Company
- 538th Motor Transport Company
- 381st Field Bakery
- 851st Divisional Veterinary Hospital
- 1965th Field Postal Station (later 1840th)
- 1159th Field Office of the State Bank

Col. Mikhail Ivanovich Zaporozhchenko was appointed to command on the day the division began forming. He had been arrested and imprisoned for over a year during the Great Purge, and came to the 197th after serving as the second commander of the 409th Rifle Division. He would be promoted to the rank of major general on October 14 and remained in command of the 2nd formation for its entire existence.

== Battle of Stalingrad ==
As of the beginning of May the division had been assigned to 5th Reserve Army, along with the 153rd Rifle Division. By the start of the German summer offensive (on the southern sector July 7) this formation had been reinforced with four more divisions. On July 12, as the situation deteriorated, the STAVKA ordered that Southwestern Front be redesignated as Stalingrad Front, to consist of four armies, with the 5th Reserve redesignated as 63rd Army. According to the order:

4. The mission of Stalingrad Front is to occupy the Stalingrad line west of the Don River firmly... Defend the eastern bank of the Don River with 63rd Army in the sector it occupies and prevent the enemy from forcing the Don River under any circumstances.

The Army, under command of Lt. Gen. V. I. Kuznetsov, now had five divisions under command, including the 197th. Kuznetsov was to link his left flank to the 21st Army in the area of Serafimovich. It remained in this general situation at the start of August.

=== Serafimovich Bridgehead ===
As the German 6th Army prepared to drive from the Don to Stalingrad the commander of Stalingrad Front, Col. Gen. A. I. Yeryomenko, issued orders on August 18/19 for a series of coordinated counterattacks by his armies to tie down German forces. 63rd Army was directed to advance from a 15km-wide sector west of the Khopyor River southwards across the Don towards Chebotarevskii, Klinovoi and Perelazovskii with the 197th and 14th Guards Rifle Divisions with an immediate objective 15-20km south of the river. The attack began at dawn on August 20 and faced the Italian 2nd Infantry Division of 8th Army's XXXV Corps, which had only moved into the sector four days earlier. It gained immediate success and soon held a bridgehead 2-3km deep:

197th RD was fighting along the line 3 kilometres south of Rubezhinskii-Pleshakovskii-Verkhnyi Matveevskii [on the river's southern bank] with its forward units at 1100 hours on 20 August. The main forces of the division were continuing to cross the Don River.

Continuing their advance over the next two days the two attacking divisions were soon reinforced by 203rd Rifle Division and 21st Army's 304th Rifle Division. By then they had expanded their bridgehead to a depth of 2-10km, with the 197th on the right (west) flank approaching the village of Yagodnyi. By the time the attack wound down on August 28 the combined Soviet assault force had carved a bridgehead 50km wide and up to 25km deep on the south bank of the Don.

The situation in the bridgehead remained much the same until November 1 when the STAVKA issued a directive redesignating 63rd Army as the second formation of 1st Guards Army, effective November 5. The Army was now in Southwestern Front, with Lt. Gen. D. D. Lelyushenko in command. The 197th, 153rd, and 1st Rifle Divisions were combined into the new 14th Rifle Corps, effective November 10.

== Operation Uranus ==
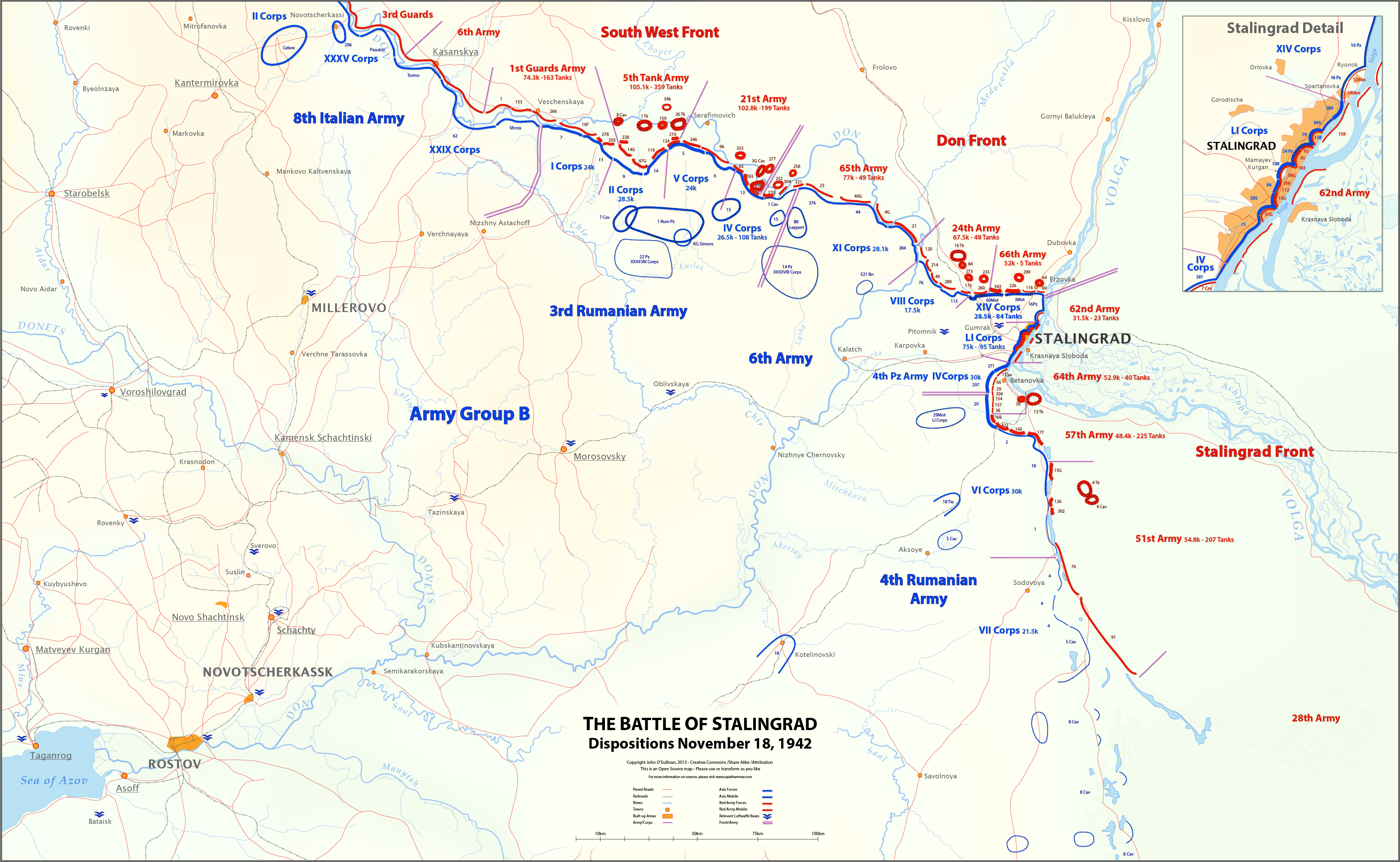
Preparations for Operation Uranus. Note position of the 197th Rifle Division.

In the buildup to the Soviet counteroffensive most of 1st Guards Army had left the bridgehead and redeployed westward, being replaced by 5th Tank Army. In the plan for the operation this Army, and the 21st Army to its east, would form the main shock group of Southwestern Front while 1st Guards played a supporting role. In the event that Uranus was successful it would play a significant role in the far more ambitious Operation Saturn. It was stronger in manpower than the other two Armies in part due to its divisions not having seen significant combat since July, and in part due to an influx of rebuilt divisions from the Reserve of the Supreme High Command. On November 20 it had 142,869 personnel in combat formations, supported by 3,308 guns and mortars and 163 tanks.

Most of these forces would remain on the defense during the first part of the offensive, but its supporting attack would take place within the bridgehead on a 10km-wide sector from Yagodnyi to Farm No. 4 on the right flank of 5th Tanks. It would be conducted by the 203rd and 278th Rifle Divisions, plus one regiment of the 197th, supported by three regiments of reserve artillery. The Axis lines facing the bridgehead were now held by Romanian 3rd Army. The objectives were to penetrate the Romanian tactical defenses, destroy the Romanian forces in the sector, exploit southward to reach positions form east of Belogorka southward to Vislogubov and Bokovskaya by the end of the second day, and then dig in to protect the main shock group from attacks from the west. The 197th was largely facing the Romanian 7th Infantry Division.

At 0730 hours on November 19, Southwestern Front began its 80-minute artillery preparation along its penetration sectors. Although much of this fire was frightening and destructive to the defenders, poor visibility caused by snow and fog limited visibility. The same conditions prevented air support. Even before the bombardment was completed the infantry assault began. In the first hour 5th Tank Army's four rifle divisions overcame 3rd Army's first defensive positions with relative ease. By the end of November 20, 5th Tanks had penetrated as far south as Perelazovsky. However, 1st Guards' supporting attack on the 19th had been a failure. 5th Tank's 14th Guards Division had stalled in front of the defenses of Romanian 9th Infantry Division, and an effort by 203rd Division to assist ran into determined resistance from 11th Infantry Division. As a result, Lelyushenko declined to attack on November 20, instead waiting for 5th Tanks' advance to force the Romanians to fall back; he had been directed to conserve his forces for Operation Saturn.

On November 22 the 203rd and 278th Divisions, in conjunction with 14th Guards (which was slated to be transferred to 1st Guards Army the next day), exploited the advance of the right flank of 5th Tank Army, attacking and penetrating the defenses of the Romanian 9th and 11th Divisions, drove westward, and captured a number of villages, including Yagodnyi. Meanwhile, the main body of the 197th remained waiting in the wings for its role in Saturn.

The encirclement of 6th Army was effective on November 23. On this day and the next, Lelyushenko's forces continued a "little war" against Romanian and German forces defending the salient that formed a right angle between the Don and Krivaya Rivers. The main attack were intended to collapse the defenses of Romanian 7th and 11th Divisions on the northern and eastern flanks of the salient. By doing so they also threatened the right flank of Italian 8th Army, which was defending the Don River front farther to the northwest. By the morning of November 25 the 14th Guards, 203rd, and 266th Rifle Divisions had formed a bridgehead west of the Krivaya which came under a pincer attack by Attack Group Hollidt, based on the German XVII Army Corps. This proved successful in collapsing the bridgehead and causing significant casualties.

At this point, the fate of Operation Saturn remained unresolved. In order to increase the effectiveness of command and control in Southwestern Front the STAVKA representative, Lt. Gen. A. M. Vasilevskii, proposed subdividing 1st Guards Army into two separate armies. The operational group along the Krivaya and Chir Rivers, including the 197th, would become the new 3rd Guards Army, under command of Lelyushenko. The primary objective of Saturn was to destroy Italian 8th Army and Army Group Hollidt. 1st and 3rd Guards Armies would launch concentric attacks and link up in the Millerovo area; subsequently the mobile corps subordinate to both Armies would exploit to the Likhaya region to create conditions for an even deeper exploitation by 2nd Guards Army to capture the Rostov region. Plans for conducting the offensive remained on track during the first few days of December.

== Operation Little Saturn ==
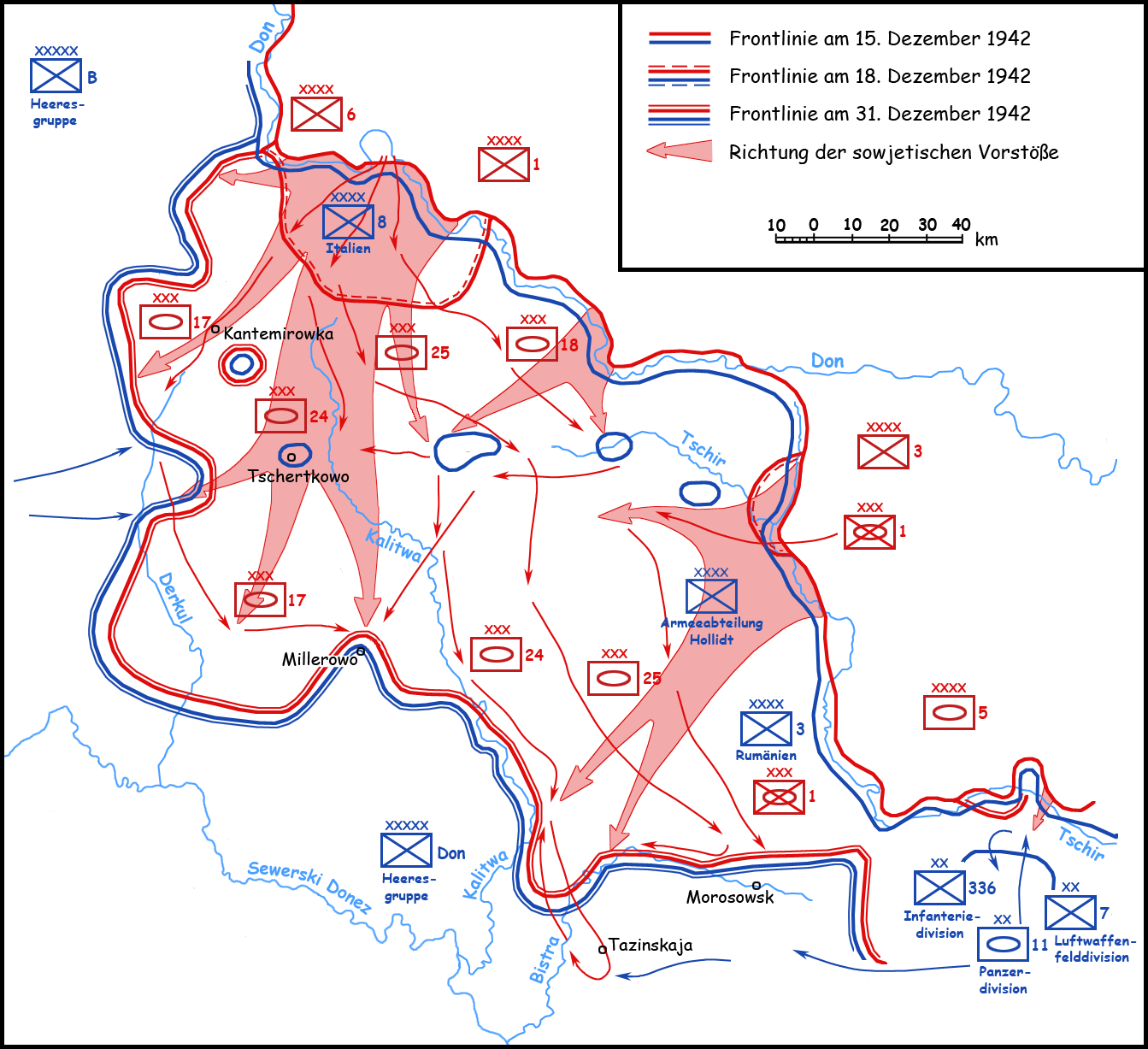
Operation Little Saturn. Note position of 3rd Guards Army, marked "3".

It soon became apparent that the 4th Panzer Army was gathering forces south and southwest of Stalingrad in an effort to relieve the trapped 6th Army. Under the circumstances it was necessary to divert the 2nd Guards Army to meet this threat, and Saturn was modified to Little Saturn, abandoning the Rostov objective, as least in the near-term. Days before the attack started, on December 10, the 197th's strength was recorded as 9,177 officers and other ranks, equipped with 6,155 rifles and carbines, 687 submachine guns, 104 light machine guns, 79 heavy machine guns, 183 mortars of all calibres, 48 76mm cannons and guns, and 29 45mm antitank guns. The replacement of the authorized 122mm howitzers in the 261st Artillery Regiment by an extra battalion of 76mm cannon was typical of the rifle units of Southwestern Front, probably reflecting production shortages of the former. Given its strength and relative experience the division was designated as an assault division for the offensive.

This began at 0800 hours on December 16 with the fire from more than 5,000 guns and mortars. The KV tanks of several Guards heavy tank regiments had failed to arrive by the start of the operation, so the artillery had to blast passages in the barbed wire obstacles along a number of sectors. Along 3rd Guards Army's breakthrough sector the Axis artillery had been suppressed by long-range fire. However, as with Uranus, limited visibility hampered observation. In an after-action report it was noted:

3. During the operation a major role was played by guns firing over open sights, both during the artillery preparation and during the subsequent periods of the fighting. For example, up to 170 guns firing over open sights took part along the breakthrough sectors of 14th Guards (sic) Rifle Corps and the 197th Rifle Division. These guns moved in two echelons, as infantry accompaniment guns.

Despite this effective support the defense was not broken through on the first day.

Nevertheless, by the end of the day the 197th had completely cleared Verkhnii Kalininskii and had consolidated along the northern slopes of heights 204.2 and 215.9 and along the southern outskirts on the village. Overnight, Lelyushenko demanded that his troops take into the first-day mistakes and attack on December 17 with the previous day's missions. Thirty minutes, from 0745 to 0815, were to be allotted to the artillery preparation. As had happened the previous day, the German 294th and 62nd Infantry Divisions managed to stall the divisions of 14th Corps, at least until midday. Therefore, Lelyushenko decided, without waiting for the rifle divisions to break through the front, to commit his 1st Guards Mechanized Corps at 1300 hours to force the issue and develop success to the northwest. A vigorous tank attack threw the German forces out of their strongpoints, after which the advance became much more rapid. However, the 197th's position on the flank remained unchanged.

During December 18 the last fortified line in the Axis defensive zone was broken as 1st Guards Mechanized and 266th Rifle Division occupied a series of villages without encountering serious resistance. 3rd Guards Army now began a pursuit of the two German divisions and the Romanian 7th and 11th Divisions with the objective of completing their encirclement and destruction in the Kruzhilin area. During these first three days, Southwestern Front killed up to 17,000 German, Italian, and Romanian personnel and captured more than 4,000, along with a large amount of materiel. On December 19, the 197th, which was attacking toward Kruzhilin from the north, met the 14th Rifle and 1st Guards Mechanized advancing from the south. Thus, by the end of the operation's fourth day the 3rd Guards had completed its immediate task. During the previous day and overnight a significant portion of the Axis forces managed to pull out of the pocket and consolidate with rearguards along the south bank of the Chir.

The Front commander, Col. Gen. N. F. Vatutin, now ordered Lelyushenko to immediately turn his Army's forces to the south and organize an unremitting pursuit. Simultaneously with this, the Army was required to immediately reach the Morozovskii area, primarily with mobile forces, and, in conjunction with two tank corps, launch an attack into the rear of the German forces in the Tormosin area. Overnight on December 19/20 the 1st Guards Mechanized cut off and destroyed over 10,000 Axis troops falling back from Kruzhilin. This allowed the Army's right flank rifle divisions to advance rapidly to the area of Red Dawn State Farm–Ponomarev. On December 21 and the following days the offensive along the Army's right flank and center more successfully than on the left. A favorable situation was developing for launching an attack against the rear of the Axis Chernyshevskaya grouping.

By December 24 this had become apparent to the Axis command, which hurriedly began to pull back from this sector. The pursuit phase of the operation generally ended by December 25-27 as the Axis forces, with the assistance of arriving reserves, had managed to consolidate along the heights on the northern bank of the Bystraya River. Despite this temporary halt, the Tormosin area had by now been so deeply outflanked by Southwestern and Stalingrad Fronts that it also had to be evacuated, eliminating any further possibility of relieving German 6th Army. By December 28 the 197th and 278th Divisions were established along the Kalitva River along the sector Nikolskaya–Ilinka where they organized a defense and carried out reconnaissance to the west and southwest, rounding up groups and detachments of Axis soldiers wandering in the rear.Some of these detachments numbered up to 4,000 men, with artillery and tanks, and put up varying degrees of resistance. On January 3, 1943, the 197th was recognized for its accomplishments in this victory when it was redesignated as the 59th Guards Rifle Division.

General Zaporozhchenko remained with the division only briefly before becoming commander of 18th Rifle Corps, then deputy commander of 3rd Guards Army, and then taking over 4th Guards Rifle Corps. After being hospitalized from November 1943 to February 1944, he ended the war in command of 11th Rifle Corps, being promoted to the rank of lieutenant general in April 1945. He retired in 1949 and died on May 20, 1970.

== 3rd Formation ==
The last 197th Rifle Division formed from May 8-16 in the Tula Oblast of the Moscow Military District, based on a pair of rifle brigades.

=== 120th Rifle Brigade ===
The 2nd formation of the 120th was formed starting in January 1943 in the Volga Military District, but it may never have been completely formed as a brigade. In early May the forces that had been assembled were moved by rail to Tula and used to form part of the 197th.

=== 147th Rifle Brigade ===
This began as a kursant (student) brigade, based on military students and training units in the Siberian Military District from December 1941 to March 1942. Like many other brigades from this district it went through the Reserve of the Supreme High Command in March-April and on to Northwestern Front. There the brigade was assigned to 34th Army near the Demyansk salient until October, when it was transferred to 27th Army in the Staraya Russa area. It remained with 27th Army until February 1943 when it returned to 34th Army during the German evacuation of the salient. At the end of the month it was again moved, now to 11th Army of the same Front, along the Lovat River line. In April the 147th was assigned to the Front's newly-formed 68th Army, but was soon disbanded to help form the 197th.

Once formed the division's order of battle would again be very similar to that of the previous formations:

- 828th Rifle Regiment
- 862nd Rifle Regiment
- 889th Rifle Regiment
- 261st Artillery Regiment
- 418th Antitank Battalion
- 255th Reconnaissance Company
- 261st Sapper Battalion
- 617th Signal Battalion (later 230th Signal Company)
- 124th Medical/Sanitation Battalion
- 160th Chemical Defense (Anti-gas) Company
- 538th Motor Transport Company
- 381st Field Bakery
- 851st Divisional Veterinary Hospital
- 1792nd Field Postal Station
- 1749th Field Office of the State Bank

Col. Boris Nikolaevich Popov was appointed to command on May 16. The division was under command of 11th Army in the Reserve of the Supreme High Command and in June it was assigned to 53rd Rifle Corps; this Army had been redeployed southward following the Demyansk battles. In July the Army was assigned to Bryansk Front, and the 197th became part of the active army on July 12.

=== Operation Kutuzov ===
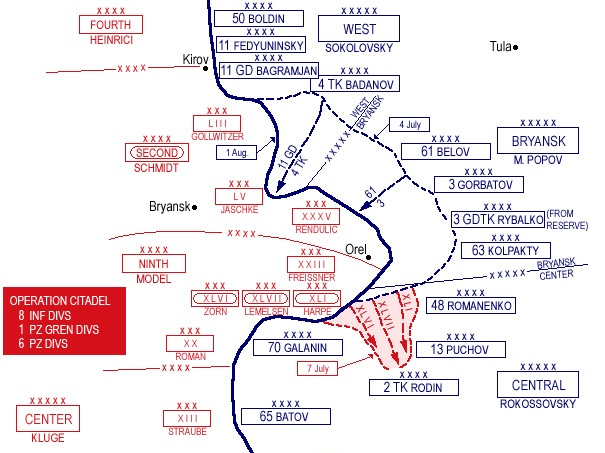
Map of Operation Kutuzov. Note position of 11th Army.

This operation began on the same date, but 11th Army was still far to the rear. On July 14 it came under command of Lt. Gen. I. I. Fedyuninskii. In six days the Army mostly completed a 160km approach march, until by 1100 hours on July 20 its lead elements took up a jumping-off position from Chishche to Moilovo, then southeast along the Resseta River to the crossing at Ktsyn. It was to be committed from the march on the right flank of 11th Guards Army in order to cover that flank and reduce its front. In fact only four of the Army's eight divisions reached this line, with the remainder, including the 197th, trailing behind, Due to a shortage of transport its artillery was carrying less than 0.7 of a combat load of ammunition. The infantry was worn out by a lengthy march along bad roads washed out by rain. The artillery became stretched out and the support elements fell behind. There was no time for carrying out additional reconnaissance, registering artillery, putting units in order, or bring up stragglers.

Fedyuninskii decided to launch his main attack in the direction of Brusny and Khvastovichi with four divisions (260th, 273rd, 135th and 369th) in first echelon and three (4th, 96th, and 197th) in second echelon. The 323rd Rifle Division was left in Army reserve. The artillery in support had a density of no more than 63 tubes per kilometre of front because so much of it was still on the move. The defenders consisted of the 134th, 211th, and 183rd Infantry Divisions and 5th Panzer Division, plus the 50th Independent Regiment.

Following a 30-minute artillery preparation the first echelon went over to the attack at 1230 hours. This proved largely ineffective, as the German forces occupied terrain favorable to the defense and stopped most of the infantry and tanks with powerful fire and counterattacks. The one exception was the 369th, on the Army's left flank adjacent to 11th Guards, which penetrated the wooded and swampy area southeast of Moilovo, forced the Resseta, and cut the road between Moilovo and Ktsyn. On July 21, units of the Army occupied Moilovo, and the next day Ktsyn. As a result of powerful and insistent counterattacks the German forces once again broke into the villages but failed to hold them for long. Moilovo was retaken the same day, and while Ktsyn held out longer, it was threatened with encirclement two days later. Fedyuninskii now concentrated the 197th and 323rd Divisions behind his left flank. These broke through the German defense with an attack on Kolodyatzsy, forcing the German grouping to fall back from the two villages. By the close of July 25 the Army reached a line north of Granki, Mekhovaya, Katunovka and Kharitonovka. On July 26 and 27 the German command committed fresh units of the 707th and 95th Infantry Divisions along this sector, as well as a number of independent units. The Army's further offensive halted and before July 30 it did not make any significant advance.

=== Capture of Karachev ===
In early August the 197th was transferred to the 25th Rifle Corps, still in 11th Army. On August 10, Colonel Popov left the division and was replaced by Lt. Col. Fyodor Fyodorovich Abashev. This officer had been deputy commander of the 120th Brigade and had been serving as the division's chief of staff. By August 12 the Army was closing in on the German stronghold of Karachev. At 0200 the reconnaissance battalions of the 25th and 46th Rifle Corps' divisions began their attack. The battalions broke through the forward screen and reached the forward edge of the defensive zone, and in places penetrated into the main zone of resistance. At noon the artillery opened up a powerful 30-minute bombardment, suppressing the German defense. Following this the main forces of the two Corps attacked against a stiff defense marked by heavy firepower and multiple counterattacks. By the end of August 14 the Soviet forces had completely broken through the defensive zone and reached the approaches to Karachev.

At 0300 hours on August 15 the immediate fighting for the town began. The Germans considered it significant as a road junction, supply base, and center of resistance and had concentrated units of the 78th and 34th Infantry Divisions, plus remnants of the 253rd and 293rd Infantry Divisions, 18th and 8th Panzer Divisions, and several other formations in its defense. The 238th and 369th Divisions outflanked the town from the northeast and north as the 197th, 323rd and 110th Rifle Divisions bypassed it from the same directions, creating a threat of encirclement. At the same time two divisions of the 11th Guards Army struck from the east and southeast. The German grouping was unable to withstand the concentric attack; the Red Army force broke into Karachev at 0830 hours and completely occupied it. German casualties were assessed at 4,000 killed and wounded, and the remainder fell back to west, covered by rearguards. As of August 18 the Army had reached the line Krasnoe–Zhurinichi–Velimya.

As the Bryansk Front continued to advance it approached its namesake city, which was liberated on September 17. The division received a battle honor:

BRYANSK... 197th Rifle Division (Lt. Colonel Abashev, Fyodor Fyodorovich)... The troops who participated in the battles during the crossing of the Desna and the liberation of Bryansk and Bezhitsa, by order of the Supreme High Command of 17 September 1943, and a commendation in Moscow, are given a salute of 12 artillery salvoes from 124 guns.

Two days later, Lt. Colonel Abashev returned to his chief of staff duties when Col. Fyodor Semyonovich Danilovskii took over command. He had previously been the deputy commander of the 387th Rifle Division, and then the chief of staff for rear services of 61st Army. On September 23, "for exemplary performance of combat missions", the division was awarded the Order of the Red Banner.

== Into Ukraine and Belarus ==
The 197th returned to 53rd Corps in the first days of October. On October 10, Bryansk Front was disbanded, and 11th Army was moved to Belorussian Front. Over the next four weeks this Front's forces advanced towards the Dniepr River, and by November 9 the 11th Army had reached the line of the Sozh just north of the city of Gomel. The Front commander, Army Gen. K. K. Rokossovskii, determined its next move would be to liberate that city and the nearby town of Rechitsa on the Dniepr. 11th Army was tasked with conducting the assault against Gomel proper. Fedyuninskii deployed his two rifle corps abreast on a 25km-wide sector from the village of Raduga, north of Gomel, to the railroad junction at Novo-Belitsa, southeast of the city. 53rd Corps was to deliver the main attack across the Sozh to encircle Gomel from the north with three rifle divisions in first echelon and the 197th in second.

[T]he army's military council... entrusted 53rd Rifle Corps with [the] mission... to smash the defending enemy in their strongpoints, reach the Gomel - Zhlobin highway and railroad line, and, by doing so, cut the enemy withdrawal routes to the northwest. Then, linking up with 25th Rifle Corps [it was to] encircle the city and destroy the enemy's Gomel grouping.

This was to prove a tall order.

=== Gomel-Rechitsa Offensive ===
The well-supported offensive began on November 12 and the Corps attacked German positions between Raduga and Kirpichni Factories but ran into very stiff resistance. The 323rd and 96th Divisions fought for three days to secure the village of Khalch, backed by the guns of 22nd Artillery Division. The village finally fell when the 217th Rifle Division forced its way across the Sozh south of the 96th. Khalch taken, the 217th, which had by now returned to 25th Corps, forced a crossing of the Sozh, and a general assault began on November 16. On the next day both the 96th and 323rd focused on seizing the village of Raduga, while the 217th headed for the eastern defenses of Gomel. The painful advance continued over the next several days, but German resistance finally began to flag by November 23 after the 217th captured Pokoliubichi, 8km northeast of the city's center. Soviet successes to the north and south, including the liberation of Rechitsa, forced German 9th Army to begin falling back to the Dniepr, and Gomel finally fell on November 26.

=== Parichi-Bobruisk Offensive ===
On December 1, Colonel Danilovskii left the division and handed command over to Lt. Col. Sergei Andreevich Vdovin. Danilovskii would return on February 2, 1944. Late in December, the 11th Army was disbanded, and the 197th, now back in 25th Corps, was transferred to 48th Army, still in Belorussian Front. In the first days of January 1944 it was located west of the Dniepr near the village of Zhdanova. With the fall of Gomel, Rokossovskii saw the next objectives of his center armies as Parichi and Babruysk to the northwest; the terrain along this route was excessively swampy but seen as easier to traverse in mid-winter. The commander of the Army, Lt. Gen. P. L. Romanenko, formed a shock group with his 42nd and 29th Rifle Corps with armor support and it was to launch its attack in the 15km-wide sector from Shatsilki on the Berezina southwest to Zherd Station on the Shatsilki-Kalinkavichy rail line, facing elements of XXXXI Panzer Corps. The 197th and 4th Divisions of 25th Corps were to remain on the defense in the extended sectors between the Berezina and Dniepr on the Army's left wing.

In the last few days of January, General Romanenko shuffled his Army's forces, transferring the headquarters of 25th Corps, along with the 197th, from the sector between the Berezina and Dniepr to the sector between Dubrova and Yazvin west of the Berezina. This sector had been occupied by one division of 65th Army and two divisions of 42nd Corps. This move concentrated the 42nd and 29th Corps for a renewal of the offensive on February 2. Romanenko designated the 25th and 53rd Corps as the Army's new shock group to assault the 36th and 134th Infantry Divisions northeast, west, and southwest of Dubrova, split the defending divisions and begin an exploitation toward the Parichi–Oktiabrskii road, 18km to the northwest.

After the shock group deployed in attack formation the 197th, 102nd, and 273rd Rifle Divisions were arrayed from left to right northeast of Dubrova, with 53rd Corps south and north of the same place. The 197th was specifically located west of Yazvin, facing part of the 110th Infantry Division, supported by part of an assault gun detachment. After conducting a reconnaissance-in-force on February 1 the shock groups began its main assault early the next day, preceded by an artillery preparation. The 96th Rifle Division captured Hill 142.7 after several hours of fighting and cleared Dubrova, but otherwise progress was minimal. Reinforcements from 36th Infantry Division halted 25th Corps in its tracks. By February 6 it was clear to Rokossovskii that heavy German resistance, plus the harsh weather and terrain conditions precluded further major offensive operations on this sector, and he ordered 48th Army over to the defense.

Beginning on February 24 the Front attempted to strike again in the direction of Parichi and Mormal. Over the next five days the 48th Army advanced 2-18km on a 20km front but was forced to a halt on the 29th. The 197th had left 25th Corps, was operating under direct Army control, and was probably not committed in this effort. By now, all the Front's forces were badly worn down from the winter campaign, and on March 1 the division was moved to the Reserve of the Supreme High Command for rebuilding and redeployment. By the start of April it had been assigned to 120th Rifle Corps in 3rd Guards Army. On April 18 this Army returned to the active front as part of 1st Ukrainian Front. The 197th would remain under this Army and Front for the duration of the war.

== Lvov–Sandomierz Offensive ==
In preparation for the summer offensive into Poland the 3rd Guards Army was positioned on the right (north) flank of 1st Ukrainian Front and 120th Corps was on the Army's right flank, facing positions of the XXXXII Army Corps west of Lutsk. 120th Corps had its 197th and 218th Rifle Divisions in first echelon with the 273rd Division in reserve. By July 10 the Front command had received information about possible German withdrawals from several vulnerable sectors prior to the main offensive. In response all first echelon divisions were to form reconnaissance detachments of reinforced rifle companies to begin combat operations at 2200 hours on July 12, continuing until 0100 hours on the 13th. The reconnaissance confirmed that the main German forces facing 3rd Guards and the right flank of 13th Army were pulling back under cover of rearguards. At 0300 the Army's forward battalions went over to the attack and during the day the 120th Corps advanced as much as 15km in an energetic pursuit supported by armor and air attacks. The assault continued at 0515 hours on July 14 following a 30-minute artillery preparation. The next day at 0800 hours the Army began to penetrate the second German defensive belt; 120th Corps was now encountering much stiffer resistance and had to beat off several counterattacks as it slowly moved forward. This line, anchored on the Luha River, was eventually forced and by the end of July 18 the Corps reached the city of Volodymyr-Volynskyi. The city was secured two days later and three subunits of the 197th received battle honors:

VLADIMIR-VOLINSKII... 828th Rifle Regiment (Lt. Colonel Danilenko, Zakhar Trofimovich)... 862nd Rifle Regiment (Major Kozhevnikov, Vasilii Antonovich)... 261st Artillery Regiment (Lt. Colonel Kosmachev, Mikhail Nikiforovich)... The troops who participated in the liberation of Vladimir-Volinskii, and Rava-Ruska, by the order of the Supreme High Command of 20 July 1944, and a commendation in Moscow, are given a salute of 20 artillery salvoes from 224 guns.

120th Corps reached the Polish border by the end of July 23 and captured Hrubieszów the following day as it pursued the defeated German forces toward the Vistula.

Cpl. Tulebai Khadzhibraevich Azhimov of the 862nd Rifle Regiment, a Kazakh by nationality, would be made a Hero of the Soviet Union on September 23. He first distinguished himself in the fighting for Krasnystaw on July 24; crossing the Wieprz River from the march he was one of the first Red Amy soldiers into the town. He accounted for 16 of the defenders, including a sniper, and was awarded the Order of Glory, 3rd Degree. By the end of the month the 3rd Guards Army was tasked with creating a bridgehead over the Vistula near Sandomierz. Overnight on July 31/August 1, Corporal Azhimov and his comrades began crossing. In the middle of the river German fire intensified and shell fragments pierced their inflatable boat. Azhimov swam to the west bank and entered the bridgehead battle. He was seriously wounded but, after bandaging himself, reentered the fighting. After being promoted to the rank of senior sergeant he was demobilized after the war. He lived in Almaty and served as chief of one of the city's fire departments for many years. He died on February 13, 1988, and was buried in the city's central cemetery. 3rd Guards Army would remain in the Sandomierz bridgehead into January, 1945. On September 13, Danilovskii was promoted to the rank of major general, and he took command of 120th Corps on September 30. Abashev, now promoted to colonel, again took command of the 197th, but he was replaced by Col. Ivan Georgievich Kantariya on January 2. This officer had previously led the 253rd Rifle Division.

== Into Poland and Germany ==
At the start of the Vistula-Oder Offensive the 120th Corps had the 197th, 149th and 106th Rifle Divisions under command. 3rd Guards Army was now under command of Col. Gen. V. N. Gordov. When the offensive began on January 12 the Corps was in the Army's first echelon. It remained in this position as the Army began approaching the Oder River on January 28; this river and the Silesian industrial area were the immediate objectives of the Front. By the end of January, the 3rd Guards Army had all three of its Corps deployed in a single echelon and was attacking along a sector 70km wide. The 21st and 120th Corps were overcoming the resistance of German 9th Army, which was falling back to the southwest under pressure of the 1st Belorussian Front. 120th Corps was now committed to encircle a German grouping in the area of Leszno in cooperation with 21st Rifle Corps. In the course of three days this grouping of 15,000 troops was defeated, with many forced to surrender. By this time most of the rifle divisions involved in the offensive averaged about 5,500 personnel each.

=== Lower Silesian Offensive ===
On January 31, the Front commander, Marshal I. S. Konev, ordered Gordov to continue an energetic offensive with 120th Corps and the 25th Tank Corps, and by the end of February 2 to reach the Oder along the sector Odereck–Glogau, where it was to establish tactical cooperation with units of 1st Belorussian Front. By that date the Corps reached the river along the Kleinitz–Lippen sector, but was unable to force a crossing. At this point, 3rd Guards Army was stretched across a frontage of 104km. By February 8 the 120th Corps had been deployed to cover 96km of this, along with the 127th Rifle Division of 21st Corps, while the remainder of that Corps and the 76th Corps were concentrated to conducted the next main attack.

During the first days of this assault the German 72nd Infantry Division continued to try to hold a bridgehead on the right bank of the Gross Land Canal, but during February 9-10 the 120th Corps crushed this resistance and reached the Oder along a front from Aufhalt to Rabsen. At the same time, the German forces continued to put up fierce resistance in an effort to hold the fortress area of Glogau and Breslau, often counterattacking and bringing up additional forces. While 120th Corps advanced north of Glogau, the remainder of 3rd Guards Army's shock force continued to roll up the German defense along the Oder, bypassing the Glogau area from the south. However, Konev continued to urge Gordov to speed up the defeat of the Glogau grouping and vigorously advance toward the Bóbr River. The next day Gordov began carrying out this assignment, and the fiercest fighting unfolded in the Glogau area. Despite desperate German efforts the 3rd Guards Army persistently threw them out of one inhabited locale after another and by the end of the day units of 21st Corps had outflanked the city from the north, east and south. A retreat route remained open, but was already threatened with being cut by the Army's left flank formations. It was clear that the garrison at Glogau was not preparing to abandon the place and was trying to distract to itself as many Soviet troops as possible.

Insofar as Glogau was heavily fortified the battle for its capture might have stretched out for a long time and tied down significant forces. Thus the decision was made to encircle it and leave behind the 329th Rifle Division to blockade the fortress while the remaining forces of the Army's shock group continued the offensive; the 197th took its place in 21st Corps. This Corps, with the 25th Tanks, completed cutting off the Glogau garrison before continuing to advance westward to roll up the defense along the Oder beginning on February 12.

Following the defeat and encirclement of XXIV Panzer Corps in the Glogau area the pace of 3rd Guards Army's advance began to increase rapidly because the Corps' remnants began falling back hurriedly, putting up little resistance. By February 15 the entire bend of the Oder had been cleared of German forces, and 3rd Guards, having captured the towns of Grossen and Naumburg, had reached the Bóbr from its mouth to Naumburg. The arrival of the Army at the Bóbr significantly improved the situation along the right flank of the Front's main shock group. The width of the Army's attack front shrank from 104km to 36km.

By February 16 the line of the Bóbr and Kweis rivers was being defended by three corps of 4th Panzer Army. XXXX Panzer Corps faced the 3rd Guards Army. According to Konev's plan for the next phase of the offensive the Front's main group of forces, including 3rd Guards, was to reach the Neisse River, capture bridgeheads on the west bank, and securely consolidate along the line reached. 21st Corps had secured a small bridgehead over the Bóbr on the night of February 15/16 along a bridge the defenders have failed to blow in the area southwest of Grossen. During the day one division of the Corps forced the river in the Bobersberg area and broke into the town from the march. At about the same time the right flank units of 76th Corps forced another crossing, which soon linked up with the 21st Corps' division, creating a shallow bridgehead more than 10km wide. In the afternoon the German command scrambled to bring up forces to counterattack this lodgement, but this was unsuccessful.

On orders from Konev, Gordov launched his following attack along his Army's right wing to make use of the Grossen–Guben paved road. By the end of the day the 120th Corps had been brought up to the 21st Corps attack sector, followed by the 25th Tanks. On the morning of the 17th the tankers, in cooperation with units of 21st Corps, crushed the resistance of the "Matterstock" Special Designation Division and advanced 12km toward Guben and on February 18 seized the Forstadt suburb. During these two days the remainder of the Corps was engaged in stubborn fighting for several towns and villages, including Neuendorf and Merzwise while fighting continued for Lindenheim. Altogether as a result of the fighting during February 15–20 the 3rd Guards Army had crushed German resistance along the Bóbr and reached the Neisse with its right flank along a 10km sector. On February 18, Colonel Kantariya left the 197th and was replaced by Col. Nikolai Viktorovich Krasnovskii. This NKVD officer had previously served as chief of staff of the 147th Rifle Brigade and then as commander of the 828th Rifle Regiment.

General Danilovskii left his command of 120th Corps on February 21, but was made acting commander of 21st Corps on March 10. He left this position on April 4, replacing Colonel Krasnovskii, and remained in command of the 197th for the remainder of its existence. On April 13, just before the start of the final offensive the division returned to 120th Corps.

== Berlin Offensive ==
At the start of the Berlin offensive the 3rd Guards Army was deployed on the east bank of the Neisse along a 28km front from Groß Gastrose to Klein Bademüsel. The 120th Corps now contained the 197th, 149th, and 127th Rifle Divisions. (The latter was under command of Colonel Krasnovskii.) The Corps was grouped along the axis of the main attack with the three divisions of 21st Corps. The main attack would be launched along the Army's left wing, forcing the river on a 9km sector from outside Forst to outside Klein Bademüsel. The 120th Corps had the 149th and 127th in first echelon and the 197th in second echelon. The Army's second echelon consisted of 25th Tank Corps.

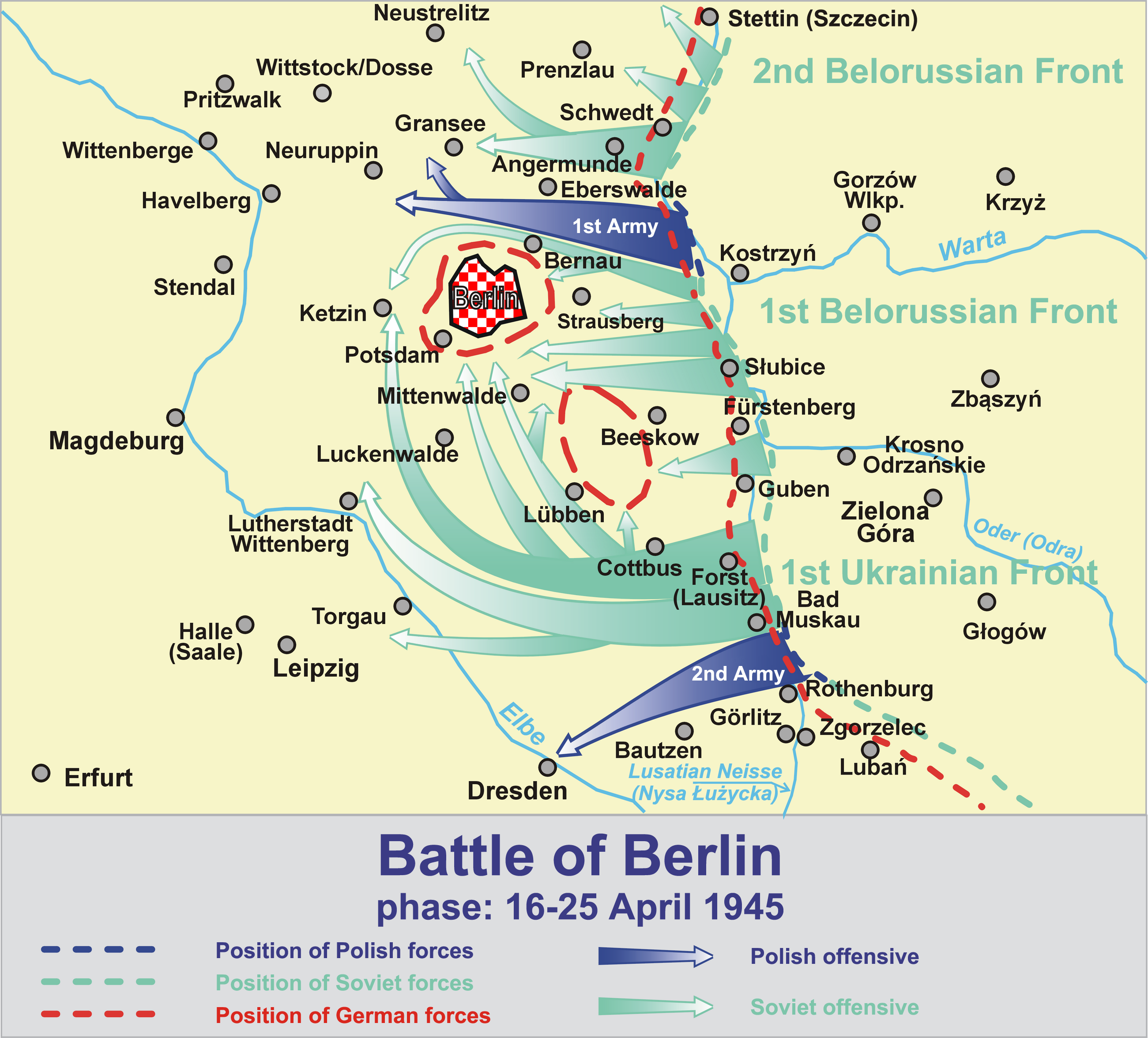
Battle of Berlin. Note locations of Forst and Cottbus and eventual encirclement of German 9th Army.

The offensive began on April 16. The 149th and 127th Divisions, operating with 25th Tanks, broke through the German main defense zone. By the end of the day the Corps had reached a line from the south part of Forst to Damsdorf, having advanced 4-5km. The success of the attack was aided to a significant degree by the Front's aviation, which destroyed Koine, a German strongpoint in the main defensive zone. The 6th Guards Tank Corps of 3rd Guards Tank Army began crossing the Neisse at 1400 hours, completing this by 1900, and by the end of the day its forward brigades were fighting alongside 120th and 21st Corps for Damsdorf.

The next day 3rd Guards Army, still with 6th Guards Tanks in support, resumed the attack at 0900 hours, encountering heavy resistance as it advanced on Cottbus. The 197th was moved up from second echelon, and 120th Corps, still working with 25th Tanks, captured the Adlig-Dubrau strongpoint and, having advanced 5-7km, by the end of the day was fighting along a line from the southern outskirts of Forst to the southern outskirts of Eilo to the southern outskirts of Gosda to Adlig-Dubrau. On April 18 the Corps, now minus the 149th but with the 106th Division attached from 76th Corps, turned its front to the north and, attacking in a wooded and lake area, advanced 3-5km and by the end of the day was fighting for Weissach and the southern Tranitz.

During April 19 the 3rd Guards Army encountered stubborn resistance from the Germans' Cottbus group of forces. The city was one of the most important resistance centers in the third defense zone. The 329th Division was moved to 120th Corps. During the day it completed the breakthrough of the second defensive zone, codenamed "Matilda", and by day's end had reached the line Tranitz–Frauendorf, in the intermediate zone between the second and third. The next day it continued to fight along the intermediate position on a line from outside Gross Lieskow to Schliechow to Karen, having advanced 1-2km. With the support of an advance by 21st Corps the 3rd Guards Tank Army managed to cut the German grouping's retreat route to the west and pinned it to the Spree River's swampy flood plain.

Over the next two days of stubborn fighting the 3rd Guards Army took Cottbus by storm and eliminated the Cottbus grouping, routing the 342nd, 214th and 275th Infantry Divisions plus a number of other elements and units. 1,500 prisoners were taken, plus 100 tanks, 2,000 motor vehicles, 60 guns, and several depots of military equipment. With the elimination of the Cottbus grouping the Army had enveloped the German Frankfurt–Guben grouping, which was based on the 9th Army, from the south and southwest. By the time this fighting ended the 120th Corps had been transferred to the west, by the end of April 22 reaching the line Werben–Raddusch, having advanced the 329th Division to the Lübben area.

=== Encirclement battle with 9th Army ===
During April 23 the 3rd Guards Army, in order to prevent a breakout by 9th Army, and to securely close the Lübbenau–Oderin sector, by the end of the day was moving its main forces to its left flank, where 120th Corps was already operating. It continued fighting along its previous line, having slightly lengthened its front to the left, and by the end of the day had occupied the line Briesen–Lübbenau–Lübben–Krausnick. The encircled German grouping contained about 200,000 men, more than 2,000 guns and mortars, and more than 200 tanks and assault guns. As the result of the lateral regrouping the 3rd Guards had firmly closed all avenues to a German retreat to the south and southwest, having created a solid front of rifle units.

The commander of the encircled grouping, Gen. der Inf. T. Busse, received orders from Hitler on April 25 to break through the encirclement ring and attack in the direction of Halbe in an effort to link up with 12th Army, which was operating southwest of Berlin. On the morning of April 26 the 120th Corps was still fighting to reduce the pocket in an area from Burg to Lübbenau to Krausnick and Teirow, with 25th Tanks concentrated behind it. Gordov was ordered to maintain one division in reserve in Teupitz; to block all the forest roads running from east to west; to create strongpoints along the Cottbus–Berlin road; and take several other measures to prevent a breakout. After an overnight regrouping the German command had created a powerful breakthrough grouping led by 50 tanks to strike the boundary between 3rd Guards and 28th Armies. By 1000 hours it had created a gap between 329th and 58th Divisions in the Halbe area and had cut the Baruth–Zossen highway, which was the main communications artery for both Soviet armies. The just-arrived 389th Rifle Division, along with the 25th Tanks, counterattacked the breakthrough group from the Stackow area and isolated it from the remainder of the 9th Army. As a result of fighting during the remainder of the day and overnight a significant part of the breakthrough group was destroyed in the woods northeast of Baruth. 120th Corps remained on the Lübben–Krausnick–Teupitz line.

Following the elimination of the breakthrough group the encircled German forces were occupying no more than 900km^{2}. On April 27, Gordov was ordered to preempt the formation of another breakthrough group by attacking with his first echelon divisions from the south and west in the general direction of Münchehofe. The 149th and 253rd Divisions were to take up defensive positions along the line from Terpt and further north along the highway as far as Neuendorf. Despite these efforts the 9th Army made a further effort to break through the encirclement ring in the direction of Halbe. During the day numerous efforts were made by groups of up to 1,000 men, supported by armor, but none were successful. 1st Belorussian Front's 3rd Army linked up with units of 21st Corps in the Lopten–Halbe area.

As a result of the April 27 fighting the German group of forces in the woods north of Baruth was eliminated, as were all their attempts to again organize a breakthrough to the west. By now the pocket had shrunk to about 400km^{2}. During the next day forces of both Fronts continued squeezing the ring. In the morning the 9th Army made another effort to escape through the Halbe area with a group up to an infantry division in strength, supported by up to 18-20 tanks. This struck the sector Teirow–Lopten occupied by 21st Corps and 40th Rifle Corps of 3rd Army. By the end of the day, having beaten off 12 German attacks, the units of both Corps continued to hold their previous positions, taking prisoners and seizing equipment. Meanwhile, the 120th Corps attacked along the western bank of the Spree but made only marginal gains, reaching the southern outskirts of Wendish-Buchholz. By the end of the day the pocket was about 10km north-to-south and up to 14km east-to-west.

The German command faced the prospect of complete defeat of 9th Army and so overnight undertook a new and decisive attempt to break out with the bulk of its remaining forces in an effort to link up with another break-in attempt by 12th Army. The attack began at 0100 hours on April 29, led by up to 10,000 infantry, supported by 35-40 tanks, at the Teirow–Halbe boundary. At dawn, following heavy fighting, the German grouping managed to break through the 21st and 40th Corps, reach the Staatsforst Stachow woods and cut the highway 3km southeast of Tornow. The breakout was temporarily halted by units of 28th Army's 3rd Guards Rifle Corps but the German grouping was now reinforced to a strength of up to 45,000 troops and created a 2km-wide breach between 50th Guards and 54th Guards Rifle Divisions in the Münchendorf area. Taking advantage of this breach, despite powerful artillery and mortar fire from north and south, German forces began to break out, first in small groups and then in entire columns, to the Staatsforst Kummersdorf woods. By the end of the day the breakout had again been halted by reinforcements from 3rd Guards and 4th Guards Tank Armies and the 117th Guards Rifle Division. At the same time the 120th and 76th Corps were attacking toward 21st Corps in an effort to re-close the gap in the Teirow sector. As a result of these and other counterattacks the greater part of 9th Army was again encircled. It was still 30km from 12th Army.

Overnight, the Army commanders of 1st Ukrainian Front undertook a number of measures directed at preventing any further German advance to the west and finally eliminating the pocketed forces. Gordov directed his corps operating in the Tornow–Freidorf area to destroy the German units by attacks from the east. Meanwhile, the German grouping continued to make desperate efforts to escape, gaining another 10km to the west. By the end of the day 3rd Guards Army, fighting through the Staatsforst Stachow woods, destroyed the tail end of the grouping. At this point its remnants had been split into separate groups which were out of contact with each other, and mass surrenders began; 1st Ukrainian Front alone took 24,000 prisoners. The last resistance ended on May 1.

== Postwar ==
When the shooting stopped the division was advancing on Prague with most of its Front's forces. In final honors on June 4, the 828th and 862nd Rifle Regiments, plus the 261st Artillery Regiment, were awarded the Order of Kutuzov, 3rd Degree, and the 418th Antitank Battalion received the Order of Alexander Nevsky, all for their roles in the fighting for Dresden. On the same date the division as a whole was decorated with the same Order, in the 2nd Degree, for its part in the liquidation of German 9th Army. General Danilovskii went on to command the 80th Rifle and 112th Guards Rifle Divisions postwar and, after furthering his education, spent most of the rest of his career in military research before his retirement in February 1959.

According to STAVKA Order No. 11096 of May 29, 1945, part 8, the 197th is listed as one of the rifle divisions to be "disbanded in place". It was disbanded in accordance with the directive between July 10–15.
