= Basakin =

Basakin Басакин
- Settlement
- Location within Volgograd Oblast Location within Russia
- Coordinates: 48°09′N 42°16′E
- Country: Russia
- Region: Volgograd Oblast
- District: Chernyshkovsky District
- Time zone: UTC+4:00

Basakin (Russian: Басакин) is a rural locality (a settlement) and the administrative center of Basakinskoye Rural Settlement, Chernyshkovsky District, Volgograd Oblast, Russia. The population was 1,041 as of 2010. There are 24 streets.

== Geography ==
Basakin is located 33 km south of Chernyshkovsky (the district's administrative centre) by road. Filatov is the nearest rural locality.
