= Popov, Kumylzhensky District, Volgograd Oblast =

Popov Попов
- Khutor
- Location within Volgograd Oblast Location within Russia
- Coordinates: 49°58′N 42°05′E
- Country: Russia
- Region: Volgograd Oblast
- District: Kumylzhensky District
- Time zone: UTC+4:00

Popov (Russian: Попов) is a rural locality (a khutor) and the administrative center of Popovskoye Rural Settlement, Kumylzhensky District, Volgograd Oblast, Russia. The population was 662 as of 2010. There are 14 streets.

== Geography ==
Popov is located in forest steppe, on Khopyorsko-Buzulukskaya Plain, on the bank of the Yedovlya River, 54 km northwest of Kumylzhenskaya (the district's administrative centre) by road. Olkhovsky is the nearest rural locality.
