= Rossoshansky =

Rossoshansky (masculine), Rossoshanskaya (feminine), or Rossoshanskoye (neuter) may refer to:

- Rossoshansky District, a district of Voronezh Oblast, Russia
- Rossoshansky (rural locality), a rural locality (a settlement) in Volgograd Oblast, Russia
