= Yarskoy 2-y =

Yarskoy 2-y Ярской 2-й
- Khutor
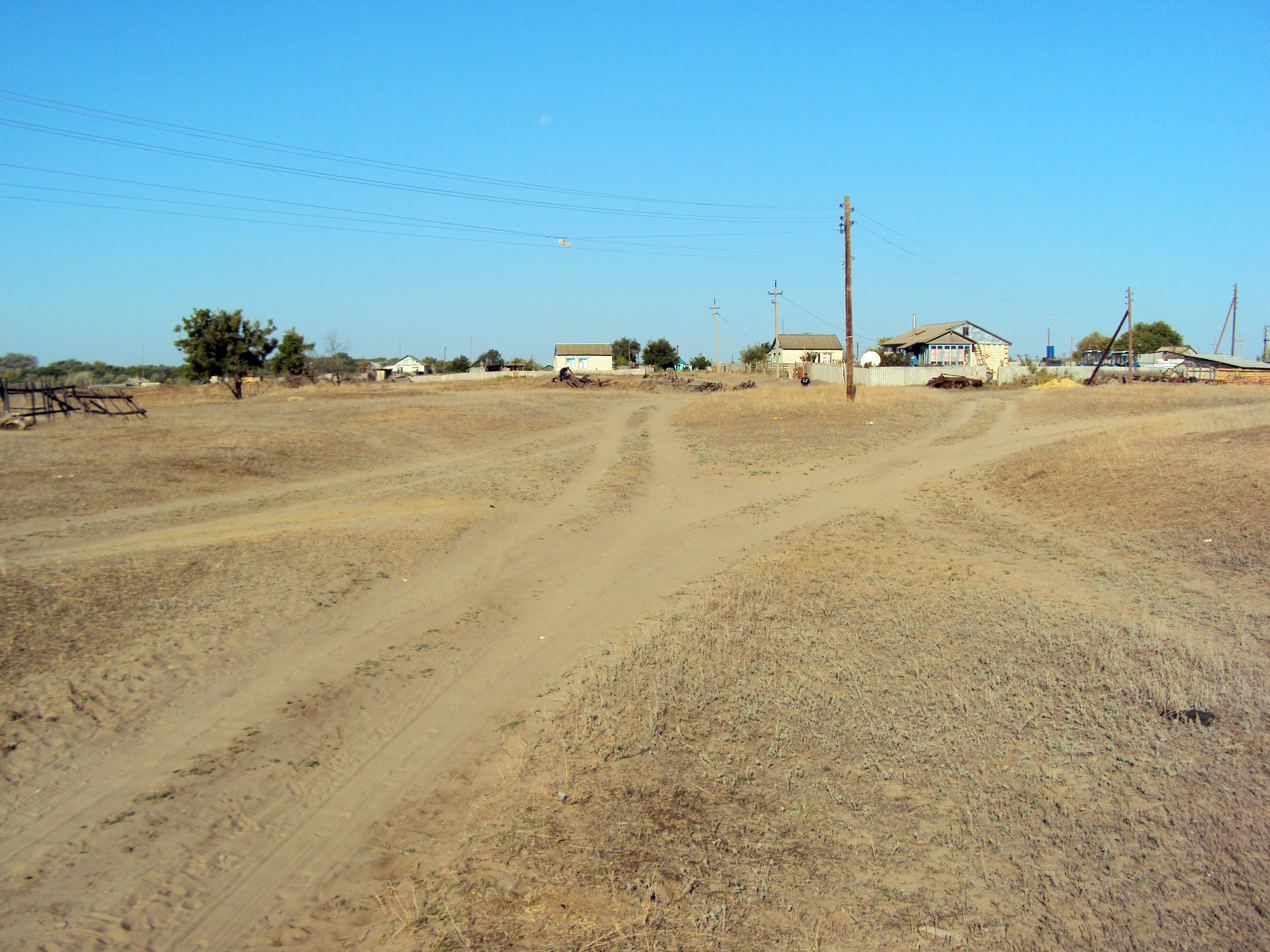

- Location within Volgograd Oblast Location within Russia
- Coordinates: 49°36′N 42°37′E
- Country: Russia
- Region: Volgograd Oblast
- District: Kumylzhensky District
- Time zone: UTC+4:00

Yarskoy 2-y (Russian: Ярской 2-й) is a rural locality (a khutor) in Krasnyanskoye Rural Settlement, Kumylzhensky District, Volgograd Oblast, Russia. The population was 35 as of 2010.

== Geography ==
Yarskoy 2-y is located between Don and Medveditsa Rivers, 62 km south of Kumylzhenskaya (the district's administrative centre) by road. Buyerak-Popovsky is the nearest rural locality.
