= Yelansky =

Yelansky (masculine), Yelanskaya (feminine), or Yelanskoye (neuter) may refer to:

- Yelansky District, a district of Volgograd Oblast, Russia
- Yelansky (rural locality) (Yelanskaya, Yelanskoye), name of several rural localities in Russia
