= Nizhnegnutov =

Nizhnegnutov Нижнегнутов
- Khutor
- Location within Volgograd Oblast Location within Russia
- Coordinates: 48°02′N 42°22′E
- Country: Russia
- Region: Volgograd Oblast
- District: Chernyshkovsky District
- Time zone: UTC+4:00

Nizhnegnutov (Russian: Нижнегнутов) is a rural locality (a khutor) and the administrative center of Nizhnegnutovskoye Rural Settlement, Chernyshkovsky District, Volgograd Oblast, Russia. The population was 1,054 as of 2010. There are 17 streets.

== Geography ==
Nizhnegnutov is located on the bank of the Tsimlyansk Reservoir, 50 km south of Chernyshkovsky (the district's administrative centre) by road. Loznoy is the nearest rural locality.
