= Yarskoy =

Yarskoy Ярской
- Khutor
- Location within Volgograd Oblast Location within Russia
- Coordinates: 48°29′N 42°19′E
- Country: Russia
- Region: Volgograd Oblast
- District: Chernyshkovsky District
- Time zone: UTC+4:00

Yarskoy (Russian: Ярской) is a rural locality (a khutor) in Chernyshkovskoye Urban Settlement, Chernyshkovsky District, Volgograd Oblast, Russia. The population was 96 as of 2010. There is 1 street.

== Geography ==
Yarskoy is located 12 km northeast of Chernyshkovsky (the district's administrative centre) by road. Chernyshkovsky is the nearest rural locality.
