= Yelansky (rural locality) =

Yelansky (Russian: Еланский; masculine), Yelanskaya (Еланская; feminine), or Yelanskoye (Еланское; neuter) is the name of several rural localities in Russia:

- Yelansky, Irkutsk Oblast, a settlement in Kuytunsky District of Irkutsk Oblast
- Yelansky, Saratov Oblast, a settlement in Samoylovsky District of Saratov Oblast
- Yelansky, Sverdlovsk Oblast, a settlement in Kamyshlovsky District of Sverdlovsk Oblast
- Yelansky, Volgograd Oblast, a khutor in Bukanovsky Selsoviet of Kumylzhensky District of Volgograd Oblast
- Yelansky, Kolenovskoye Rural Settlement, Novokhopyorsky District, Voronezh Oblast, a settlement in Kolenovskoye Rural Settlement of Novokhopyorsky District of Voronezh Oblast
- Yelansky, Novokhopyorsk Urban Settlement, Novokhopyorsky District, Voronezh Oblast, a settlement under the administrative jurisdiction of Novokhopyorsk Urban Settlement, Novokhopyorsky District, Voronezh Oblast
- Yelanskaya, Rostov Oblast, a stanitsa in Veshenskoye Rural Settlement of Sholokhovsky District of Rostov Oblast
- Yelanskaya, Tyumen Oblast, a village in Karagaysky Rural Okrug of Vagaysky District of Tyumen Oblast
