= Rossoshansky (rural locality) =

Rossoshansky Россошанский
- Settlement
- Location within Volgograd Oblast Location within Russia
- Coordinates: 48°05′N 42°07′E
- Country: Russia
- Region: Volgograd Oblast
- District: Chernyshkovsky District
- Time zone: UTC+4:00

Rossoshansky (Russian: Россошанский) is a rural locality (a settlement) in Basakinskoye Rural Settlement, Chernyshkovsky District, Volgograd Oblast, Russia. The population was 52 as of 2010. There are 3 streets.

== Geography ==
Rossoshansky is located 50 km south of Chernyshkovsky (the district's administrative centre) by road. Nizyanka is the nearest rural locality.
