= Yelansky, Volgograd Oblast =

Yelansky Еланский
- Khutor
- Location within Volgograd Oblast Location within Russia
- Coordinates: 49°35′N 42°10′E
- Country: Russia
- Region: Volgograd Oblast
- District: Kumylzhensky District
- Time zone: UTC+4:00

Yelansky (Russian: Еланский) is a rural locality (a khutor) in Bukanovskoye Rural Settlement, Kumylzhensky District, Volgograd Oblast, Russia. The population was 39 as of 2010.

== Geography ==
Yelansky is located in forest steppe, on Khopyorsko-Buzulukskaya Plain, on the right bank of the Don River, 53 km southwest of Kumylzhenskaya (the district's administrative centre) by road. Tyukovnoy is the nearest rural locality.
