= Samoylovsky =

Samoylovsky (masculine), Samoylovskaya (feminine), or Samoylovskoye (neuter) may refer to:

- Samoylovsky District, a district of Saratov Oblast, Russia
- Samoylovsky (rural locality) (Samoylovskaya, Samoylovskoye), several rural localities in Russia
- Samoylovsky Island, an island housing a Russian Arctic research station
