= Samoylovsky, Volgograd Oblast =

Samoylovsky Самойловский
- Khutor
- Location within Volgograd Oblast Location within Russia
- Coordinates: 49°52′N 42°23′E
- Country: Russia
- Region: Volgograd Oblast
- District: Kumylzhensky District
- Time zone: UTC+4:00

Samoylovsky (Russian: Самойловский) is a rural locality (a khutor) in Kumylzhenskoye Rural Settlement, Kumylzhensky District, Volgograd Oblast, Russia. The population was 1 as of 2010.

== Geography ==
Samoylovsky is located in forest steppe, on Khopyorsko-Buzulukskaya Plain, on the bank of the Peskovatka River, 15 km west of Kumylzhenskaya (the district's administrative centre) by road. Siskovsky is the nearest rural locality.
