= Belenky, Volgograd Oblast =

Belenky Беленький
- Khutor
- Location within Volgograd Oblast Location within Russia
- Coordinates: 49°43′N 42°16′E
- Country: Russia
- Region: Volgograd Oblast
- District: Kumylzhensky District
- Time zone: UTC+4:00

Belenky (Russian: Беленький) is a rural locality (a khutor) in Bukanovskoye Rural Settlement, Kumylzhensky District, Volgograd Oblast, Russia. The population was 23 as of 2010.

== Geography ==
Belenky is located in forest plain, on Khopyorsko-Buzulukskaya Plain, 44 km southwest of Kumylzhenskaya (the district's administrative centre) by road. Andreyanovsky is the nearest rural locality.
