= 190th Rifle Division =

190th Rifle Division (March 14, 1941 - September 19, 1941) 190th Rifle Division (April 1942 - September 1945)
- Active: 1941–1945
- Country: Soviet Union
- Branch: Red Army
- Type: Infantry
- Size: Division
- Engagements: Operation Barbarossa; Battle of Uman; Soviet invasion of Manchuria; Battle of Mutanchiang
- Decorations: Order of the Red Banner (2nd formation)

Commanders
- Notable commanders: Col. Grigorii Aleksandrovich Zverev; Col. Fyodor Alekseevich Makarov; Col. Stepan Borisovich Zhestakov; Maj. Gen. Rakhim Sagib Gareevich Maksutov; Col. Nikolai Georgievich Stavtsev

The 190th Rifle Division was an infantry division of the Red Army, originally formed as part of the prewar buildup of forces, based on the shtat (table of organization and equipment) of September 13, 1939. It began forming just months before the German invasion in the Kiev Special Military District, where it was soon assigned to the 49th Rifle Corps in the reserves of Southwestern Front. At the start of Operation Barbarossa it was in western Ukraine and quickly came under intense pressure from the 1st Panzer Group which split the Corps apart. Forced to the south and east it was assigned to 6th Army and in early August was encircled and destroyed near Uman.

In October a named rifle division began forming in Far Eastern Front; this would be redesignated as a new 190th in April 1942. Through most of its existence it was in 25th Army, but just prior to the Soviet invasion of Manchuria in August 1945 it was reassigned to 5th Army. As part of 1st Far Eastern Front this Army quickly pierced the Japanese frontier defenses and within days was advancing on Mudanjiang, which fell on August 16, two days before the Japanese capitulation. The 190th's performance was rewarded with the Order of the Red Banner, but it was disbanded in September.

== 1st Formation ==
The division began forming on March 14, 1941, at Cherkasy in the Kiev Special Military District. As of June 22, 1941 it had the following order of battle:

- 587th Rifle Regiment
- 621st Rifle Regiment
- 890th Rifle Regiment
- 427th Artillery Regiment
- 391st Howitzer Artillery Regiment
- 33rd Antitank Battalion
- 236th Antiaircraft Battalion
- 264th Reconnaissance Battalion
- 331st Sapper Battalion
- 556th Signal Battalion
- 22nd Medical/Sanitation Battalion
- 227th Chemical Defense (Anti-gas) Company
- 337th Motor Transport Battalion
- 351st Motorized Field Bakery
- 381st Field Postal Station
- 589th Field Office of the State Bank

Col. Grigorii Aleksandrovich Zverev was assigned to command on the day the division began forming and would remain in this position for the duration of the first formation. He had most recently served as chief of infantry of the 146th Rifle Division. When the German invasion began the division was still a long way from being complete, but was in the reserves of Southwestern Front (the renamed Kiev District) as part of the 49th Rifle Corps, which also included the 197th and 199th Rifle Divisions. By June 28 the division was concentrated at Chortkiv and was preparing for combat.

== Battle of Uman ==
By the end of July 7 the 197th and 190th Divisions were attempting to hold against the German IV Army Corps northeast of Volochysk, but the 199th had been separated from the 49th Corps by a thrust of XIV Motorized Corps. By July 10 the 49th Corps had been subordinated to 6th Army, still in Southwestern Front.

By the end of July 14 the 197th and 190th had fallen back to positions southwest of Berdychiv, forming the right flank of 6th Army, but without much at all in support to the east. As of July 23, while the German encircling operation was commencing, the two divisions were in the vicinity of Orativ. Within days, 6th Army was hopelessly cut off from Southwestern Front and was transferred to Southern Front. This made little difference to the overall situation as in early August the Army was encircled at Uman. The 190th was one of the first units hit by the encircling forces; it was overrun and destroyed on August 6, although it was not officially written off until September 19.

Colonel Zverev escaped from the pocket and went on to an unusual fate. After a few other appointments, in March 1943 he became the commander of the 350th Rifle Division and military commandant of Kharkiv. During the Third Battle of Kharkov he was again encircled, but fell into German hands on March 22 after being heavily concussed. While in captivity he came under the influence of the Committee for the Liberation of the Peoples of Russia. On January 10, 1945, he was given command of the 650th Infantry Division (2nd Infantry Division, ROA) with the rank of major general. The division was never completed and never saw any real combat. Zverev was handed over to the Soviet authorities after a suicide attempt and was hanged, after a short trial, on August 1, 1946.

== 2nd Formation ==
The Poltavskaya Rifle Division began forming on October 23, 1941, in the 25th Army of Far Eastern Front. It was under command of Col. Aleksei Kuzmich Pavlov for just a week when he was replaced by Col. Fyodor Alekseevich Makarov. In April 1942 it was redesignated as the 2nd formation of the 190th. With this redesignation its order of battle became as follows:

- 58th Rifle Regiment
- 122nd Rifle Regiment
- 158th Rifle Regiment
- 1028th Artillery Regiment (later 427th)
- 461st Self-Propelled Artillery Battalion (in 1945)
- 54th Antitank Battalion
- 62nd Reconnaissance Company
- 317th Sapper Battalion (later 434th)
- 7th Signal Battalion (later 138th Signal Company)
- 37th Medical/Sanitation Battalion
- 110th Chemical Defense (Anti-gas) Company
- 282nd Motor Transport Company
- 554th Field Bakery (later 367th)
- 965th Divisional Veterinary Hospital
- 1885th Field Postal Station
- 178th Field Office of the State Bank

Makarov remained in command until July 14; he would later be promoted to the rank of major general and led the 69th Rifle Division during 1944–45. Col. Stepan Borisovich Zhestakov, the chief of staff of 106th Fortified Region, took over the 190th, but returned to command the 106th on December 17. He in turn was replaced by Col. Rakhim Sagib Gareevich Maksutov, who would be promoted to major general on January 27, 1943. At the end of 1942 the division became part of the 17th Rifle Corps, still in 25th Army, and it would remain under these commands until July 1945.

=== Soviet invasion of Manchuria ===
Manchurian Operation. Note initial position of 5th Army (V GE) on right.

In July 1944, General Maksutov left the 190th to take command of the 192nd Rifle Division. He was replaced by Col. Nikolai Georgievich Stavtsev, who would remain in this position into the postwar. During the early months of 1945 the division received the 461st Self-Propelled Artillery Battalion of 12 SU-76s (plus one T-70 command tank) to supplement its mobile firepower in anticipation of operations in the difficult terrain of Manchuria.

During the buildup to the Manchurian operation the 190th was moved to 5th Army in the Primorsk Group of Forces, joining 65th Rifle Corps, which also contained the 97th, 144th, and 371st Rifle Divisions. The Army was commanded by Col. Gen. N. I. Krylov.

Just prior to the start of the operation the Primorsk Group was redesignated as 1st Far Eastern Front. 5th Army was tasked with making the Front's main attack. It had its three rifle corps deployed abreast, with the 65th Corps on the right flank. When the attack began on August 9, it struck the Kuanyuehtai (Volynsk) center of resistance, which was held by one battalion of the Japanese 273rd Infantry Regiment of the 124th Infantry Division. The lead divisions enveloped the northern portions of the Japanese strongpoint, leaving isolated units in the rear for the second echelon to deal with. By day's end, 5th Army had torn a gap 35 km wide in the Japanese lines and had advanced anything from 16 to 22 km into the enemy rear. Within three days the second echelon forces, backed by self-propelled artillery, had liquidated all remaining strongholds. As of August 13 the main body of 65th Corps, including the 190th, were advancing to meet the 371st Division on the road to Mudanjiang. This city was taken after a two-day battle on August 15–16, after which 5th Army advanced southwestward towards Ning'an, Tunghua and Kirin. On August 18 the Japanese capitulation was announced, and 5th Army deployed to accept and process the surrendering units.

== Postwar ==
On September 19 the 190th was awarded the Order of the Red Banner in recognition of its part in the crossing of the Ussuri River and the capture of Mishan, Jilin, Yanji and Harbin. Before the end of the month it had been disbanded.
