= Tormosin =

Tormosin Тормосин
- Khutor
- Location within Volgograd Oblast Location within Russia
- Coordinates: 48°10′N 42°40′E
- Country: Russia
- Region: Volgograd Oblast
- District: Chernyshkovsky District
- Time zone: UTC+4:00

Tormosin (Russian: Тормосин) is a rural locality (a khutor) in and the administrative center of Tormosinovsky Rural Settlement, Chernyshkovsky District, Volgograd Oblast, Russia. The population was 1,414 as of 2010. There are 12 streets.

== Geography ==
Tormosin is located 46 km southeast of Chernyshkovsky (the district's administrative centre) by road. Zakharov is the nearest rural locality.
