= Southwestern Front (Soviet Union) =

WW2 Soviet Red Army formation

- Active: 22 June 1941 – 12 July 1942; 22 October 1942 – 20 October 1943
- Country: Soviet Union
- Branch: Red Army
- Type: Army Group Command
- Size: Several Armies
- Engagements: World War II; Operation Barbarossa; Battle of Moscow; Second Battle of Kharkov; Operation Little Saturn; Third Battle of Kharkov; Donbas Strategic Offensive

Commanders
- Notable commanders: Semyon Timoshenko; Rodion Malinovsky

The Southwestern Front (Russian: Юго-Западный фронт, ЮЗФ, romanized: Yugo-Zapadnyy front, YuZF) was a front of the Red Army during the Second World War, formed thrice.

It was first created on June 22, 1941 from the Kiev Special Military District. The western boundary of the front in June 1941 was 865 km long, from the Pripyat River and the town of Wlodawa to the Prut River and the town of Lipkany at the border with Romania. It connected to the north with the Western Front, which extended to the Lithuanian border, and to the south with the Southern Front, which extended to the city of Odessa on the Black Sea.

== Operational history ==
The Southwestern Front was on the main axis of attack by the German Army Group South during Operation Barbarossa. At the outbreak of war with Germany, the Front was commanded by Mikhail Kirponos and contained the Soviet 5th, 6th, 26th, and 12th Armies along the frontier. 16th and 19th Armies were in reserve behind the forward forces. These forces took part in the tank battles in western Ukraine and were surrounded and destroyed at the Battle of Uman and the Battle of Kiev (1941) in August and September 1941. Kirponos himself was killed during the Battle of Kiev.

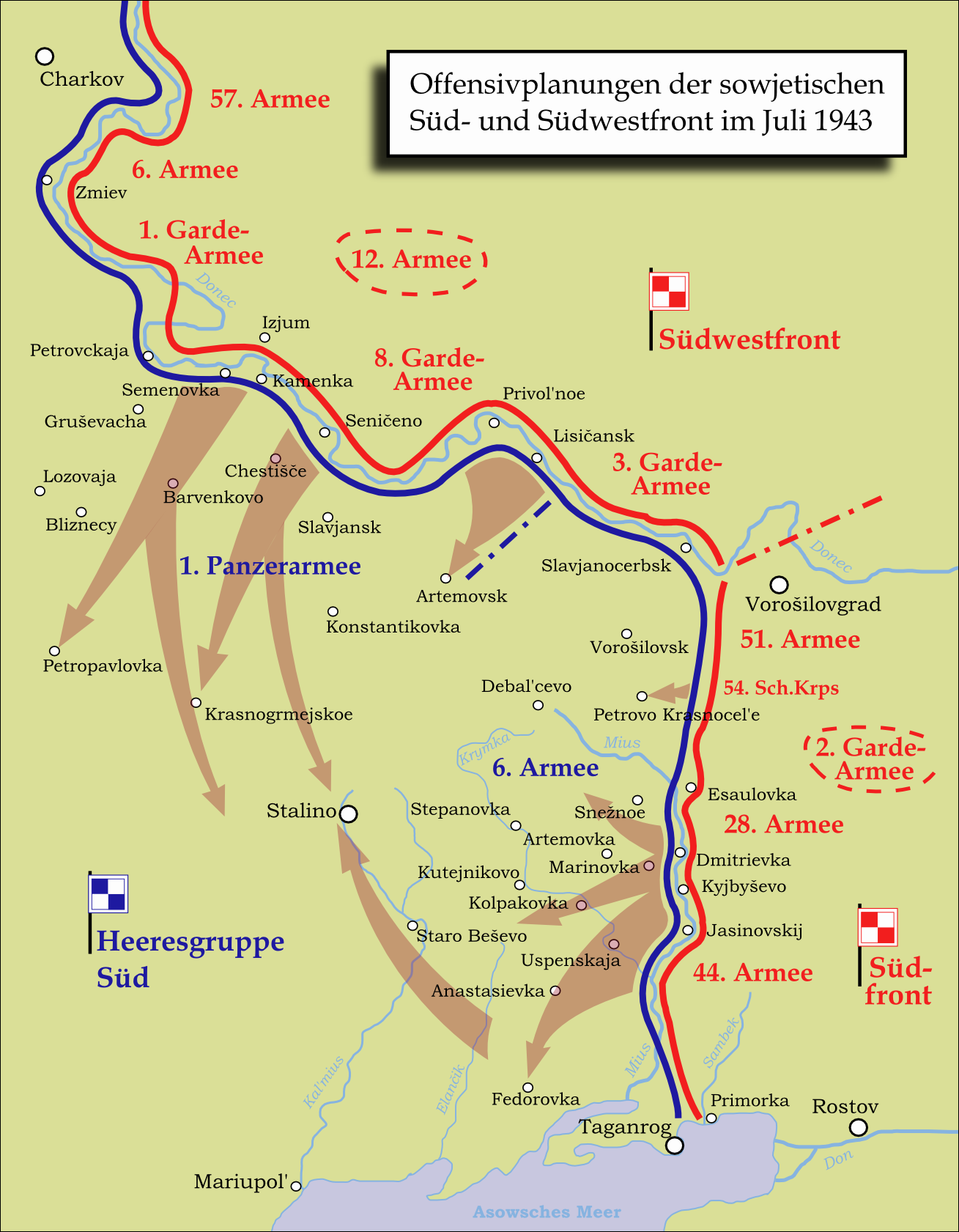
Offensive plan of the Southern Front and Southwestern Front (labelled in German as Südwestfront) in 1943

The Front was immediately re-established with new forces. During the period of the Battle of Moscow it was under the command of Marshal Timoshenko, and included from north to south the 40th, 21st, 38th and 6th Armies. It was formally disbanded on July 12, 1942 and the forces transferred to the Stalingrad Front and Southern Front.

The Front was reformed from reserve armies on October 22, 1942. It was renamed the 3rd Ukrainian Front on October 20, 1943. 3rd Ukrainian Front's first operations were the Battle of the Dnieper and the Battle of Kiev (1943).

=== Southwestern Front on 22 June 1941 ===
Composition Subordinate Front units directly under Commander of the Front:

- 31st Rifle Corps

193rd Rifle Division
195th Rifle Division
200th Rifle Division

- 36th Rifle Corps:

140th Rifle Division
146th Rifle Division
228th Rifle Division

- 49th Rifle Corps

190th Rifle Division
197th Rifle Division
199th Rifle Division

- 55th Rifle Corps

130th Rifle Division
169th Rifle Division
189th Rifle Division

- 1st Airborne Corps

1st Airborne Infantry Brigade
204th Airborne Infantry Brigade
211th Airborne Infantry Brigade

- Fortified Regions

1st Kiev
3rd Latichov
5th Khorosten
7th Novogrudok–Volynsk
13th Shepetovka
15th Ostropol
17th Izaslav

- Front Artillery

5th Anti-Tank Brigade
205th Corps Artillery Regiment
207th Corps Artillery Regiment
368th Corps Artillery Regiment
457th Corps Artillery Regiment
458th Corps Artillery Regiment
507th Corps Artillery Regiment
543rd Corps Artillery Regiment
646th Corps Artillery Regiment
305th Cannon Artillery Regiment (RGK)
355th Cannon Artillery Regiment (RGK)
4th High Power Howitzer Regiment (RGK)
168th High Power Howitzer Regiment (RGK)
324th High Power Howitzer Regiment (RGK)
330th High Power Howitzer Regiment (RGk)
526th High Power Howitzer Regiment (RGK)
331st Howitzer Regiment (RGK)
376th Howitzer Regiment (RGK)
529th Howitzer Regiment (RGK)
538th Howitzer Regiment (RGK)
589th Howitzer Regiment (RGK)
34th Independent Special Artillery Division
245th Independent Special Artillery Division
315th Independent Special Artillery Division
316th Independent Special Artillery Division
263rd Independent Anti-Aircraft Artillery Division

- Front PVO

3rd Air Defense Division
4th Air Defense Division
11th Air Defense Brigade
Air Defense Brigade Regions:

Stanislavov
Rovno
Zhitomir
Tarnopol
Vinnitsa

- Front Tank/Mechanized Troops

19th Mechanized Corps:

40th Tank Division
43rd Tank Division
213th Mechanized Division
21st Motorcycle Regiment

24th Mechanized Corps:

45th Tank Division
49th Tank Division
216th Mechanized Division
17th Motorcycle Regiment

1st Independent Armoured Car Division

- Front Air Forces

44th Fighter Aviation Division
64th Fighter Aviation Division
19th Bomber Aviation Division
62nd Bomber Aviation Division
14th Mixed Aviation Division
15th Mixed Aviation Division
16th Mixed Aviation Division
17th Mixed Aviation Division
63rd Mixed Aviation Division
36th Fighter Aviation Division (PVO)
315th Air Reconnaissance Regiment
316th Air Reconnaissance Regiment

- Front Engineer Troops

45th Engineer Regiment
1st Pontoon Bridge Regiment

== Commanders ==
- Colonel General Mikhail P. Kirponos (June 1941 – September 1941: killed in action)
- Marshal Semyon K. Timoshenko (September 1941 – December 1941; April–July 1942)
- Lieutenant General Fyodor Kostenko (December 1941 – April 1942)
- Lieutenant General Nikolai F. Vatutin [promoted to Colonel General in December 1942] (October 1942 – March 1943)
- Colonel General Rodion Ia. Malinovsky (March 1943 – October 1943)
