= Belenky, Amur Oblast =

Belenky Беленький
- Settlement
- Location within Amur Oblast Location within Russia
- Coordinates: 54°52′N 124°22′E
- Country: Russia
- Region: Amur Oblast
- District: Tyndinsky District
- Time zone: UTC+9:00

Belenky (Russian: Беленький) is a rural locality (a settlement) in Belenky Selsoviet of Tyndinsky District, Amur Oblast, Russia. The population was 154 as of 2018. There are 2 streets.

== Geography ==
Belenky is located 46 km southwest of Tynda (the district's administrative centre) by road. Belenkaya is the nearest rural locality.
