= Perelazovsky =

Perelazovsky Перелазовский
- Khutor
- Location within Volgograd Oblast Location within Russia
- Coordinates: 49°08′N 42°34′E
- Country: Russia
- Region: Volgograd Oblast
- District: Kletsky District
- Time zone: UTC+4:00

Perelazovsky (Russian: Перелазовский) is a rural locality (a khutor) and the administrative center of Perelazovskoye Rural Settlement, Kletsky District, Volgograd Oblast, Russia. The population was 1,045 as of 2010. There are 23 streets.

== Geography ==
Perelazovsky is located in steppe, on the Kurtlak River, 45 km southwest of Kletskaya (the district's administrative centre) by road. Novotsaritsynsky is the nearest rural locality.
