= Samoylovskaya =

Samoylovskaya Самойловская
- Village
- Location within Vologda Oblast Location within Russia
- Coordinates: 60°25′N 39°58′E
- Country: Russia
- Region: Vologda Oblast
- District: Vozhegodsky District
- Time zone: UTC+3:00

Samoylovskaya (Russian: Самойловская) is a rural locality (a village) in Vozhegodskoye Urban Settlement, Vozhegodsky District, Vologda Oblast, Russia. The population was 3 as of 2002.

== Geography ==
Samoylovskaya is located 16 km southwest of Vozhega (the district's administrative centre) by road. Podolnaya is the nearest rural locality.
