= Samoylovsky, Astrakhan Oblast =

Samoylovsky Самойловский
- Settlement
- Location within Astrakhan Oblast Location within Russia
- Coordinates: 46°27′N 48°41′E
- Country: Russia
- Region: Astrakhan Oblast
- District: Volodarsky District
- Time zone: UTC+4:00

Samoylovsky (Russian: Самойловский) is a rural locality (a settlement) in Kozlovsky Selsoviet of Volodarsky District, Astrakhan Oblast, Russia. The population was 153 as of 2010. There are 2 streets.

== Geography ==
Samoylovsky is located 34 km (21 mi) northeast of Volodarsky (the district's administrative centre) by road. Baklanye is the nearest rural locality.
