= Chernyshkovsky District =

Chernyshkovsky District Чернышковский район (Russian)
- District
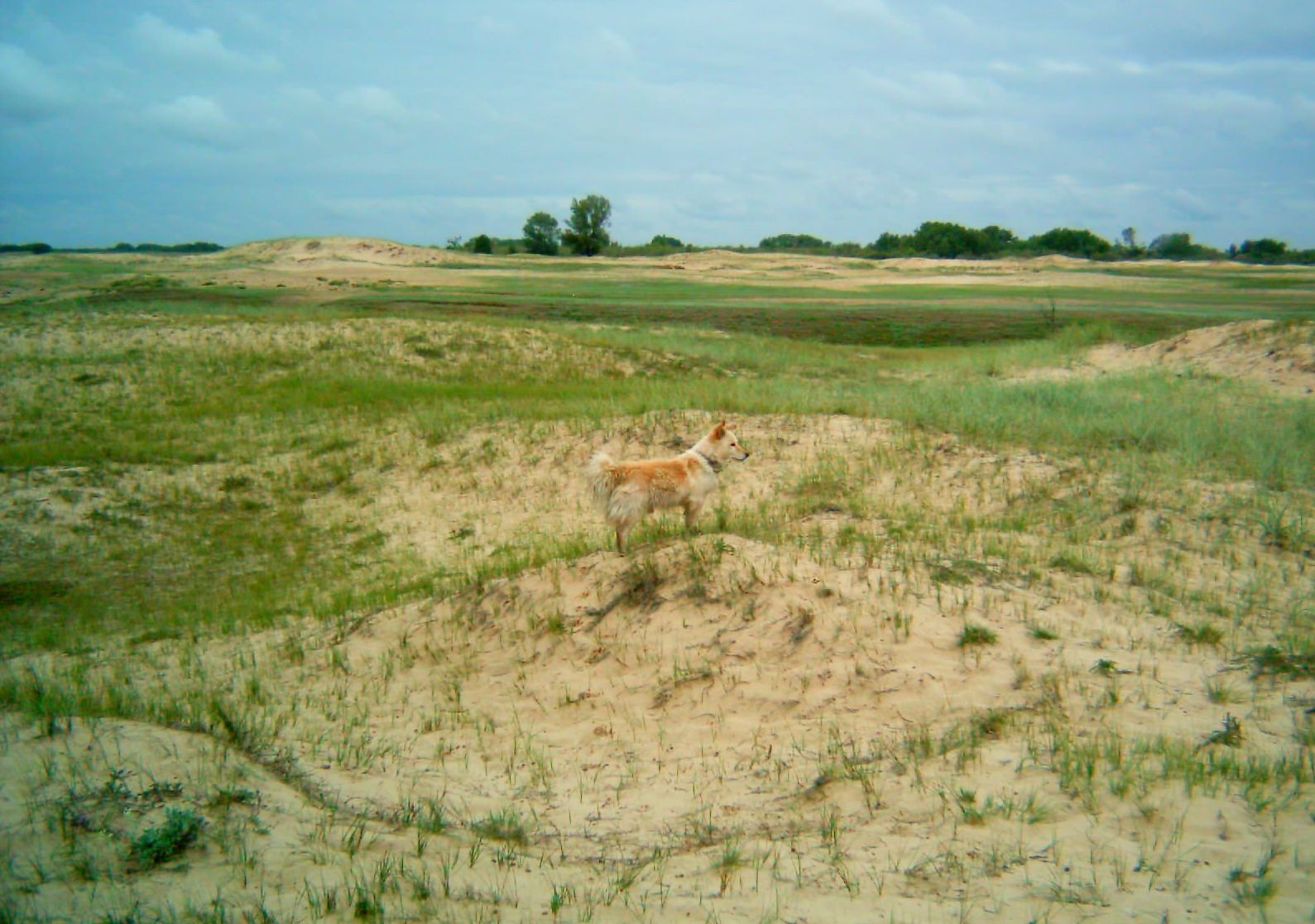
- Tsimlyansky Sands near the khutor of Tormosin in Chernyshkovsky District

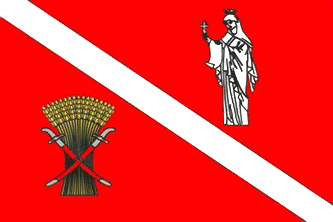
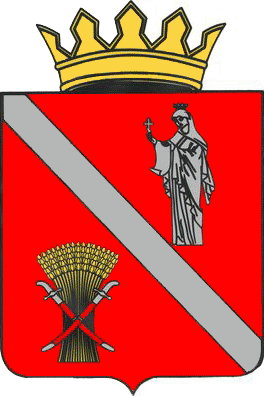
- Flag Coat of arms
- Location of Chernyshkovsky District in Volgograd Oblast
- Coordinates: 48°25′N 42°14′E
- Country: Russia
- Federal subject: Volgograd Oblast
- Established: 25 January 1935
- Administrative center: Chernyshkovsky

Area
  - Total: 3,079.96 km^{2} (1,189.18 sq mi)

Population (2010 Census)
  - Total: 16,873
  - Density: 5.4783/km^{2} (14.189/sq mi)
  - Urban: 32.0%
  - Rural: 68.0%

Administrative structure
  - Administrative divisions: 1 Urban-type settlements, 11 Selsoviets
  - Inhabited localities: 1 urban-type settlements, 44 rural localities

Municipal structure
  - Municipally incorporated as: Chernyshkovsky Municipal District
  - Municipal divisions: 1 urban settlements, 11 rural settlements
- Time zone: UTC+3 (MSK)
- OKTMO ID: 18658000
- Website: http://www.chernyshki.ru

Chernyshkovsky District (Russian: Черны́шковский райо́н) is an administrative district (raion), one of the thirty-three in Volgograd Oblast, Russia. As a municipal division, it is incorporated as Chernyshkovsky Municipal District. It is located in the southwest of the oblast. The area of the district is 3,079.96 square kilometers (1,189.18 sq mi). Its administrative center is the urban locality (a work settlement) of Chernyshkovsky. Population: 16,873 (2010 census); 18,326 (2002 Census); 19,317 (1989 Soviet census). The population of the administrative center accounts for 32.0% of the district's total population.
