= Chernyshkovsky (urban-type settlement) =

Chernyshkovsky Чернышковский
- Work settlement
- Interactive map of Chernyshkovsky
- Location of Chernyshkovsky Chernyshkovsky (Volgograd Oblast)
- Coordinates: 48°25′20″N 42°13′32″E
- Country: Russia
- Federal subject: Volgograd Oblast
- Administrative district: Chernyshkovsky District
- Founded: 1790

Population (2010 Census)
  - Total: 5,396
  - Estimate (2021): 3,565 (−33.9%)
- Time zone: UTC+3 (MSK)
- Postal codes: 404460, 404462
- OKTMO ID: 18658151051

Chernyshkovsky (Russian: Чернышковский) is an urban locality (a work settlement) and the administrative center of Chernyshkovsky District in Volgograd Oblast, Russia, located on the Tsimlya River. Population: 5,396 (2010 census); 5,446 (2002 census); 5,677 (1989 Soviet census).
