= Kumylzhenskaya =

Rural locality in Volgograd Oblast, Russia

Coordinates: 49°52′53″N 42°35′22″E

Kumylzhenskaya (Russian: Кумылженская) is a rural locality (a stanitsa) and the administrative center of Kumylzhensky District of Volgograd Oblast, Russia. Population: 7,953 (2010 census); 8,043 (2002 census); 6,851 (1989 Soviet census).

== Geography ==
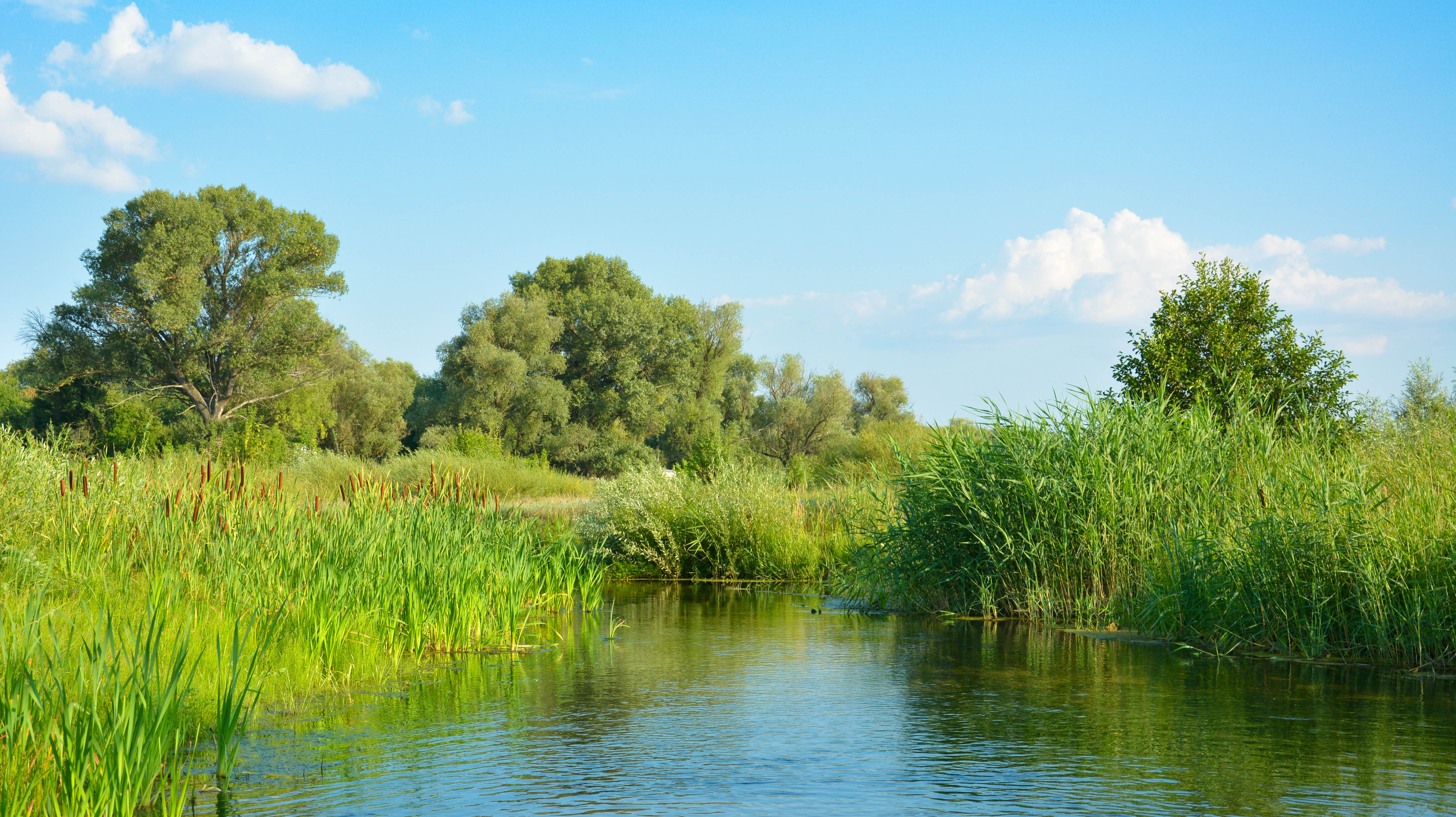
The Kumylga in the vicinity of Kumylzhenskaya

The village is located on the Kumylga river not far from its confluence with the Khopyor. The nearest railway station is located in Mikhailovka, 52 kilometres (32 mi) northeast.
