= Kumylzhensky District =

Kumylzhensky District Кумылженский район (Russian)
- District
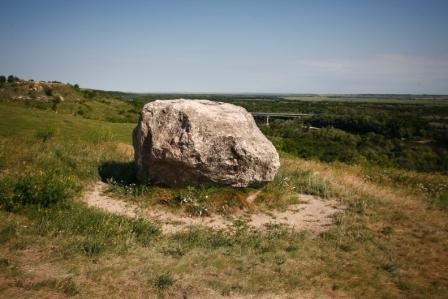
- A glacial boulder in Nizhnekhopyorsky Nature Park in Kumylzhensky District

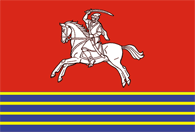
- Flag Coat of arms
- Location of Kumylzhensky District in Volgograd Oblast
- Coordinates: 49°53′N 42°36′E
- Country: Russia
- Federal subject: Volgograd Oblast
- Established: 23 June 1928
- Administrative center: Kumylzhenskaya

Area
  - Total: 2,977 km^{2} (1,149 sq mi)

Population (2010 Census)
  - Total: 21,425
  - Density: 7.197/km^{2} (18.64/sq mi)
  - Urban: 0%
  - Rural: 100%

Administrative structure
  - Administrative divisions: 17 selsoviet
  - Inhabited localities: 78 rural localities

Municipal structure
  - Municipally incorporated as: Kumylzhensky Municipal District
  - Municipal divisions: 0 urban settlements, 9 rural settlements
- Time zone: UTC+3 (MSK)
- OKTMO ID: 18646000
- Website: http://www.kumadmin.ru/

Kumylzhensky District (Russian: Кумылженский райо́н) is an administrative district (raion), one of the thirty-three in Volgograd Oblast, Russia. Municipally, it is incorporated as Kumylzhensky Municipal District. It is located in the west of the oblast. The area of the district is 2,977 square kilometers (1,149 sq mi). Its administrative center is the rural locality (a stanitsa) of Kumylzhenskaya. Population: 21,425 (2010 census); 23,499 (2002 Census); 23,647 (1989 Soviet census). The population of Kumylzhenskaya accounts for 37.1% of the district's total population.

== History ==
The district was called Podtyolkovsky District from 1970–1994.
