= 159th Rifle Division =

159th Rifle Division includes the following formations:

- 159th Rifle Division (1940–1941)
- 159th Rifle Division (1942–1943)
- 159th Rifle Division (1943–1946)

== See also ==
- 159th Division (disambiguation)
