= 53rd Infantry Regiment "Umbria" =

Inactive Italian Army infantry unit

- 53° Reggimento Fanteria "Umbria"
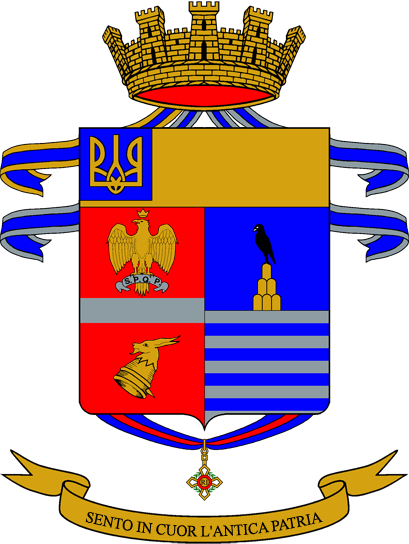
- Regimental coat of arms
- Active: 16 April 1861 – 8 Sept. 1943; 1 July 1963 – 31 March 1993
- Country: Italy
- Branch: Italian Army
- Part of: Mechanized Brigade "Gorizia"
- Garrison/HQ: Pavia di Udine
- Motto: "Sento in cuor l'antica Patria"
- Anniversaries: 18 December 1942 – Battle of the Don
- Decorations: 1× Military Order of Italy; 1× Gold Medal of Military Valor; 3× Silver Medals of Military Valor

Insignia
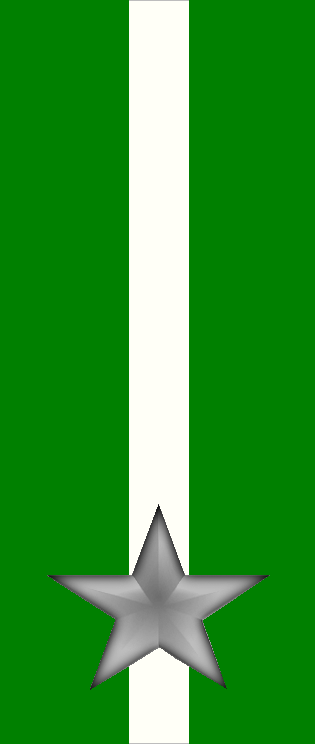
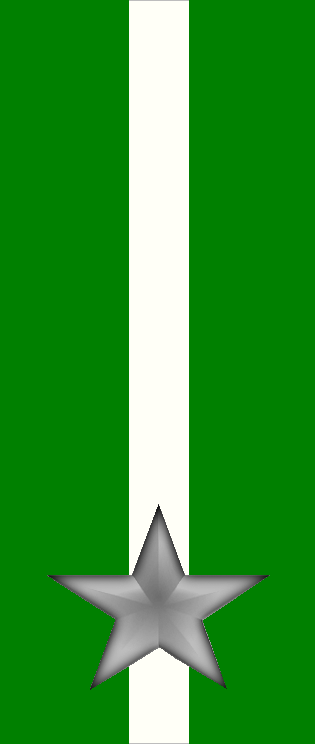
- Regimental gorget patches

The 53rd Infantry Regiment "Umbria" (Italian: 53° Reggimento Fanteria "Umbria") is an inactive unit of the Italian Army last based in Pavia di Udine. The regiment is named for the region of Umbria and part of the Italian Army's infantry arm. The regiment was one of ten infantry regiments formed by the Royal Italian Army on 16 April 1861. In 1866, the regiment participated in the Third Italian War of Independence. During World War I, the regiment fought on the Italian front. During World War II, the regiment was assigned to the 2nd Infantry Division "Sforzesca", with which it fought in the Greco-Italian War and from summer 1942 in the Soviet Union. The "Sforzesca" division and its regiments were destroyed during the Red Army's Operation Little Saturn. In June 1943, the "Sforzesca" division its regiments were reformed, but after the announcement of the Armistice of Cassibile on 8 September 1943 the division was disbanded by invading German forces.

The regiment was reformed in 1963 and assigned to the Infantry Division "Folgore". The regiment was tasked with maintaining and manning fortifications of the Alpine Wall on the border with Yugoslavia. In 1975 the regiment was disbanded and its flag and traditions assigned to the 53rd Infantry Fortification Battalion "Umbria", which was assigned to the Mechanized Division "Folgore". In 1986 the division was disbanded and the battalion was assigned to the Mechanized Brigade "Gorizia". On 31 March 1993, the battalion was disbanded. The regiment's anniversary falls on 18 December 1942, the third day of the Red Army's Operation Little Saturn, during which the regiment fought to its annihilation.

== History ==
=== Formation ===
On 16 April 1861, the Royal Italian Army formed the Brigade "Umbria" in Palermo. The brigade consisted of the 53rd Infantry Regiment and 54th Infantry Regiment, which were formed on the same day. The 53rd Infantry Regiment received three battalions ceded by the 1st Infantry Regiment and 2nd Infantry Regiment of the Brigade "Re", and by the 5th Infantry Regiment of the Brigade "Aosta", while the 54th Infantry Regiment received three battalions ceded by the 6th Infantry Regiment of the Brigade "Aosta", and by the 25th Infantry Regiment and 26th Infantry Regiment of the Brigade "Bergamo".

On 1 August 1862, the regiment ceded one of its depot companies to help form the 66th Infantry Regiment (Brigade "Valtellina"), and its 17th Company and 18th Company to help form the 70th Infantry Regiment (Brigade "Ancona"). In 1866, the regiment participated in the Third Italian War of Independence. After the war the regiment participated in the suppression of the Seven and a Half Days Revolt in Palermo. For the suppression of the rebellious people of Palermo the 53rd Infantry Regiment was an awarded a Silver Medal of Military Valor, which was affixed to the regiment's flag.

On 25 October 1871, the brigade level was abolished, and the two regiments of the Brigade "Umbria" were renamed 53rd Infantry Regiment "Umbria", respectively 54th Infantry Regiment "Umbria". On 2 January 1881, the brigade level was reintroduced, and the two regiments were renamed again as 53rd Infantry Regiment (Brigade "Umbria") and 54th Infantry Regiment (Brigade "Umbria"). On 1 November 1884, the regiment ceded some of its companies to help form the 94th Infantry Regiment (Brigade "Messina") in Lecce. In 1895–96, the regiment provided six officers and 241 enlisted for units deployed to Italian Eritrea for the First Italo-Ethiopian War. In 1911, the regiment provided men and materiel for units deployed to Libya for the Italo-Turkish War.

=== World War I ===
At the outbreak of World War I, the Brigade "Umbria" formed, together with the Brigade "Como" and the 17th Field Artillery Regiment, the 2nd Division. At the time the 53rd Infantry Regiment consisted of three battalions, each of which fielded four fusilier companies and one machine gun section. After Italy's entry into the war on 23 May 1915, the Brigade "Umbria" was deployed to the Cadore region in the alpine section of the Italian front. From 28 July 1915 to 3 November 1917 the brigade held the front in the Val d'Ansiei. On 15 July 1917, the 53rd Infantry Regiment's depot in Vercelli formed the 282nd Infantry Regiment (Brigade "Foggia").

After the disastrous Battle of Caporetto the brigade retreated to the new Italian frontline along the Piave river. In November 1917, the brigade fought in the First Battle of the Piave River at Nervesa. On 1 December 1917, the brigade was replaced in Nervesa by the 41st British Division and in the night of 11–12 December the Brigade "Umbria" entered the frontline on the Monte Grappa massif. The rest of the month the brigade fought in the First Battle of Monte Grappa on Monte Solarolo. In 1918, the brigade remained on the Monte Grappa and fought in there in the Second Battle of Monte Grappa and Third Battle of Monte Grappa.

=== Interwar years ===
On 27 October 1926, the Brigade "Umbria" was renamed II Infantry Brigade. The brigade was the infantry component of the 2nd Territorial Division of Novara, which also included the 17th Field Artillery Regiment. On the same date the brigade's two infantry regiments were renamed 53rd Infantry Regiment "Umbria", respectively 54th Infantry Regiment "Umbria". The II Infantry Brigade also received the 68th Infantry Regiment "Palermo" from the disbanded Brigade "Palermo".

In 1934 the 53rd Infantry Regiment "Umbria" moved from Vercelli to Ivrea and during the same year the 2nd Territorial Division of Novara changed its name to 2nd Infantry Division "Sforzesca". A name change that also extended to the division's infantry brigade. In 1935, the 53rd Infantry Regiment "Umbria" ceded its I Battalion to the 38th Infantry Regiment "Ravenna" of the 26th Infantry Division "Assietta", which was mobilized for the Second Italo-Ethiopian War. After the end of the war the battalion returned to the regiment. On 25 April 1939, the II Infantry Brigade "Sforzesca" was disbanded and the three infantry regiments came under direct command of the division. On the same date the 53rd and 54th infantry regiments and 17th Artillery Regiment changed their names to "Sforzesca". On 24 May 1939, the division ceded the 68th Infantry Regiment "Palermo" to the newly activated 58th Infantry Division "Legnano". During the same year the regiment moved from Ivrea to Biella.

=== World War II ===
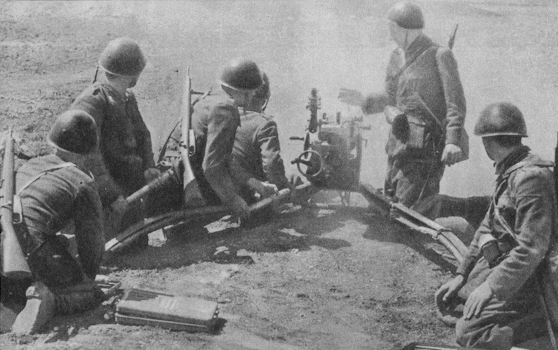
"Sforzesca" division troops on the Eastern Front

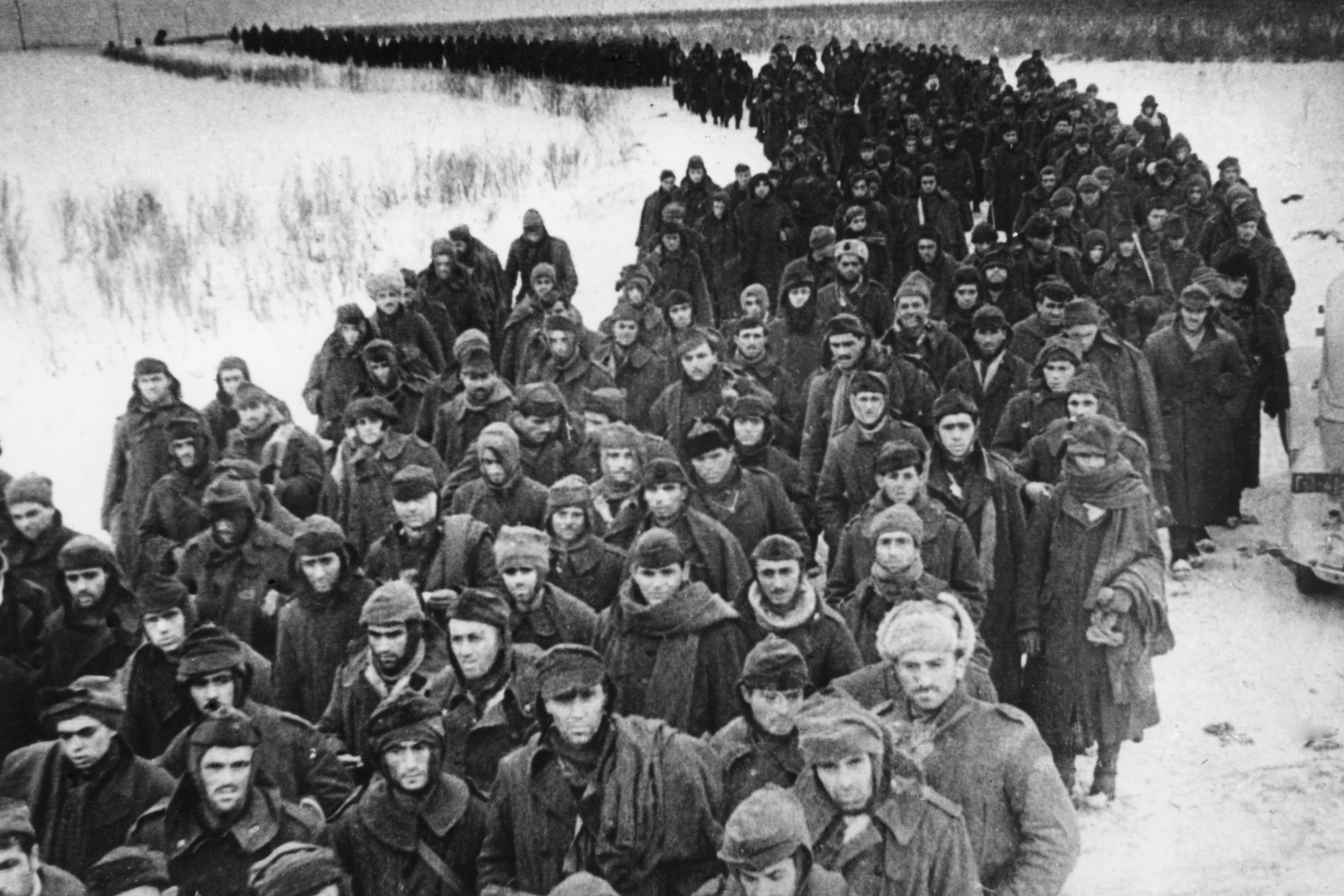
Italian troops captured during Operation Little Saturn

At the outbreak of World War II, the 53rd Infantry Regiment "Sforzesca" consisted of a command, a command company, three fusilier battalions, a support weapons battery equipped with 65/17 infantry support guns, and a mortar company equipped with 81mm Mod. 35 mortars. On 10 June 1940, the "Sforzesca" division participated in the invasion of France. The division operated between Claviere and Cesana Torinese and attacked in the direction of Briançon. In the night of 23 to 24 June 1940, the division was transferred to the reserve and replaced by the 58th Infantry Division "Legnano".

==== Greco-Italian War ====
In January 1941, the 2nd Infantry Division "Sforzesca" was transferred to Albania to shore up the crumbling Italian front during the Greco-Italian War. The division entered the front in the area of Tepelenë. The division had its first encounter with Greek army forces on 28 January on the ridge at Mali i Shëndëllisë. Heavy fighting, with frequent hand-to-hand combat, continued until 28 February. During the Italian offensive on 9 March 1941, the division advanced towards Bregu i Buzit. After the Battle of Greece the "Sforzesca" division remained on occupation duty in Greece until the middle of July 1941. For its conduct and service on the Greek front from 13 February to 23 April 1941 the 53rd Infantry Regiment "Sforzesca" was awarded a Silver Medal of Military Valor, which was affixed to the regiment's flag and added to the regiment's coat of arms.

==== Eastern Front ====
In spring 1942, the "Sforzesca" division was assigned to the Italian 8th Army, which was readied to be deployed in summer 1942 to the Eastern Front. In June 1942, the division arrived in Dnipropetrovsk Oblast in Ukraine, where it was assigned to the XXXV Army Corps. In July 1942, the division participated in the capture of Khrustalnyi in Luhansk Oblast. In early August 1942, the division established a bridgehead on the eastern bank of the Don river and advanced along the Khopyor river to the village of Yarskoy 1-y. On 12 August 1942, the "Sforzesca" division was attacked by the Soviet 63rd Army, which consisted of the 197th Rifle Division, 203rd Rifle Division and 14th Guards Rifle Division. The "Sforzesca" division was forced give up the bridgehead and fall back to the villages of Yagodnyi and Chebotarevskii to the South of the Don river. While Chebotarevskii was overrun by Red Army forces, Yagodnyi held and on 21 August the remaining Italian troops counterattacked. On 24 August, the stronghold at Yagodnyi had run out of ammunition, but the Italian troops there were saved by the arrival of the 3rd Bersaglieri Regiment and 6th Bersaglieri Regiment of the 3rd Cavalry Division "Principe Amedeo Duca d'Aosta" and the German 79th Infantry Division.

For its conduct and service at Yagodnyi between 17 and 31 August 1942 the 53rd Infantry Regiment "Sforzesca" was awarded a Silver Medal of Military Valor, which was affixed to the regiment's flag and added to the regiment's coat of arms.

On 12 December 1942, Soviet forces began Operation Little Saturn during which the "Sforzesca" division was annihilated. On 1 January 1943, only about 300 men of the 53rd Infantry Regiment "Sforzesca" and 54th Infantry Regiment "Sforzesca" reached the new Axis lines at Belaya Kalitva. In March 1943, the few survivors of the division were repatriated. On 1 June 1943, the 2nd Infantry Division "Sforzesca" and its units were reformed by renaming the 157th Infantry Division "Novara" and that division's units. The new "Sforzesca" division was based in Divača, Sežana and Ilirska Bistrica along the border between Italy and Yugoslavia, where it performed anti-partisan duties. On 8 September 1943, the Armistice of Cassibile was announced and soon after the "Sforzesca" division and its units were disbanded by invading German forces.

For its conduct and sacrifice during Operation Little Saturn the 53rd Infantry Regiment "Sforzesca" was awarded a Gold Medal of Military Valor, which was affixed to the regiment's flag and added to the regiment's coat of arms.

=== Cold War ===
On 1 July 1963, the regiment's command was reformed in Ialmicco and designated 53rd Infantry Fortification Regiment "Umbria". The regiment consisted of a command, and command platoon, and received the existing XVI and XXI fortification battalions. The regiment was assigned to the Infantry Division "Folgore" and tasked with maintaining and manning the fortifications of the Alpine Wall between the lower Soča river and the Torre and Natisone rivers. On 18 August 1964, the XVI and XXI fortification battalions were reorganized as I, II, and III battalions. The regiment then consisted of the following units:

- 53rd Infantry Fortification Regiment "Umbria", in Ialmicco
  - Command and Services Company, in Ialmicco
  - I Battalion, in Pavia di Udine, with a detachment in Brazzano
  - II Battalion, in San Lorenzo Isontino, with detachments in Farra d'Isonzo and Lucinico
  - III Battalion, in Fogliano Redipuglia, with a detachment in Perteole

During the 1975 army reform, the army disbanded the regimental level and newly independent battalions were granted for the first time their own flags. On 30 September 1976, the 53rd Infantry Fortification Regiment "Umbria" was disbanded and the next day the regiment's I Battalion, II Battalion, and III Battalion became autonomous units and were renamed 53rd Infantry Fortification Battalion "Umbria", 63rd Infantry Fortification Battalion "Cagliari", and 33rd Infantry Fortification Battalion "Ardenza". The 53rd Infantry Fortification Battalion "Umbria" was based in Pavia di Udine and consisted of a command, a command and services company, and three fortification companies. On 12 November 1976, the President of the Italian Republic Giovanni Leone assigned with decree 846 the flag and traditions of the 53rd Infantry Regiment "Umbria" to the 53rd Infantry Fortification Battalion "Umbria".

The battalion was assigned to the Mechanized Division "Folgore" and tasked with manning fortifications of the Alpine Wall along the Natisone river, from Manzano to the Natisione's confluence with the Torre river, and along the Torre river from Pavia di Udine to Villesse. On 1 January 1980, the battalion formed a fourth fortification company.

In 1986 the Italian Army abolished the divisional level and brigades, which until then had been under one of the Army's four divisions, came under direct command of the Army's 3rd Army Corps or 5th Army Corps. On 31 October 1986, the Mechanized Division "Folgore" was disbanded and the next day the 53rd Infantry Fortification Battalion "Umbria" was assigned to the Mechanized Brigade "Gorizia".

=== Recent times ===
After the end of the Cold War Italian Army began to draw down its forces and on 31 December 1991, the 53rd Infantry Fortification Battalion "Umbria" was reduced in size and then consisted of a command, a command and services company, and a building maintenance Company. On 31 March 1993, the battalion was disbanded and the flag of the 53rd Infantry Regiment "Umbria" transferred to the Shrine of the Flags in the Vittoriano in Rome.
