= 17th Anti-aircraft Artillery Regiment "Sforzesca" =

Active Italian Army SHORAD air-defense unit

- 17° Reggimento Artiglieria Controaerei "Sforzesca"
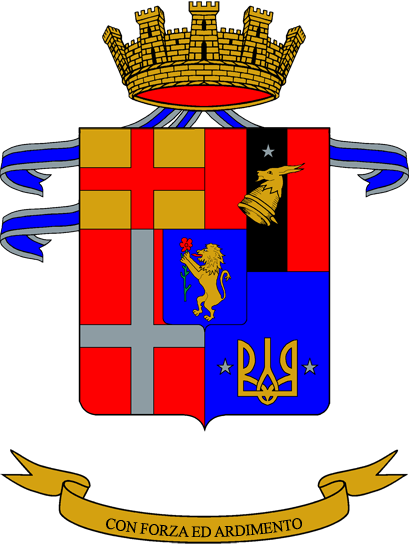
- Regimental coat of arms
- Active: 1 Nov. 1888 – 8 Sept. 1943; 1 Jan. 1947 – 31 Jan. 1964; 1 April 1964 – today
- Country: Italy
- Branch: Italian Army
- Part of: Anti-aircraft Artillery Command
- Garrison/HQ: Sabaudia
- Motto: "Con forza ed ardimento"
- Anniversaries: 15 June 1918 – Second Battle of the Piave River
- Decorations: 3× Silver Medals of Military Valor; 1× Gold Cross of Army Merit

Insignia
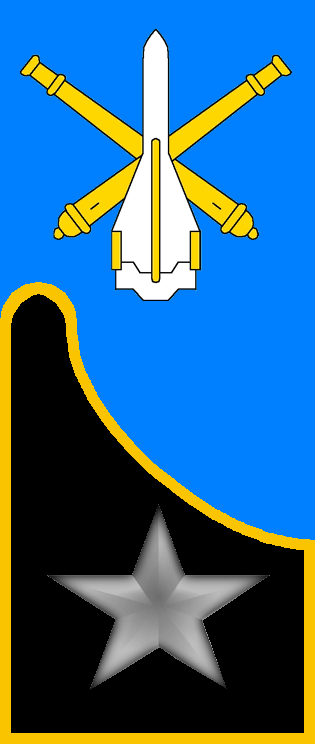
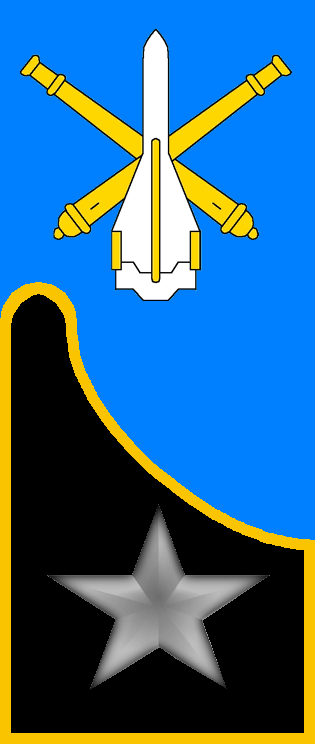
- Regimental gorget patches

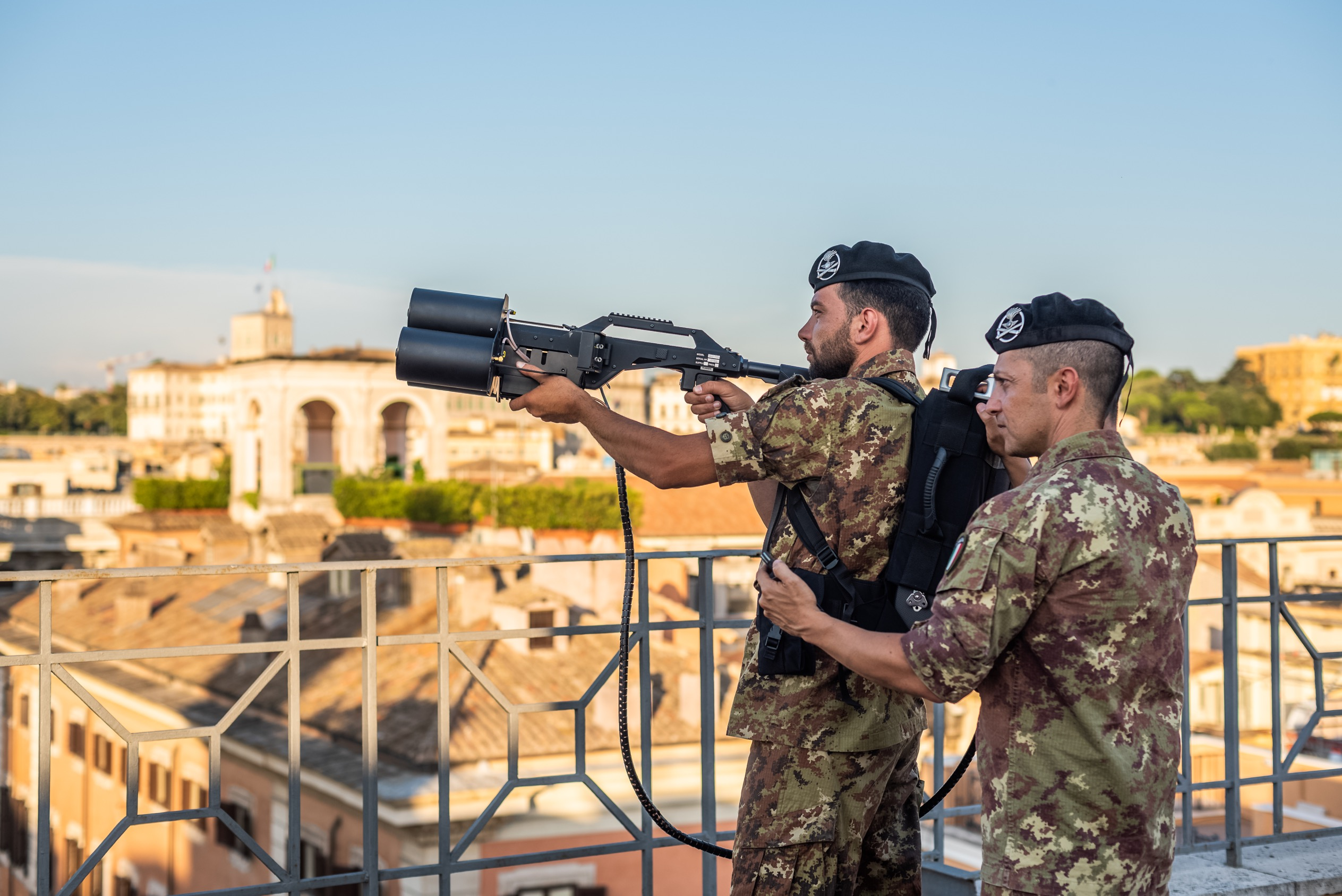
17th "Sforzesca" soldiers with a portable CPM-Drone Jammer

The 17th Anti-aircraft Artillery Regiment "Sforzesca" (Italian: 17° Reggimento Artiglieria Controaerei "Sforzesca") is an air defense regiment of the Italian Army. Originally an artillery regiment of the Royal Italian Army, the regiment fought on the Italian front in World War I, and was assigned in World War II to the 2nd Infantry Division "Sforzesca", with which the regiment was deployed to the Eastern Front, where division and regiment were destroyed during the Red Army's Operation Little Saturn. In 1947, the Italian Army reformed the regiment and, on 1 July 1953, the regiment was transferred from the field artillery to the anti-aircraft specialty. Today the regiment is based in Sabaudia in Lazio and assigned to the Anti-aircraft Artillery Command. The regiment's batteries are equipped with Skyguard surface-to-air missile systems respectively Stinger man-portable air-defense systems. The regiment's anniversary falls, as for all Italian Army artillery regiments, on June 15, the beginning of the Second Battle of the Piave River in 1918.

== History ==
On 1 November 1888, the Royal Italian Army formed the 17th Field Artillery Regiment in Novara. The new regiment consisted of eight batteries and one train company ceded by the 5th Field Artillery Regiment. The ceded batteries had participated in the First, the Second, the Sardinian campaign in central and Southern Italy in 1860–61, and the Third Italian War of Independence.

In 1895–96, the regiment formed the 1st Mountain Artillery battery for the First Italo-Ethiopian War. The battery deployed to Eritrea and fought in the Battle of Adwa. The regiment also provided 139 troops for other units deployed to East Africa for the war. In 1911–12, the regiment provided one group command and two batteries for the Italo-Turkish War. The regiment also provided 235 troops to augment other units deployed for the war.

On 29 February 1912, the regiment ceded its III Group, which consisted of three batteries, to help form the 25th Field Artillery Regiment, and in April of the same year the regiment provided personnel to help form the 1st Heavy Field Artillery Regiment.

=== World War I ===
At the outbreak of World War I the regiment was assigned, together with the Brigade "Como" and Brigade "Umbria", to the 2nd Division. At the time the regiment consisted of a command, three groups with a combined eight batteries equipped with 75/27 mod. 06 field guns, and a depot. In May 1915, the regiment formed with its reserve personnel one group of three batteries for the 41st Field Artillery. During the war the regiment's depot in Novara formed the command of the 14th Heavy Field Artillery Grouping, the commands of the X, XIII, XVII, XXXVIII, and CII heavy field howitzer groups, 17 heavy field howitzer batteries, and two siege batteries. In 1915, the regiment fought in the Dolomites on the Sass de Stria, Col di Lana, Monte Piana and at Schluderbach. From 5 to 13 September 1916, the regiment fought on the flanks of the Lagazuoi mountain on the Forcella Travenanzes. In August and September 1917, during the Eleventh Battle of the Isonzo, the regiment fought on Monte Santo and on Škabrijel. In November 1917, after the Italian defeat in the Battle of Caporetto and the following Italian retreat to the Piave river, the regiment defended the bridge over the Piave at Vidor. In June 1918, during the Second Battle of the Piave River, the regiment fought at Monastier and Fossalta. In October of the same year the regiment was again at Monastier during the Battle of Vittorio Veneto.

In 1920, the regiment moved from Novara to the newly annexed Monfalcone, where it remained only for one year before returning in 1921 to Novara. In 1926, the regiment was assigned to the 2nd Territorial Division of Novara. At the time the regiment consisted of a command, a group with 100/17 mod. 14 howitzers, two groups with 75/27 mod. 11 field guns, a group with mule-carried 75/13 mod. 15 mountain guns, and a depot. In 1934, the 2nd Territorial Division of Novara was renamed 2nd Infantry Division "Sforzesca" and consequently, the regiment was renamed 17th Artillery Regiment "Sforzesca". In 1935–36, the regiment provided eight officers and 150 enlisted to augment units deployed to East Africa for the Second Italo-Ethiopian War.

On 1 September 1939, the regiment's depot in Novara reformed the 59th Artillery Regiment "Cagliari" for the 59th Infantry Division "Cagliari". Two days later, on 3 September 1939, the 17th Artillery Regiment "Sforzesca" ceded one of its 75/27 mod. 11 groups to help reform the 36th Artillery Regiment "Forlì" for the 36th Infantry Division "Forlì".

=== World War II ===
On 10 June 1940, the day Italy entered World War II, the regiment consisted of a command, a command unit, a group with horse-drawn 100/17 mod. 14 howitzers, two groups with mule-carried 75/13 mod. 15 mountain guns, and an anti-aircraft battery with 20/65 mod. 35 anti-aircraft guns.

The June 1940, the 2nd Infantry Division "Sforzesca", which also included the 53rd Infantry Regiment "Sforzesca" and 54th Infantry Regiment "Sforzesca", participated in the Italian invasion of France. In January 1941, the division was sent to Albania to reinforce the crumbling Italian front in the Greco-Italian War. The division entered the front on 28 January and remained in heavy defensive fighting until 28 February. On 9 March 1941, the Italians began their spring offensive and the Sforzesca division advanced towards Bregu i Buzit. After the Battle of Greece the Sforzesca division remained on occupation duty in Greece until the middle of July 1941.

For its conduct and service on the Greek front from 13 February to 17 April 1941 the 17th Artillery Regiment "Sforzesca" was awarded a Silver Medal of Military Valor, which was affixed to the regiment's flag.

In spring 1942, the Sforzesca division was assigned to the Italian 8th Army, which was readied to be deployed in summer 1942 to the Eastern Front. Consequently, in April 1942, the 17th Artillery Regiment "Sforzesca" was reorganized in preparation for the division's deployment to the Eastern Front: on 10 April the regiment's depot in Novara formed the command and command unit of the 117th Artillery Regiment "Rovigo" for the 105th Infantry Division "Rovigo" and on 15 April the command and command unit of the 159th Artillery Regiment "Veneto" for the 159th Infantry Division "Veneto". The 17th Artillery Regiment "Sforzesca" then transferred its two groups with 75/13 mod. 15 mountain guns to the 159th Artillery Regiment "Veneto", which on 7 May 1942 ceded them to the 117th Artillery Regiment "Rovigo". As replacement the 17th Artillery Regiment "Sforzesca" received two groups with 75/18 mod. 35 howitzers, one of which arrived from the 108th Artillery Regiment "Cosseria", and a group with 105/28 cannons, which was transferred from the 1st Army Corps Artillery Regiment. The Sforzesca also formed a new anti-aircraft battery with 20/65 mod. 35 anti-aircraft guns.

In June 1942, the Sforzesca division arrived in Dnipropetrovsk Oblast in Ukraine, where it was assigned to the XXXV Army Corps. After arriving in the Soviet Union the 17th Artillery Regiment "Sforzesca" also received the 70th Anti-tank Battery with 75/39 anti-tank guns. In July 1942, the division participated in the capture of Khrustalnyi in Luhansk Oblast. In early August 1942, the division established a bridgehead on the eastern bank of the Don river and advanced along the Khopyor river to the village of Yarskoy 1-y. On 12 August 1942, the Sforzesca division was attacked by the Soviet 63rd Army, which consisted of the 197th Rifle Division, 203rd Rifle Division and 14th Guards Rifle Division. The Sforzesca division was forced give up the bridgehead and fall back to the villages of Yagodnyi and Chebotarevskii to the South of the Don river. While Chebotarevskii was overrun by Red Army forces, Yagodnyi held and on 21 August the remaining Italian troops counterattacked. On 24 August, the stronghold at Yagodnyi had run out of ammunition, but the Italian troops there were saved by the arrival of the 3rd Bersaglieri Regiment and 6th Bersaglieri Regiment of the 3rd Cavalry Division "Principe Amedeo Duca d'Aosta" and the German 79th Infantry Division.

For its conduct and service at Yagodnyi between 17 and 31 August 1942 the 17th Artillery Regiment "Sforzesca" was awarded a Silver Medal of Military Valor, which was affixed to the regiment's flag.

On 12 December 1942, Soviet forces began Operation Little Saturn during which the Sforzesca division was annihilated. On 1 January 1943, the few survivors of the division reached the new Axis lines at Belaya Kalitva. In March 1943, the division's remnants were repatriated and the few remaining troops of the 17th Artillery Regiment "Sforzesca" were assigned to the 157th Artillery Regiment "Novara" of the 157th Infantry Division "Novara". On 1 June 1943, the 2nd Infantry Division "Sforzesca" and its units were reformed by renaming the 157th Infantry Division "Novara" and that division's units. The new Sforzesca division was based in Divača, Sežana and Ilirska Bistrica along the border between Italy and Yugoslavia, where it performed anti-partisan duties. On 9 July 1943, the 17th Artillery Regiment "Sforzesca" was in Divača, where the regiment replaced the flag of the 157th Artillery Regiment "Novara" with its own flag, that the regiment's survivors had brought back from the Soviet Union.

For its conduct and sacrifice during Operation Little Saturn the 17th Artillery Regiment "Sforzesca" was awarded its third Silver Medal of Military Valor, which was affixed to the regiment's flag.

In the evening of 8 September 1943, the Armistice of Cassibile, which ended hostilities between the Kingdom of Italy and the Anglo-American Allies, was announced by General Dwight D. Eisenhower on Radio Algiers and by Marshal Pietro Badoglio on Italian radio. Germany reacted by invading Italy and the 17th Artillery Regiment "Sforzesca" was soon thereafter disbanded by German forces near Florence.

=== Cold War ===
On 1 January 1947, the Italian Army reformed the regiment as 17th Field Artillery Regiment in Novara, with the personnel and materiel of the III and IV groups of the 7th Field Artillery Regiment. The reformed regiment was assigned to the Infantry Division "Cremona" and consisted of a command, a command unit, and two groups with British QF 25-pounder field guns. In August of the same year, the regiment formed the III Group with QF 25-pounder field guns.

On 1 January 1951, the Infantry Division "Cremona" included the following artillery regiments:

- Infantry Division "Cremona", in Turin
  - 7th Field Artillery Regiment, in Turin
  - 17th Field Artillery Regiment, in Novara
  - 52nd Anti-tank Field Artillery Regiment, in Acqui
  - 1st Light Anti-aircraft Artillery Regiment, in Albenga

On 1 July 1951, the 1st Light Anti-aircraft Artillery Regiment was reorganized as 1st Heavy Anti-aircraft Artillery Regiment and transferred its II Light Anti-aircraft Group with 40/56 autocannons to the 17th Field Artillery Regiment, which renumbered the group as IV Group. On 1 September of the same year, the III Group with QF 25-pounder field guns was disbanded.

On 30 June 1953, the regiment moved from Novara to Lodi, where it was reformed as 17th D.A.T. Anti-aircraft Artillery Grouping. The D.A.T. (Italian: Difesa Area Territoriale or Territorial Area Defense) units were tasked with the air defense of Italian cities. The grouping consisted initially of a command, a command unit, and the II Group with 90/53 anti-aircraft guns in Anzio, which moved on 27 September 1953 from Anzio to Lodi. In 1954, the grouping formed the III Group with 90/53 anti-aircraft guns in Lodi and the I Group with 90/50 M1 anti-aircraft guns in Milan. On 31 December 1955, the organization of the grouping was changed: its three groups were renumbered X, XI, and XII, and the XI (former II Group) exchanged its 90/50 M1 anti-aircraft guns for 90/53 anti-aircraft guns. On the same date, the regiment formed the CCIV and CCVII light anti-aircraft groups with 40/56 autocannons. However the CCIV Light Anti-aircraft Group existed only on paper as only the 813th Battery had been formed for the group, but not a group command or the group's other batteries.

On 10 December 1957, the CCVII Group moved to Ghedi Air Base. On 22 December 1958, the command of the CCIV Group was formed and took command of the 813th Battery. On 8 April 1961, the CCIV Group received the 805th Battery from the 2nd D.A.T. Anti-aircraft Artillery Grouping. On 30 April of the same year, 17th D.A.T. Anti-aircraft Artillery Grouping transferred its groups to the 2nd D.A.T. Anti-aircraft Artillery Grouping in Savona. The next day, on 1 May 1961, the 2nd D.A.T. Anti-aircraft Artillery Grouping was disbanded and the 17th D.A.T. Anti-aircraft Artillery Grouping transferred its flag from Lodi to Savona, where the command of the disbanded grouping was renamed 17th D.A.T. Anti-aircraft Artillery Grouping. Afterwards the grouping consisted of a command, a command unit, three groups equipped with 90/53 anti-aircraft guns (the IV Group in Savona, V Group in Savona, and X Group in Lodi), and two groups with 40mm L/70 autocannons (the CCIV Group in Lodi and CCVII Group at Ghedi Air Base).

On 1 October 1962, the grouping was renamed 17th Anti-aircraft Artillery Grouping and assigned to the Anti-aircraft Artillery Command. On 31 January 1964, the 17th Anti-aircraft Artillery Grouping and its three heavy groups were disbanded. The next day the CCIV and CCVII groups were assigned to the 3rd Anti-aircraft Artillery Grouping in Bologna, which was renamed on the same day 3rd Light Anti-aircraft Artillery Regiment and now consisted of four heavy groups and four light groups. On 31st March of the same year, the 3rd Light Anti-aircraft Artillery Regiment and its VIII Group with 90/50 M1 anti-aircraft guns were disbanded. The next day, on 1 April 1964, the command of the disbanded regiment was renamed 17th Light Anti-aircraft Artillery Regiment. The regiment consisted of the following units:

- 17th Anti-aircraft Artillery Regiment, in Bologna
  - Command Unit
  - I Light Anti-aircraft Group with 40mm L/70 autocannons (former CCV Group in Villafranca)
  - II Light Anti-aircraft Group with 40mm L/70 autocannons (former CCVI Group at Istrana Air Base)
  - III Light Anti-aircraft Group with 40mm L/70 autocannons (former CCIV Group in Lodi)
  - IV Light Anti-aircraft Group with 40mm L/70 autocannons (former CCVII Group at Ghedi Air Base)
  - VI Heavy Anti-aircraft Group with 90/50 M1 anti-aircraft guns
  - VII Heavy Anti-aircraft Group with 90/50 M1 anti-aircraft guns
  - IX Heavy Anti-aircraft Group with 90/50 M1 anti-aircraft guns

On 31 August 1964, the VI and VII groups were disbanded, while the IX Group was transferred to the 121st Heavy Anti-aircraft Artillery Regiment the next day.

In 1972, the regiment moved from Bologna to Brescia. On 1 February 1973, the III Group in Lodi was disbanded. During the 1975 army reform the army disbanded the regimental level and newly independent battalions were granted for the first time their own flags, respectively in the case of cavalry units, their own standard. On 31 October 1975, the 17th Light Anti-aircraft Artillery Regiment was disbanded and the next day the regiment's I Light Anti-aircraft Group in Villafranca was reorganized and renamed 17th Light Anti-aircraft Artillery Group "Sforzesca". Subsequently, all of the regiment's remaining groups were reduced to batteries, which were assigned to the 17th Light Anti-aircraft Artillery Group "Sforzesca". After the reform the group fielded 471 men (24 officers, 89 non-commissioned officers, and 358 soldiers).

On 12 November 1976, the President of the Italian Republic Giovanni Leone assigned with decree 846 the flag and traditions of the 17th Light Anti-aircraft Artillery Regiment to the 17th Light Anti-aircraft Artillery Group "Sforzesca". After the reform the group consisted now of the following units:

- 17th Light Anti-aircraft Artillery Group "Sforzesca", in Villafranca
  - Command and Services Battery, in Villafranca
  - 1st Light Anti-aircraft Artillery Battery, at Villafranca Air Base
  - 2nd Light Anti-aircraft Artillery Battery, at Ghedi Air Base
  - 3rd Light Anti-aircraft Artillery Battery, at Istrana Air Base

In 1993, the batteries were disbanded: the 2nd Battery on 15 September, the 3rd Battery on 15 November, and the 1st Battery on 15 December. One day earlier, on 14 December, the 2nd Light Anti-aircraft Group in Mestre had left the 121st Light Anti-aircraft Artillery Regiment, and, on 15 December 1993, that group was renamed 17th Light Anti-aircraft Artillery Group "Sforzesca". On 17 September 1995, the 17th Light Anti-aircraft Artillery Group "Sforzesca" lost its autonomy and the next day the group entered the reformed 17th Anti-aircraft Artillery Regiment. On the same day, the flag and traditions of the 17th Anti-aircraft Artillery Regiment were transferred from the battalion to the reformed regiment. The reformed regiment's 1st Anti-aircraft Group consisted of three batteries, which were equipped with Skyguard surface-to-air missile systems and Stinger man-portable air-defense systems.

=== Recent times ===
On 30 June 1997, the 18th Anti-aircraft Artillery Regiment in Rimini was disbanded and the regiment's flag transferred the next day to the Shrine of the Flags in the Vittoriano in Rome for safekeeping. On the same day, 1 July 1997, the flag of the 17th Anti-aircraft Artillery Regiment "Sforzesca" was moved from Villafranca to Rimini, where the 17th Anti-aircraft Artillery Regiment "Sforzesca" took over the base and units of the disbanded regiment.

On 1 January 2002, the regiment was assigned to the Anti-aircraft Artillery Brigade. In October 2002, the command of the 17th Anti-aircraft Artillery Regiment "Sforzesca" in Rimini moved to Sabaudia and the regiment's anti-aircraft group in Rimini was assigned to the 121st Anti-aircraft Artillery Regiment "Ravenna" as 2nd Anti-aircraft Group. On 11 September 2009, the Anti-aircraft Artillery Brigade was merged with the Anti-aircraft Artillery School to form the Anti-aircraft Artillery Command.

== Organization ==
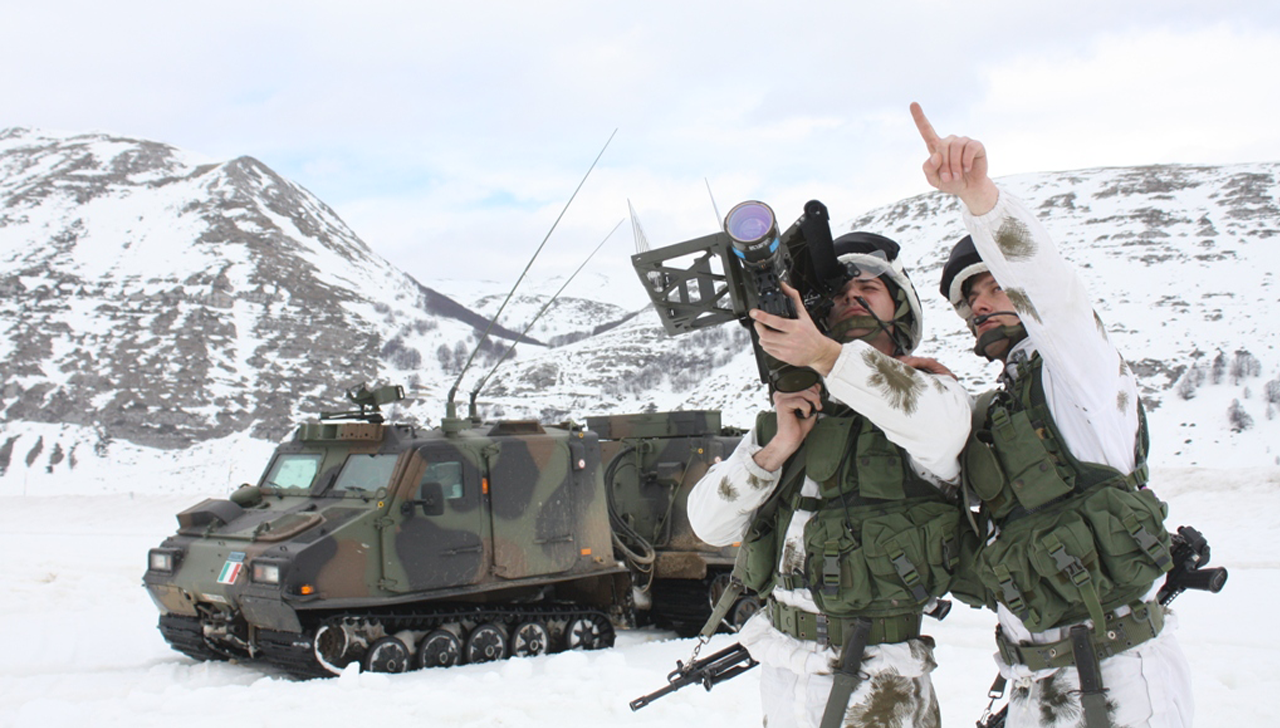
17th Anti-aircraft Artillery Regiment "Sforzesca" FIM-92 Stinger team during an exercise 2015

As of 2025 the 17th Anti-aircraft Artillery Regiment "Sforzesca" is organized as follows:

- 17th Anti-aircraft Artillery Regiment "Sforzesca", in Sabaudia
  - Command and Logistic Support Battery
  - Signal Company
  - SHORAD/VSHORAD Group
    - 1st Skyguard Battery
    - 2nd Skyguard Battery
    - 3rd Stinger Battery
    - 4th Stinger Battery
    - Fire Control and Support Battery

The regiment's Skyguard surface-to-air missile systems will be replaced by Grifo systems with CAMM-ER surface-to-air missiles in 2026. The 17th Anti-aircraft Artillery Regiment "Sforzesca" contributes two Stinger batteries to the Italian military's National Sea Projection Capability (Italian: Forza di proiezione dal mare), which consists of the Italian Army's Cavalry Brigade "Pozzuolo del Friuli" and the Italian Navy's 3rd Naval Division and San Marco Marine Brigade.
