= 2nd Infantry Division "Sforzesca" =

Royal Italian Army formation during World War II

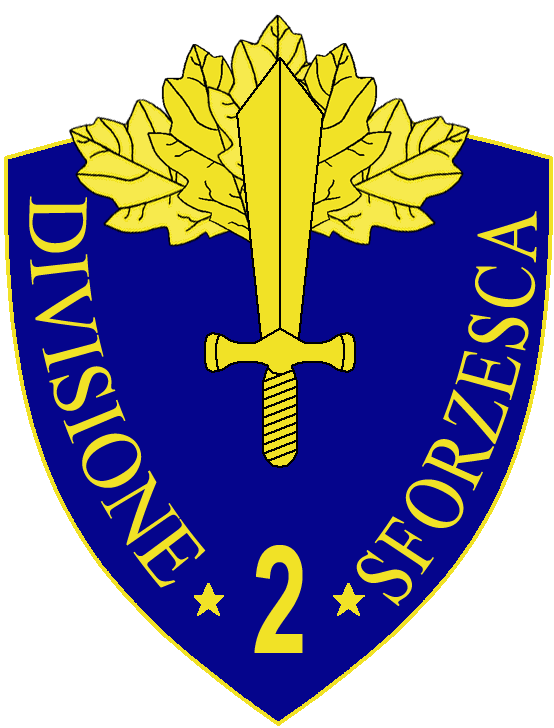
- 2nd Infantry Division "Sforzesca" insignia
- Active: 1940 - 1943
- Disbanded: 1943
- Country: Kingdom of Italy
- Branch: Royal Italian Army
- Role: Infantry
- Size: Division
- Garrison/HQ: Novara, Italy
- Engagements: World War II: Battle of France; Greco-Italian War; Eastern Front; Yugoslav Front

Insignia
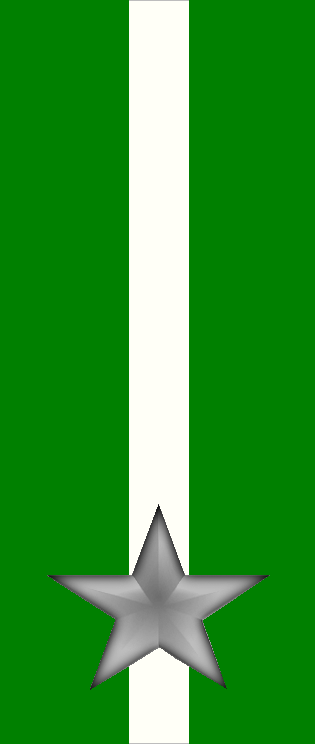
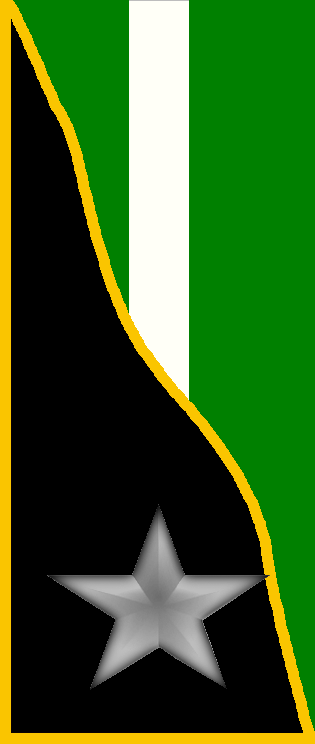
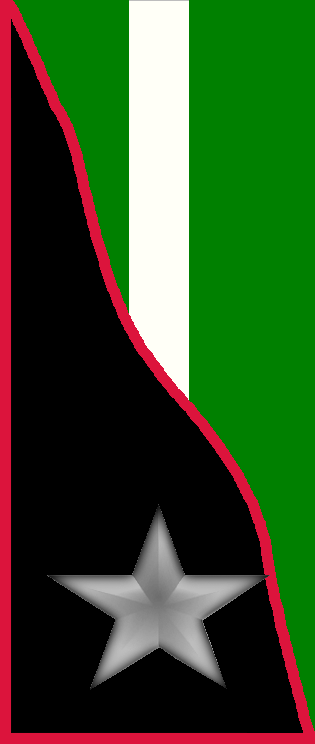
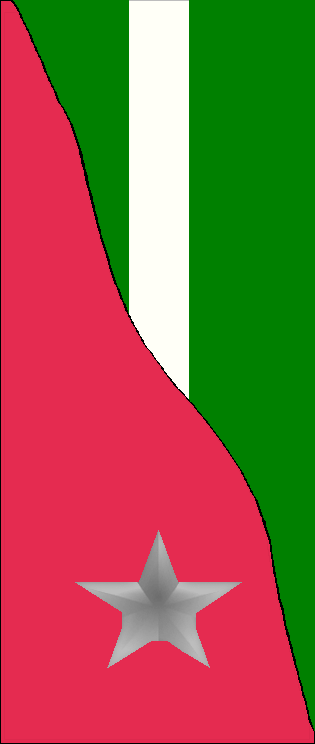
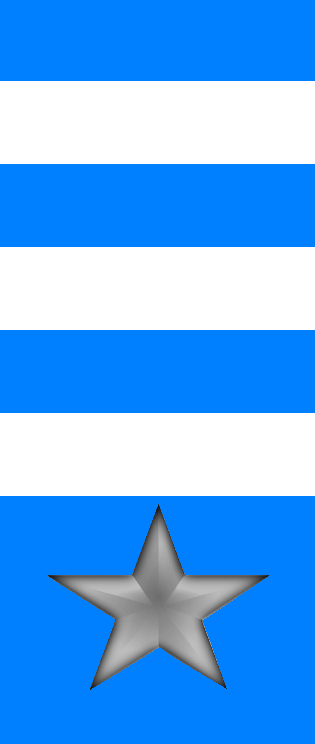
- Identification symbol: Sforzesca Division gorget patches

The 2nd Infantry Division "Sforzesca" (Italian: 2ª Divisione di fanteria "Sforzesca") was an infantry division of the Royal Italian Army during World War II. The Sforzesca was a mountain-type infantry division, which meant that the division's artillery and logistics were moved by pack mules, while in standard infantry divisions artillery and logistics were moved by horse-drawn limbers and carriages. Italy's real mountain warfare divisions were the six alpine divisions manned by Alpini troops. The Division, with the exception of the 53rd Infantry Regiment based in Biella, was based in Novara and recruited its troops primarily from northern Piedmont. The division was named for the Battle of Sforzesca fought during the First Italian War of Independence in 1849.

== History ==
The division's lineage begins with the Brigade "Umbria" established in Palermo on 16 April 1861 with the 53rd and 54th infantry regiments.

=== World War I ===
The brigade fought on the Italian front in World War I. On 1 October 1926 the brigade assumed the name of II Infantry Brigade and received the 68th Infantry Regiment "Palermo" from the disbanded Brigade "Palermo". The brigade was the infantry component of the 2nd Territorial Division of Novara, which also included the 17th Artillery Regiment. In 1934 the division changed its name to 2nd Infantry Division "Sforzesca". On 25 April 1939 the II Infantry Brigade was dissolved and the three infantry regiments came under direct command of the division, and the 53rd and 54th infantry regiments and 17th Artillery Regiment changed their names to "Sforzesca". On 24 May 1939 the division ceded the 68th Infantry Regiment "Palermo" to the newly activated 58th Infantry Division "Legnano".

=== World War II ===
==== Invasion of France ====
The Sforzesca participated in the invasion of France operating between Claviere and Cesana Torinese. It spearheaded the attack in the direction of Briançon, but encountered heavy French resistance. On 22 June 1940 the area around the Fort Bois de Praria was secured, and fighting shifted to Bois de Sestriere, with the capture of Montgenèvre commune. On the southern flank, the advance stalled at La Crete (Crete de Chaussard). On 23 June 23 the Sforzesca has made a very modest advance. In the night of 23 to 24 June 1940 the Sforzesca was transferred to the reserve and replaced by the 58th Infantry Division "Legnano".

==== Greco-Italian War ====
During the Greco-Italian War the Sforzesca was sent as reinforcement to Albania between 12–18 January 1941. There the 30th CC.NN. Legion was attached to the division, which entered the front in the area of Tepelenë. The Sforzesca had its first encounter with Greek army forces on 28 January on the ridge over Mali i Shendellise (Scindeli). The heavy defensive fighting, with frequent hand-to-hand combat and positions lost and recaptured several times, continued until 28 February. During the Italian offensive on 1 March 1941, the Sforzesca captured Chiaf and by 4 March had moved to Bregu i Buzit. After the Battle of Greece the Sforzesca remained in on occupation duty in Greece until the middle of July 1941.

==== Eastern Front ====
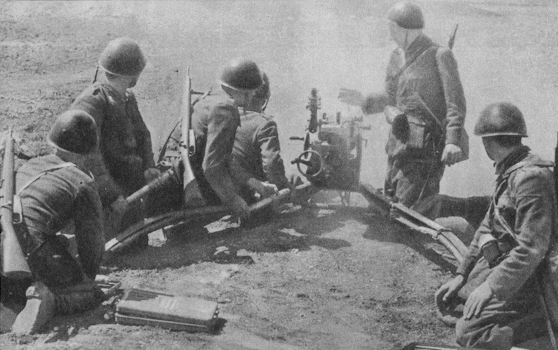
Men of the 'Sforzesca' division in action on the Russian front

The Sforzesca was one of the ten Italian divisions of the Italian Army in Russia, which fought on the Eastern Front. After arriving in Ukraine the division was assigned to XXXV Army Corps and participated in the capture of the Ivanovka positions in Dnipropetrovsk Oblast. On 14 July 1942 the Sforzesca reached Fashchivka in Luhansk Oblast. By 18 July 1942 the Sforzesca division started mop-up operation near Krasnyi Luch. At beginning of August 1942 the division marched to the area north of Serafimovich, establishing a bridgehead on the eastern bank of the Don river up to Khutor of Yarskoy 1-y. Together with 3rd Cavalry Division "Principe Amedeo Duca d'Aosta", the Sforzesca beat off several Soviet attacks between 12 August 1942 and 1 September 1942. On 20 August, it fell under heavy direct attack by the Soviet 63rd Army, with 197th Rifle Division, 203rd Rifle Division and 14th Guards Rifle Division attacking from both sides of Yelanskaya, establishing a shortlived bridgehead across the Don river. The Soviets were able to expand their bridgehead until eventually stopped on 28 August by the Sforzesca, the 3rd Cavalry Division and the German 79th Infantry Division.

Although Soviet attacks were stopped, the Italians were unable to resume their offensive or expand their bridgehead as a result. After repositioning on the southern bank of the Don, the Sforzesca was assigned to the Romanian 3rd Army, along with the 9th Infantry Division "Pasubio" and 3rd Cavalry Division "Principe Amedeo Duca d'Aosta". The Sforzesca was under heavy Soviet attacks from 20 November until 28 November 1942.

==== Operation Little Saturn ====
On 12 December 1942 Soviet forces began Operation Little Saturn and on 22 December large columns of Soviet tanks overran the Sforzesca and part of the division was destroyed, largely as a result of conflicting German orders, that caught the Italian division advancing forward near Verkhne-Chirskoy, when it should've been retreating to the new German defensive line near the Chir River. The remnants of the Sforzesca fought a defensive battle in the village of Kranoyarovka, Rostov Oblast from 25 December 1942 until 28 December 1942. The division suffered heavy losses in January 1943, and the remaining units managed to break through the encirclement by the Soviet 1st Guards Army on 3 January 1943. The remnants of the division were repatriated in March 1943.

==== Italy ====
The Sforzesca and its units were disbanded in on 31 May 1943, but on 1 June 1943 the division was reformed with its traditional units by renaming the 157th Infantry Division "Novara" and that division's units. The new Sforzesca was based in Divača, Sežana and Ilirska Bistrica along the border between Italy and Yugoslavia, where it performed anti-partisan duties. After the announcement of the Armistice of Cassibile on 8 September 1943 the remnants of the Sforzesca surrendered to invading German forces on 9 September 1943.

== Organization ==
2nd Infantry Division "Sforzesca" organization in 1940

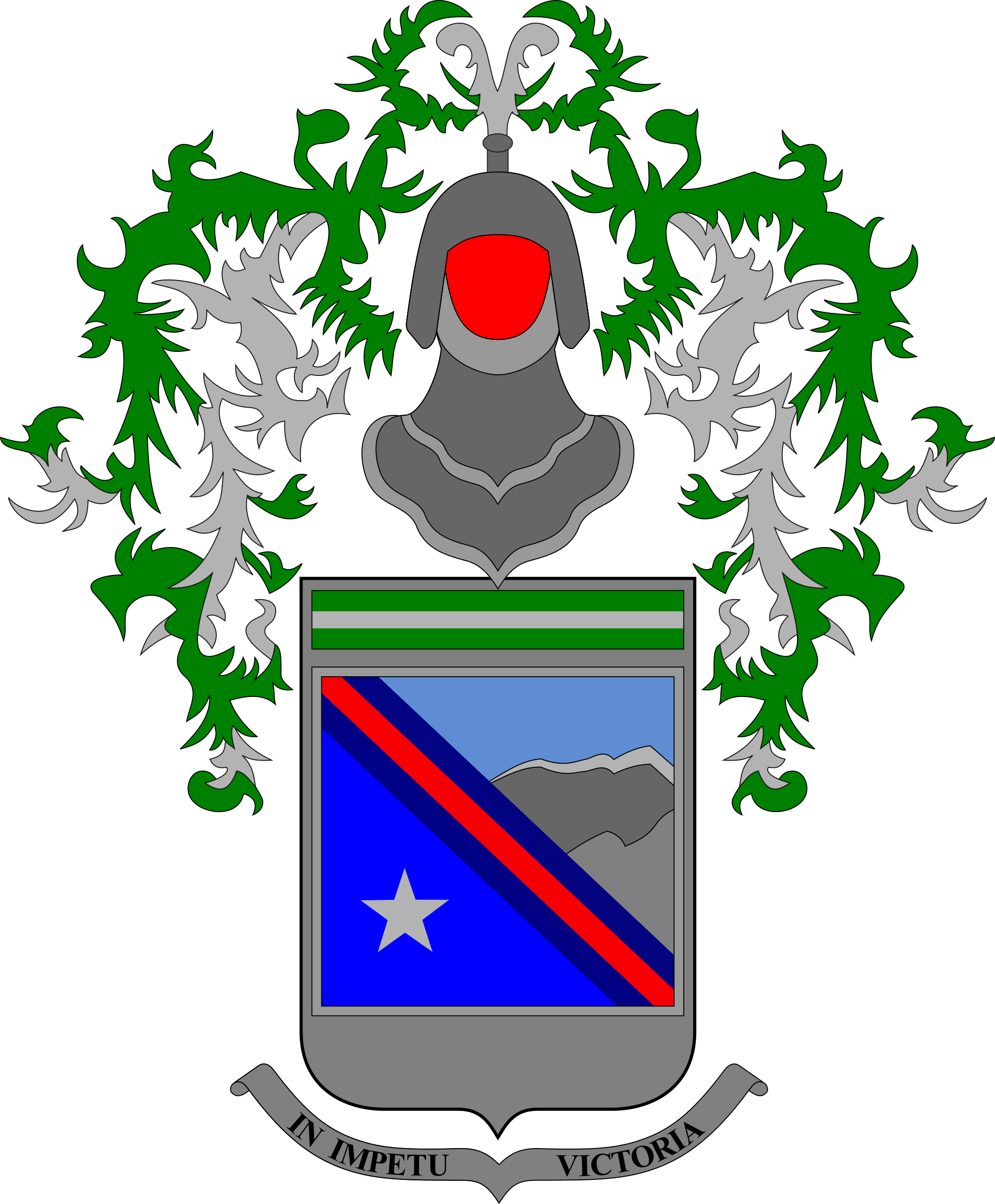
Coat of Arms of the 54th Infantry Regiment "Umbria", 1939

When the division was deployed to the Soviet Union it consisted of the following units:

- 2nd Infantry Division "Sforzesca", in Novara
  - Headquarters
    - Command Company
    - 4th Carabinieri Section
    - 5th Carabinieri Section
    - 69th Field Post Office
    - 2nd Infantry Division Command Transport Squad
  - 53rd Infantry Regiment "Sforzesca", (Note: Named 53rd Infantry Regiment "Umbria" until 1939 when the army reorganized its divisions as binary divisions and divisional infantry regiments took the name of the division.) in Biella
    - Command Company
    - 3 × Fusilier battalions
    - Support Weapons Battery (65/17 mod. 13 infantry support guns)
    - Mortar Company (81mm mod. 35 mortars)
  - 54th Infantry Regiment "Sforzesca", (Note: Named 54th Infantry Regiment "Umbria" until 1939 when the army reorganized its divisions as binary divisions and divisional infantry regiments took the name of the division.) in Novara
    - Command Company
    - 3 × Fusilier battalions
    - Support Weapons Battery (65/17 mod. 13 infantry support guns)
    - Mortar Company (81mm mod. 35 mortars)
  - 17th Artillery Regiment "Sforzesca", in Novara
    - Command Unit
    - I Group (100/17 mod. 14 howitzers; transferred on 10 April 1942 to the 117th Artillery Regiment "Rovigo")
    - II Group (75/13 mod. 15 mountain guns; transferred on 10 April 1942 to the 117th Artillery Regiment "Rovigo")
    - III Group (75/13 mod. 15 mountain guns; transferred on 10 April 1942 to the 117th Artillery Regiment "Rovigo")
    - I Group (105/28 cannons; transferred in April 1942 from the 1st Army Corps Artillery Regiment)
    - II Group (75/18 mod. 35 mountain guns; formed in April 1942)
    - III Group (75/18 mod. 35 mountain guns; transferred in April 1942 from the 108th Artillery Regiment "Cosseria")
    - 70th Anti-tank Battery (75/39 anti-tank guns; attached during the deployment in the Soviet Union)
    - 53rd Anti-aircraft Battery (20/65 mod. 35 anti-aircraft guns)
    - 302nd Anti-aircraft Battery (20/65 mod. 35 anti-aircraft guns; formed in April 1942)
    - Ammunition and Supply Unit
  - II Mortar Battalion (81mm mod. 35 mortars)
  - 2nd Anti-tank Company (47/32 mod. 35 anti-tank guns)
  - 121st Anti-tank Company (47/32 mod. 35 anti-tank guns; attached for the deployment to the Soviet Union)
  - 2nd Telegraph and Radio Operators Company
  - 16th Engineer Company
  - 1st Supply Section (expanded to 1st Supply Unit for the deployment to the Soviet Union)
  - 6th Medical Section
    - 5th Field Hospital
    - 6th Field Hospital
    - 7th Field Hospital
    - 805th Field Hospital
    - 27th Surgical Unit
  - 2nd Autocarrette Section
  - 124th Transport Section
  - 192nd Transport Section (attached for the deployment to the Soviet Union)

Attached from 27 December 1940 to April 1942:

- 30th CC.NN. Legion "Oddone"
  - Command Company
  - VI CC.NN. Battalion
  - XXX CC.NN. Battalion
  - 30th CC.NN. Machine Gun Company

After the division reconstitution through the renaming of the 157th Infantry Division "Novara" the new Sforzesca inherited the following units from the Novara:

- CLVII Machine Gun Battalion
- CLVII Mixed Engineer Battalion
- 157th Medical Section
- 157th Carabinieri Section
- 157th Field Post Office

== Military honors ==
For their conduct during the campaign in the Soviet Union the President of Italy awarded on 31 December 1947 to the two infantry regiments of the 2nd Infantry Division "Sforzesca" Italy's highest military honor, the Gold Medal of Military Valor.

- 53rd Infantry Regiment "Sforzesca" on 31 December 1947
- 54th Infantry Regiment "Sforzesca" on 31 December 1947

== Commanding officers ==
The division's commanding officers were:

- Generale di Divisione Fidenzio Dall'Ora (1935 - 20 April 1938)
- Generale di Divisione Luigi Mentasti (21 April 1938 - 7 September 1939)
- Generale di Divisione Alfonso Ollearo (8 September 1939 - 28 June 1941)
- Generale di Divisione Carlo Pellegrini (29 June 1941 - 15 February 1943)
- Generale di Brigata Michele Vaccaro (acting: 16 February 1943 - 28 June 1943; official: 29 June 1943 - 9 September 1943)
