= 159th Brigade =

159th Brigade may refer to:

== Ukraine ==
- 159th Mechanized Brigade

== United Kingdom ==
- 159th (Cheshire) Brigade
- 159th Infantry Brigade (United Kingdom)

== United States ==
- 159th Combat Aviation Brigade

== See also ==
- 159th Division (disambiguation)
- 159th Regiment (disambiguation)
