= Michele Vaccaro =

Italian general

- Born: 21 December 1887; Agrigento, Kingdom of Italy
- Died: 1980 (age 92); Rome, Italy
- Military career
- Allegiance: Kingdom of Italy
- Branch: Royal Italian Army
- Rank: Brigadier General
- Commands: 23rd Infantry Regiment "Como"; Central Infantry School; 2nd Infantry Division "Sforzesca"
- Conflicts: Italo-Turkish War; First Italo-Senussi War; World War I; Battles of the Isonzo; World War II; Italian campaign on the Eastern Front; Operation Little Saturn; Operation Achse
- Awards: Silver Medal of Military Valor (three times); War Cross for Military Valor; War Merit Cross; Military Order of Savoy; Order of the Crown of Italy; Colonial Order of the Star of Italy; Order of Saints Maurice and Lazarus; Iron Cross First Class; Iron Cross Second Class

Michele Vaccaro (21 December 1887 – 1980) was an Italian general during World War II.

== Biography ==
He was born in Agrigento on 21 December 1887 to Alfonso Vaccaro and Giuseppina Lupo. After enlisting in the Royal Italian Army, he was commissioned as infantry second lieutenant on 21 October 1909. He fought in Libya during the Italo-Turkish War and the First Italo-Senussi War with the 57th Infantry Regiment "Abruzzi", earning a Silver Medal of Military Valor for having distinguished himself in the battle of Ettangi (Cyrenaica) on 18 June 1913. From 1915, he took part in the First World War in the ranks of the 71st Infantry Regiment of the "Puglie" Infantry Brigade, earning another Silver Medal for having saved the life of his regimental commander on the Hermada on 4 June 1917 and being promoted to the rank of major in the same year. In 1916 he had a son, Giuseppe (who would also pursue a military career, eventually becoming general and commander of Allied Forces Southern Europe from 1977 to 1979).

After the war, he remained in service with the 71st Infantry Regiment in Venice (where he also served as a judge at the local military tribunal) until, on 1 March 1923, he was assigned to the 59th Infantry Regiment "Calabria", stationed in Sardinia. He was promoted to lieutenant colonel on February 2, 1927. From 11 June 1933, he was in service at the Central Infantry School in Rome, and then at the Ministry of War, until 15 February 1937, when he became commander of the 23rd Infantry Regiment "Como" in Gorizia and remained there until late 1939. After a period at the VIII Army Corps in Rome, from 28 June 1940 to February 1942, he commanded the Central Infantry School.

On 1 January 1942, he was promoted to brigadier general. In the summer of 1942, he was placed in command of the 2nd Infantry Division "Sforzesca", and then was deployed on the Don river of the Eastern Front under the command of General Carlo Pellegrini. In August 1942, he received his third Silver Medal for his role in repelling a Soviet attack on the Don. After Operation Little Saturn and the subsequent general retreat of the 8th Army, he had the interim command of the depleted "Sforzesca" from 15 February 1943, with which he returned to Italy and was stationed in the Julian March between Sežana and Ilirska Bistrica. In June 1943, the "Sforzesca" was merged with the 157th Infantry Division "Novara". After the armistice of Cassibile, he was captured by the Germans in Fiume and interned in Oflag 64/Z in Schokken until he accepted to pledge allegiance to the Italian Social Republic, and was therefore repatriated. He did not, however, take any active role within the RSI. He died in Rome in 1980.
