= Mashchenko =

Mashchenko (Ukrainian: Мащенко) is a Ukrainian surname. Notable people with the surname include:

- Danyl Mashchenko (born 2002), Ukrainian footballer
- Ivan Mashchenko (1895–1941), Red Army colonel
- Oleksandr Mashchenko (born 1985), Ukrainian Paralympic swimmer
- Ruslan Mashchenko (born 1971), Russian hurdler and sprinter
- Vadym Mashchenko (born 2000), Ukrainian footballer
