= 159th Division =

159th Division may refer to:

- 159th Division (People's Republic of China)
- 159th Infantry Division (Wehrmacht), Germany
- 159th Infantry Division "Veneto", Italy
- 159th Rifle Division (1940–1941), Soviet Union
- 159th Rifle Division (1942–1943), Soviet Union
- 159th Rifle Division (1943–1946), Soviet Union

== See also ==
- List of military divisions by number
- 159th Brigade (disambiguation)
- 159th Regiment (disambiguation)
- 159th (disambiguation)
