= Mikhail Anashkin =

Soviet Hero

Mikhail Borisovich Anashkin
- Anashkin, 1945–1946
- Native name: Михаил Борисович Анашкин
- Born: 19 November 1901; Koma, Yeniseysk Governorate, Russian Empire
- Died: 23 January 1951 (aged 49) Moscow, Soviet Union
- Buried: Novodevichy Cemetery
- Allegiance: Russian SFSR; Soviet Union
- Branch: Red Army
- Service years: 1920–1938; 1939–1946
- Rank: Lieutenant general
- Commands: 160th Rifle Division; 159th Rifle Division (became 61st Guards Rifle Division); 19th Rifle Corps; 33rd Rifle Corps; 64th Rifle Corps; 129th Rifle Corps
- Conflicts: Russian Civil War; Polish–Soviet War; Sino-Soviet conflict; World War II
- Awards: Hero of the Soviet Union; Order of Lenin (2); Order of the Red Banner (4); Order of Kutuzov, 1st class; Order of Bogdan Khmelnitsky, 1st class; Order of Suvorov, 2nd class

Mikhail Borisovich Anashkin (Russian: Михаи́л Бори́сович Ана́шкин; 19 November 1901 – 23 January 1951) was a Red Army lieutenant general and a Hero of the Soviet Union.

Rising to junior command positions during the Russian Civil War, Anashkin held command and staff positions. He was arrested during the Great Purge but released, and after Operation Barbarossa began became a division chief of staff. He commanded the 160th Rifle Division from late 1941 to mid-1942 and the 159th Rifle Division in the Battle of Stalingrad. The latter was converted into the 61st Guards for its actions and Anashkin rose to corps command, leading the 19th, 33rd, and 64th Rifle Corps until early 1944. For the rest of the war, he commanded the 129th Rifle Corps, and was made a Hero of the Soviet Union for his leadership of it in the Vistula–Oder Offensive during early 1945. Ill health resulted in his early retirement after the end of the war.

== Early life and Russian Civil War ==
Anashkin was born to a peasant family on 19 November 1901 in the village of Koma, Yeniseysk Governorate, and completed primary school. He joined the partisan detachment of Pyotr Shchetinkin in November 1919 during the Russian Civil War and operated with it in Yeniseysk Governorate. When partisan detachments were reorganized into regular Red Army units in March 1920, Anashkin continued his service with the 239th Kursk Rifle Regiment of the 27th Omsk Rifle Division. After graduating from the divisional school, he served with the 239th as a squad leader and starshina. With the 5th Army of the Eastern Front, Anashkin fought in battles against the remnants of White forces.

In late June the division was relocated to the Western Front and as part of the 16th Army fought in the Polish–Soviet War on the Berezina in the area of Smolevichi and Ozerishche. On 11 July the 27th captured Minsk, then fought in the breakthrough of the fortified positions at Baranovichi, the capture of Slonim, and the crossing of the Bug. In August the division fought in the Battle of Warsaw before retreating back into Belarus. From January 1921, Anashkin served as a platoon commander and acting company commander with the 239th in fighting against anti-Soviet forces in Vitebsk, Minsk, and Gomel Governorates, and in March he participated in the suppression of the Kronstadt rebellion, then in the suppression of anti-Soviet forces in the Volga Military District.

== Interwar period ==
Anashkin served as a starshina in the 6th Tsaritsyn Regiment of the Volga Military District from May 1922, then in the same position with the 96th and 99th Rifle Regiments. From June 1924 he commanded a platoon in the 99th Regiment, before being sent to study at the Smolensk Infantry School in September. After the latter was disbanded in September 1926 Anashkin transferred to the Ryazan Infantry School. Upon his graduation in October 1927, he was appointed a platoon commander in the 66th Rifle Regiment of the 22nd Rifle Division. Anashkin completed the Moscow Military-Political Course between October 1928 and July 1929, being appointed commander and politruk of a company of the 78th Rifle Regiment of the 26th Rifle Division of the Special Far Eastern Army, with which he fought in the Sino-Soviet conflict later that year.

Transferred to the 118th Rifle Regiment of the 40th Rifle Division in June 1931, Anashkin served with it as a company politruk, company commander, and assistant chief of staff of the training battalion. Sent to study at the Frunze Military Academy for advanced training in February 1932, Anashkin was appointed assistant chief of the 1st (operational) department of the staff of the 7th Rifle Corps in the Kiev Military District upon his graduation in May 1936. He served as chief of staff of the 23rd Rifle Division from May 1937, but was arrested on 1 August 1938 during the Great Purge. Imprisoned under investigation until 27 February 1939, Anashkin was released and reinstated in the army, becoming an instructor at the tactics and staff service department of the Frunze Military Academy in April.

== World War II ==
After Operation Barbarossa began, Anashkin, now a lieutenant colonel, was appointed chief of staff of the 282nd Rifle Division, forming in the Moscow Military District, in July 1941. With the division, he went to the Bryansk Front and fought in battles in the area of Pochep and Trubchevsk as part of the 3rd Army. His tenure with the 282nd proved brief as in September Anashkin was appointed commander of the 160th Rifle Division of the 13th Army. With the latter, he was encircled in the area of Trubchevsk during Operation Typhoon in October. The division managed to break out and mounted an organized retreat towards Sevsk and Lgov. In late 1941 and the first half of 1942, Anashkin, promoted to colonel on 9 January, led the division in defensive fighting in the Voronezh region, the Yelets Offensive, the offensive towards Oryol, and the Battle of Voronezh. He was relieved of command of the division in June.

Anashkin did not wait long for a new assignment as in July he took command of the 159th Rifle Division. On 9 July the division joined the 60th Army for fighting on the east bank of the Don and the defense of Voronezh, and on 1 August was withdrawn into the army reserve. From 22 August the division transferred to the 40th Army and was relocated to the Usman area. Attacking towards Voronezh on 12 September, Anashkin's unit assisted in the destruction of the German Chizhovka bridgehead and repulsed counterattacks for the next month. Transferred to the 5th Tank Army, Anashkin led the 159th in the attack towards Morozovsk during Operation Uranus. With the 3rd Guards Army from 14 December, the division fought in Operation Little Saturn and captured Morozovsk, being converted into the 61st Guards Rifle Division for its actions on 15 January; Anashkin received a promotion to major general on the same day.

Anashkin continued to command the 61st Guards during Operation Gallop in early 1943. He rose to command the 19th Rifle Corps on 28 February, and in April he became commander of the new 33rd Rifle Corps, which included the divisions of the 19th. After leading the corps in actions in the area of Starobilsk, Anashkin became commander of the 64th Rifle Corps of the 57th Army in July. From mid-1943 to early 1944, he commanded the corps in the Belgorod–Kharkov Offensive, the capture of Chuguyev and Krasnograd, the attack of the 2nd Ukrainian Front towards Krivoy Rog in October, the two-month defense on the Inhulets north of Krivoy Rog from November, the Bereznegovatoye–Snigirevka Offensive, and the Odessa Offensive.

Transferred to command the 129th Rifle Corps of the 47th Army of the 1st Belorussian Front in May, Anashkin would remain in this position for the rest of the war. His command of the corps included Operation Bagration and the Lublin–Brest Offensive, and from January 1945 the Vistula–Oder Offensive, East Pomeranian Offensive, and the Berlin Offensive. For his "skillful organization" of the actions of the corps in the breakthrough of the German defenses north of Warsaw and the crossing of the Vistula, in which the corps captured Gostynin, Kowal, and Mińsk Mazowiecki, Anashkin received the title Hero of the Soviet Union on 6 April 1945. For his command of the corps in the Berlin Offensive, during which it captured Spandau in the advance into the city, he was awarded the Order of Suvorov, 2nd class.

Hero of the Soviet Union citation

Elements of the 129th Rifle Corps, under the leadership of Guards Major General Comrade Anashkin, acted on the main direction in the area north of Jabłonna-Legionowo, [and on] 15 January 1945 broke through strongly fortified, deeply echeloned, [and] sturdily constructed German defenses and in cooperation with units of the 125th Rifle Corps destroyed units of the German 73rd Infantry Division and up to five guard and sapper battalions. On the move, [the corps] forced the Vistula river and through a deep bypass maneuver captured Warsaw.

Thanks to the deliberate and skillful leadership of Guards Major General Comrade Anashkin, units of the corps made a rapid advance, inflicting exceptionally great losses on the enemy in personnel and equipment. [The corps] captured all the enemy artillery and materiel and more than 2,000 soldiers and officers were taken prisoner, in return for minor losses.

Units of the corps in the fighting advanced 200 kilometers and liberated more than 600 settlements, including the cities of Gombin, Gostynin, Kowal, Bromberg, and others.

For [his] skillful leadership of the combat actions of the units of the corps and personal heroism, displayed in the battles against the German invaders, Guards Major General Comrade Anashkin [is] worthy of the conferral of the title Hero of the Soviet Union.

== Postwar ==
After the end of the war, Anashkin, promoted to lieutenant general on 11 July 1945, continued to command the corps. After its disbandment in May 1946, he was appointed a senior instructor at the Voroshilov Higher Military Academy, but was soon retired on 30 July of that year. Anashkin lived in Moscow, where he died on 23 January 1951, being buried at the Novodevichy Cemetery. His health had been undermined by his imprisonment during the Great Purge and the stresses of combat.

== Awards and honors ==
Anashkin was a recipient of the following decorations:

- Hero of the Soviet Union
- Order of Lenin (2)
- Order of the Red Banner (4)
- Order of Kutuzov, 1st class
- Order of Bogdan Khmelnitsky, 1st class
- Order of Suvorov, 2nd class
- Medals
- Foreign orders
