= 159th =

159th is the ordinal form of the number 159. 159th or One hundred and fifty-ninth may also refer to:

- A fraction, 1/159, equal to one of 159 equal parts

== Geography ==
- 159th meridian east, a line of longitude
- 159th meridian west, a line of longitude
- 159th Street (Chicago)
- 159th Street (Manhattan)

== Military ==
- 159th Brigade (disambiguation)
- 159th Division (disambiguation)
- 159th Regiment (disambiguation)

== See also ==
- June 8, 159th day of the year in a standard year
