= 121st Anti-aircraft Artillery Regiment "Ravenna" =

Active Italian Army SHORAD air-defense unit

- 121° Reggimento Artiglieria Controaerei "Ravenna"
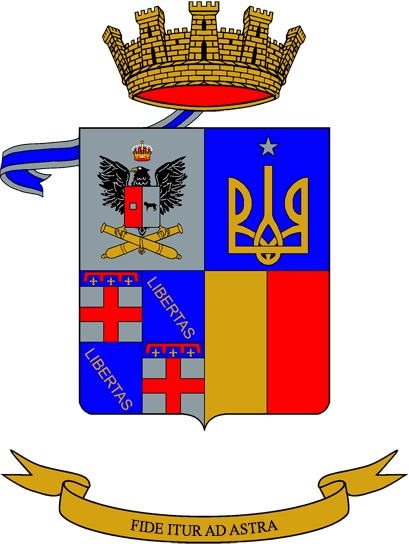
- Regimental coat of arms
- Active: 1 May 1941 – 8 Sept. 1943; 1 March 1951 – today
- Country: Italy
- Branch: Italian Army
- Part of: Anti-aircraft Artillery Command
- Garrison/HQ: Bologna
- Motto: "Fide itur ad astra"
- Anniversaries: 15 June 1918 – Second Battle of the Piave River
- Decorations: 1× Silver Medal of Military Valor

Insignia
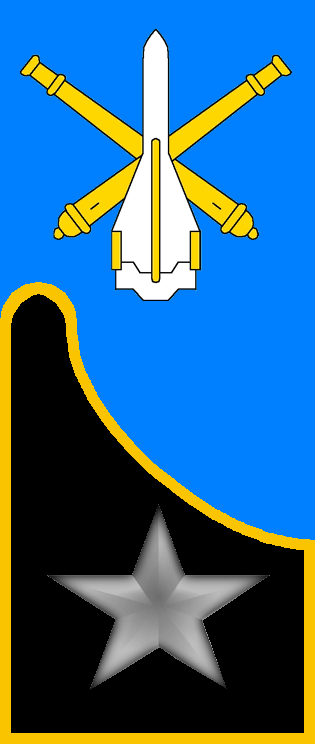
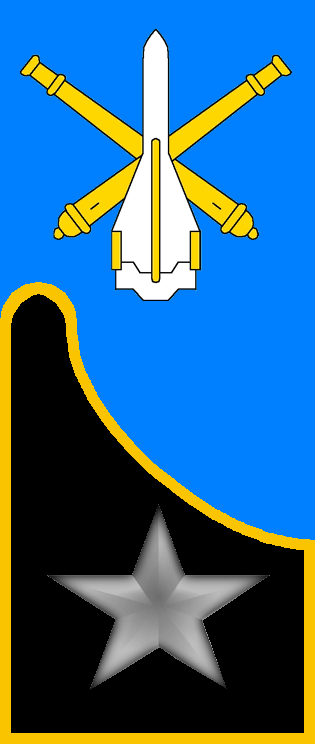
- Regimental gorget patches

The 121st Anti-aircraft Artillery Regiment "Ravenna" (Italian: 121° Reggimento Artiglieria Controaerei "Ravenna") is an air defense regiment of the Italian Army. Originally a field artillery regiment of the Royal Italian Army, the regiment was assigned in World War II to the 3rd Infantry Division "Ravenna", with which the regiment deployed to the Eastern Front, where division and regiment were destroyed during the Red Army's Operation Little Saturn. In 1951, the Italian Army reformed the regiment and, on 15 June 1953, the regiment was transferred from the field artillery to the anti-aircraft specialty. Today the regiment is based in Bologna in the Emilia-Romagna and assigned to the Anti-aircraft Artillery Command. The regiment's batteries are equipped with Skyguard surface-to-air missile systems respectively Stinger man-portable air-defense systems. The regiment's anniversary falls, as for all Italian Army artillery regiments, on June 15, the beginning of the Second Battle of the Piave River in 1918.

== History ==
=== World War II ===
On 1 May 1941, the depot of the 21st Artillery Regiment "Trieste" in Piacenza formed the 121st Artillery Regiment. The regiment consisted of a command, a command unit, and three groups with 75/18 mod. 35 howitzers. In March 1942, the regiment was assigned to the 3rd Infantry Division "Ravenna", which also included the 37th Infantry Regiment "Ravenna" and 38th Infantry Regiment "Ravenna". Upon entering the division the regiment was renamed 121st Artillery Regiment "Ravenna" and reorganized. Afterwards, the regiment consisted of a command, a command unit, the I and II groups with 75/18 mod. 35 howitzers, the XXVIII Group with 105/28 cannons, and the 51st and 303rd anti-aircraft batteries with 20/65 mod. 35 anti-aircraft guns.

The 3rd Infantry Division "Ravenna" was assigned to the Italian 8th Army, which was sent in July 1942 to the Eastern Front. After the arriving in the Soviet Union the regiment added the 71st Anti-tank Battery with 75/39 anti-tank guns. On 16 December 1942, the Red Army commenced Operation Little Saturn, which destroyed most of the Italian 8th Army. The remnants of the Ravenna division were repatriated in April 1943. For its conduct in the Soviet Union the regiment was awarded a Silver Medal of Military Valor, which was affixed to the regiment's flag.

After its return to Italy the regiment was based in Alessandria and being rebuilt with existing units. The regiment received a group with horse-drawn 100/17 mod. 14 howitzers, a group with horse-drawn 75/27 mod. 06 field guns, a group with mule-carried 75/13 mod. 15 mountain guns, and a battery with 20/65 mod. 35 anti-aircraft guns. The regiment was then transferred to Roccastrada in southern Tuscany to support the XVI Coastal Brigade.

In the evening of 8 September 1943, the Armistice of Cassibile, which ended hostilities between the Kingdom of Italy and the Anglo-American Allies, was announced by General Dwight D. Eisenhower on Radio Algiers and by Marshal Pietro Badoglio on Italian radio. Germany reacted by invading Italy and the 121st Artillery Regiment "Ravenna", which was still in the process of being rebuilt, was disbanded soon thereafter by German forces.

=== Cold War ===
On 1 March 1951, the Italian Army reformed the regiment as 121st Field Artillery Regiment in Reggio Emilia. The regiment assigned to the Infantry Division "Trieste", which also included the 21st Field Artillery Regiment. On 1 July 1951, the regiment consisted of command, a command unit, the newly raised I and II groups with M101 105 mm howitzers, and the III Light Anti-aircraft Group with 40/56 autocannons, which had been formed by the Anti-aircraft Artillery School. On 25 August of the same year, the regiment received the IV Self-propelled Anti-tank Group with M18 Hellcat tank destroyers from the Artillery School. On 3 November 1951, the regiment moved from Reggio Emilia to Modena and, on 1 April 1952, the regiment received the V Self-propelled Anti-tank Group with M18 Hellcat tank destroyers.

On 1 January 1953, the regiment transferred its two groups with M18 Hellcat tank destroyers to the 21st Field Artillery Regiment in Modena. On 15 June 1953, the groups of the 21st Field Artillery Regiment were transferred to the 121st Field Artillery Regiment, which was renamed 21st Field Artillery Regiment. On the same day the command and command unit of the now former 21st Field Artillery Regiment moved from Modena to Bologna, where they were used to form the command of the newly formed 121st Heavy Anti-aircraft Artillery Regiment. The new regiment was assigned to the VI Territorial Military Command and consisted of four newly formed anti-aircraft groups: the I, II, and III heavy anti-aircraft groups with American 90/50 M1 anti-aircraft guns, and the V Light Anti-aircraft Group with 40/56 autocannons. The formation of the new groups concluded in 1954.

On 1 April 1956, the V Light Anti-aircraft Group was renumbered IV Light Anti-aircraft Group. On 1 August 1963, the regiment was assigned to the army's Anti-aircraft Artillery Command. On 31 August 1964, the regiment ceded the II Heavy Anti-aircraft Group in Bologna to the 18th Light Anti-aircraft Artillery Regiment, and in turn the 121st Heavy Anti-aircraft Artillery Regiment received the IX Heavy Anti-aircraft Group in Ferrara from the 17th Light Anti-aircraft Artillery Regiment, which upon entering the regiment was renamed II Heavy Anti-aircraft Group. The group remained detached from the regiment at its base in Ferrara.

On 1 March 1970, the regiment received two groups from the 18th Light Anti-aircraft Artillery Regiment: the II Light Anti-aircraft Group with 40mm L/70 autocannons in Reggio Emilia and IV Light Anti-aircraft Group with 40mm L/70 autocannons in Bologna. On the same date the two groups were renumbered as I and II groups and the regiment changed its name to 121st Light Anti-aircraft Artillery Regiment. Afterwards, the regiment's remaining heavy groups were disbanded.

As part of the 1975 army reform the 18th Light Anti-aircraft Artillery Regiment was disbanded on 18 November 1975 and the next day the regiment's two remaining groups joined the 121st Light Anti-aircraft Artillery Regiment. After the reform each of the regiment's four light anti-aircraft groups fielded 471 men (24 officers, 89 non-commissioned officers, and 358 soldiers). The regiment consisted now of the following units:

- 121st Light Anti-aircraft Artillery Regiment, in Bologna
  - Command Unit
  - 1st Light Anti-aircraft Group with 40mm L/70 autocannons, in Reggio Emilia
  - 2nd Light Anti-aircraft Group with 40mm L/70 autocannons, in Bologna
  - 3rd Light Anti-aircraft Group with 40mm L/70 autocannons, in Rimini
  - 4th Light Anti-aircraft Group with 40mm L/70 autocannons, in Ferrara

On 10 March 1977, the 2nd Light Anti-aircraft Group moved from Bologna to Mestre, afterwards the 1st Light Anti-aircraft Group moved from Reggio Emilia to Bologna. From January 1986 to June 1987, the regiment's batteries were deployed to Sicily to protect Italian and American air bases on the island due to the increased tension between the West and Libya. In 1988, the regiment began with the introduction of the Stinger man-portable air-defense systems, followed in 1991 by the introduction of SIDAM 25 self-propelled anti-aircraft guns.

With the end of the Cold War the regiment was reduced in size and, on 17 September 1992, the 3rd Light Anti-aircraft Group in Rimini left the regiment and the next day entered the reformed 18th Anti-aircraft Artillery Regiment. On 30 October of the same year, the 4th Light Anti-aircraft Group in Ferrara was disbanded. On 14 December 1993, the 2nd Light Anti-aircraft Group in Mestre left the regiment and the next day the group was renamed 17th Light Anti-aircraft Artillery Group "Sforzesca". On the same date, 15 December 1993, the regiment changed its name to 121st Anti-aircraft Artillery Regiment.

On 1 October 1997, the regiment was given the name "Ravenna" to commemorate the division it served with during World War II. On 1 January 2002, the regiment was assigned to the Anti-aircraft Artillery Brigade. In October 2002, the command of the 17th Anti-aircraft Artillery Regiment "Sforzesca" in Rimini moved to Sabaudia and the Sforzesca regiment's group with Skyguard surface-to-air missile systems in Rimini joined the 121st Anti-aircraft Artillery Regiment "Ravenna". Upon entering the regiment the group was designated as 2nd Anti-aircraft Group. On 11 September 2009, the Anti-aircraft Artillery Brigade was merged with the Anti-aircraft Artillery School to form the Anti-aircraft Artillery Command.

On 30 September 2019, the 2nd Anti-aircraft Group in Rimini was disbanded and its personnel and materiel merged into the regiment's 1st Anti-aircraft Group in Bologna.

== Organization ==
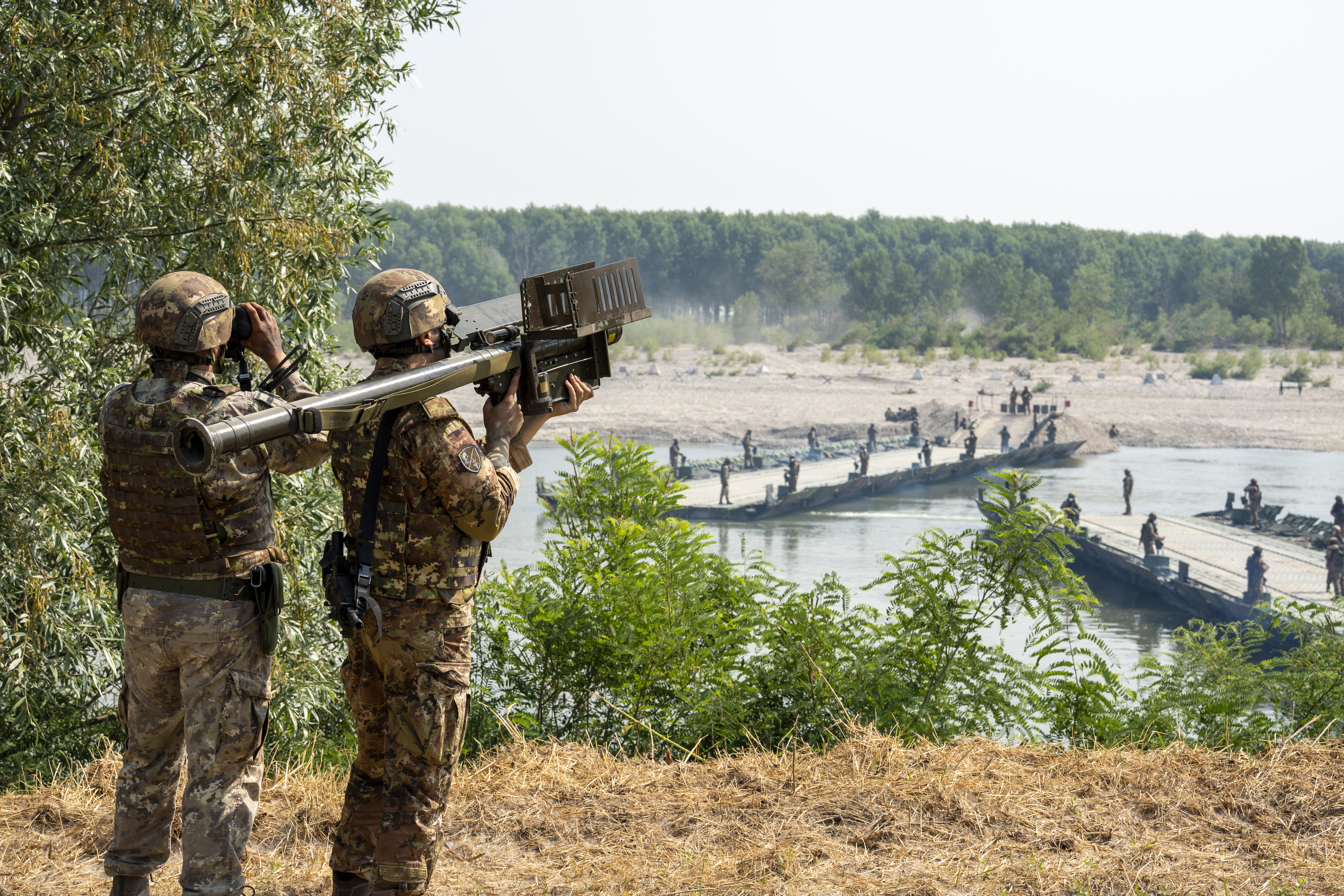
121st Anti-aircraft Artillery Regiment "Ravenna" Stinger team guarding the assembly of a Motorized Floating Bridge by the 2nd Pontieri Engineer Regiment

As of 2025 the 121st Anti-aircraft Artillery Regiment "Ravenna" is organized as follows:

- 121st Anti-aircraft Artillery Regiment "Ravenna", in Bologna
  - Command and Logistic Support Battery
  - Signal Company
  - 1st Group
    - 1st Skyguard Battery
    - 2nd Skyguard Battery
    - 3rd Stinger Battery
    - Fire Control and Support Battery

The regiment's Skyguard surface-to-air missile systems will be replaced by Grifo systems with CAMM-ER surface-to-air missiles in 2026.
