= Val d'Ansiei =

Valley in the Dolomites in Veneto, Italy

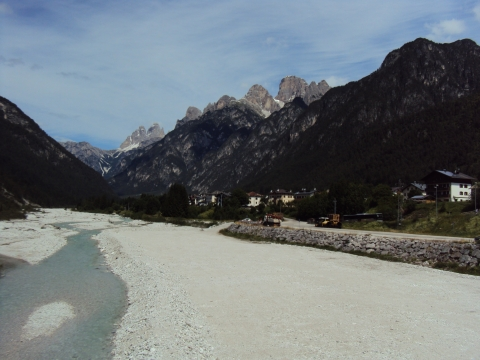
Val d'Ansiei

Val d'Ansiei is a valley in the comune of Cortina d'Ampezzo in the Dolomites of the Veneto region of northern Italy. It contains the mountain refuge, Rifugio Tre Sorelle.
