= 159th Rifle Division (1942–1943) =

159th Rifle Division (January 3, 1942 – January 15, 1943)
- Active: 1942–1943
- Country: Soviet Union
- Branch: Red Army
- Type: Infantry
- Size: Division
- Engagements: Case Blue; Battle of Stalingrad; Operation Uranus; Operation Little Saturn

Commanders
- Notable commanders: Col. Nikolai Sergeevich Timofeev; Col. Mikhail Borisovich Anashkin

The second 159th Rifle Division was formed as an infantry division of the Red Army in January 1942 in the Ural Military District as a redesignation of a 400-series division. It continued slowly forming into spring, when it became part of 60th Army in Voronezh Front. Through July into September it took part in persistent fighting around the city of Voronezh, latterly as part of 40th Army in the same Front. It was then transferred to Southwestern Front, where it came under command of 5th Tank Army in preparation for the winter counteroffensive. Through most of Operation Uranus the 159th acted as its Army's right flank anchor, engaging in local battles along the upper Chir River against German and Romanian forces. Prior to the start of Operation Little Saturn in December it was transferred first to 1st Guards Army and then to 3rd Guards Army, still in the same Front. It took part in the penetration of the German/Romanian front after the offensive was finally launched on December 16, and during the exploitation phase was partially responsible for the encirclement and destruction of large parts of the Italian 8th Army. On January 15, 1943, in recognition of its accomplishments in the Soviet counteroffensive it would become the 61st Guards Rifle Division.

== Formation ==
The 432nd Rifle Division began forming in December 1941 in the South Ural Military District. In January 1942 it was redesignated as the new 159th Rifle Division. Its order of battle, similar to that of the 1st Formation, was as follows:

- 491st Rifle Regiment
- 558th Rifle Regiment
- 631st Rifle Regiment
- 597th Artillery Regiment
- 136th Antitank Battalion
- 135th Antiaircraft Battery
- 243rd Reconnaissance Battalion
- 185th Sapper Battalion
- 460th Signal Battalion (from October 14, unnumbered signal company)
- 207th Medical/Sanitation Battalion
- 139th Chemical Defense (Anti-gas) Company
- 163rd Motor Transport Company
- 445th Field Bakery
- 910th Divisional Veterinary Hospital
- 1667th Field Postal Station
- 1087th Field Office of the State Bank

Col. Nikolai Sergeevich Timofeev, who had been in command of the 432nd, remained in this post. He had previously served as chief of staff of the 1st Motorized Brigade, 237th Rifle Division, and 189th Rifle Division. As of the beginning of February it was still forming in the Ural District, which continued into April when it was transferred to the Moscow Military District. Even in June it was substantially incomplete, with just one company in its sapper battalion, and just one company of signallers. In late May the division was assigned to the 3rd Reserve Army in the Reserve of the Supreme High Command; on July 3 this became the 60th Army and was transferred to Voronezh Front.

=== Battles for Voronezh ===
The main German summer offensive had begun days earlier, with elements of 4th Panzer Army and 2nd Army advancing to the east. The 60th Army was under command of Lt. Gen. M. A. Antoniuk, and was assigned to a sector along the east bank of the Don River north of Voronezh. The 24th Panzer Division crossed the river early on July 5 and entered the city almost unopposed the next day. The 159th was now defending in the vicinity of Bogdanovo. This changed within days as 60th Army was ordered to counterattack the German positions in Voronezh, to be joined on July 17 by the Front's 40th and 6th Armies. 60th Army had three tank corps in support with the objective of breaking out of a salient around Podgornoe in an effort to cut the key road west of the city. In the event, Antoniuk was unable to get his forces underway until July 22, but they immediately made gains that cut the road briefly some 8km west of the city. The 159th did not play any direct role in this fighting, which raged for several days.

On August 7 Colonel Timofeev was removed from his command, charged with "cowardice and traitorous behavior shown in battle," having abandoned the battlefield and failed "to take measures to restore order in parts of the division." He was put on trial and convicted on August 31, sentenced to eight years at hard labor, but this was suspended for the duration of the war. He returned to the front in October as deputy commander of the 270th Rifle Division, eventually moving to command of the 172nd Rifle Division and having his sentence annulled in early 1943. He was promoted to the rank of major general on May 18 of that year and ended the war leading the 160th Rifle Division, retiring in 1960. Col. Mikhail Borisovich Anashkin took command of the 159th on August 16, while also briefly serving concurrently at the head of the other 160th Rifle Division. By the beginning of September the division had been transferred to 40th Army, still in Voronezh Front.

The battles for Voronezh by 40th and 60th Armies continued into late September. Bryansk Front's recreated 38th Army was to attack along the west bank of the Don in cooperation with the 40th and 60th Armies driving across the river from the east bank, north and south of the city. This was planned for August 8 but did not actually start until four days later. The operation soon bogged down on all axes and was halted on August 15. Late in October the 159th was moved to the south, and by November 1 it had joined 5th Tank Army in Southwestern Front.

== Operation Uranus ==
Operation Uranus. Note positions of 5th Tank Army (5TA).

At this time Soviet tank armies were still mixed formations of rifle/cavalry divisions and armored/motorized units. 5th Tank, under command of Maj. Gen. P. L. Romanenko, had, in addition to the 159th, the 14th, 47th and 50th Guards, plus the 119th and 346th Rifle Divisions; its mobile units included the 1st and 26th Tank Corps and 8th Cavalry Corps. The Army, which was to form part of the Front's main shock group along with the neighboring 21st Army, occupied the Serafimovich bridgehead south of the Don, facing a large part of the Romanian 3rd Army. The 159th was in the Army's second echelon near Izbushenskii. Before the main offensive began on November 19 all four of the army's first-echelon rifle divisions conducted a reconnaissance-in-force on the night of November 17/18. This reconnaissance was effective in uncovering and removing minefields and other engineering works and identified many strongpoints in the main defensive line as well as weak spots.

When the actual offensive began on November 19, the division had a strength of about 8,800 personnel, of which about 6,500 were infantry and sappers. It was deployed to the rear of the boundary between the 50th Guards (with armor support) to the east and 119th to the west. The attack began between 0848 and 0850 hours Moscow time. During the first hour the lead divisions overcame the Romanian first defensive positions with relative ease. By early afternoon they had reached the second line, but resistance was stiffening and Romanenko realized the preliminary bombardment had not been as successful as planned; by 1400 he began to commit his two tank corps to complete the breakthrough. Meanwhile, 14th Guards, on the right flank of the shock group and facing the Romanian 9th Infantry Division, had been halted by unexpected heavy fire after gaining just several hundred metres. During the afternoon the 159th began moving to the southwest to reinforce this attack.

At about the same time the left flank regiment of 14th Guards, taking advantage of the progress of 47th Guards and 8th Cavalry Corps to its left, was able to advance as much as 2km. Overall, Southwestern Front had failed to meet its first day objectives, although the position of the Romanian and supporting German forces was rapidly deteriorating. The offensive was renewed on the morning of November 20, with the straightforward mission of carrying out the initial plan. 47th Guards, supported by the KV tanks of 8th Guards Tank Brigade, made slow progress to the southwest along the Tsutskan River against Romanian 7th Cavalry Division until that unit broke and ran. Anashkin's division reached the sector of the 14th Guards at around noon as the latter, joined with the 21st Cavalry Division of 8th Cavalry Corps, was forcing the Romanian 9th Infantry and one regiment of 7th Cavalry back to a new line from Hill 212 to the village of Gusynka, 5km west of Karasev.

On November 21, as most of Romanian 3rd Army was being encircled between 5th Tank and 21st Armies the 159th assisted 14th Guards, along with its other reinforcements, to push the 9th Romanian west and southwest toward the Krivaia River. In the course of this the 21st Cavalry, many men mounted on tanks, overran the headquarters of the Romanian division. Concurrently, the 159th pierced the 9th Infantry's center and began a pursuit of the retreating Romanians that continued up to 16km, capturing the village of Nizhnegorskii on the Krivaia by the end of the day. The combined advance outflanked the 11th Infantry Division of Romanian I Army Corps which forced it to pull its right flank back to the Krivaia as well. Overnight, the 159th, 14th Guards, and 21st Cavalry linked up with the 47th Guards near the confluence of the Krivaia and Chir Rivers. This would soon become the focal point for the German XVII Army Corps, under command of Gen. der Inf. K. Hollidt.

During November 22 the 159th, along with the remainder of the Army's right flank divisions, continued to advance, reaching a line from Belavinskii on the Krivaia, southward to the confluence, and southeast along the Chir past Pichugin and Demin to the region of Chernyshevskaia. Early in the morning, Romanenko was ordered by the Front to transfer the 14th Guards to the 1st Guards Army, which was still largely in reserve, awaiting upcoming operations. This left the 159th as 5th Tank's right wing anchor. Anashkin was now supported by 8th Guards Tanks in a drive to the southwest against the remnants of Romanian I Corps. Three divisions of 1st Guards Army (14th Guards, 203rd and 278th Rifle Divisions) aided this thrust with local attacks. The 159th liberated the villages of Kamenka, Astakhov, and Belavinskii. By now the divisions of I Corps were completely disorganized and exhausted. However, the next day the German XVII Corps began to arrive to reinforce the defenses along the Krivaia north of Bokovskaia with its relatively fresh 62nd and 294th Infantry Divisions; this ultimately prevented the encirclement of the Romanian remnants. Bokovskaia was significant as a Romanian strongpoint and an important road junction.

November 23 also saw the 159th relieve the 21st Cavalry, which was pulled back for a brief rest and refitting. It then swept the remaining forces of Romanian 9th and 14th Infantry Divisions from the east bank of the Chir before digging in. Romanenko also ordered a reconnaissance across the river toward Bokovskaia as his intelligence staff had detected the arrival of Hollidt's Corps and expected counterattacks. Late on the same day forces of the Southwestern and Stalingrad Fronts met and sealed the encirclement of the German forces at Stalingrad.

=== Battles along the Chir ===
Under the plan for the offensive, General Romanenko's Army was expected to clear the east bank of the Chir and capture the main crossing points, but had been largely unsuccessful, especially in the south. By November 24 the 159th was well fortified along its sector from Khokhlachev northwest to Dulenskii (6km east-northeast of Bokovskaia) while continuing probing attacks with its right flank forces toward Bokovskaia. This situation continued the following day as XVII Corps consolidated its positions with the remaining Romanians and the badly battered XXXXVIII Panzer Corps.

The situation of the Army in the sector north of Chernyshevskaia improved on November 26 as the 50th Guards returned, taking up positions on the Chir from Rusakov to Illarionov around noon. The division went into the attack against Romanian 14th Infantry at Chistiakovskaia and 22nd Panzer Division at Chernyshevskaia, forced the river and captured the latter place, advancing as much as 6km farther. The Romanian division was now threatened with encirclement by 50th Guards and parts of 47th Guards and 21st Cavalry. Hollidt was forced to commit his available reserves to a series of fights that would continue into December. Meanwhile, the 159th continued to hold its position on the right flank at the confluence of the two rivers against small groups of Axis infantry on a line from 17km-25km northwest of Chernyshevskaia. This relatively quiet situation persisted into November 27, although according to reports Anashkin sent part of his left-wing regiment to assist the 152nd Guards Rifle Regiment of 50th Guards Division.

By this time the Front commander, Lt. Gen. N. F. Vatutin, was becoming increasing concerned over the attacks of what was now known as Attack Group Hollidt across the Krivaia against 1st Guards Army's 14th Guards and 278th Rifle Divisions. The latter, along with the 266th Rifle Division, attacked during the morning of November 28, with the 159th supporting with fire on the right flank, and despite a lack of tanks threw the two German divisions back across the river. Over the next two days the division continued to hold its line with the support of several battalions of 21st Cavalry, including two bridgeheads over the Chir, and also extended its sector some 10km to the north. Anashkin reported on November 30 that his troops had "repulsed attacks by small enemy groups along the Astakhov and Illarionov line."

== Operation Little Saturn ==
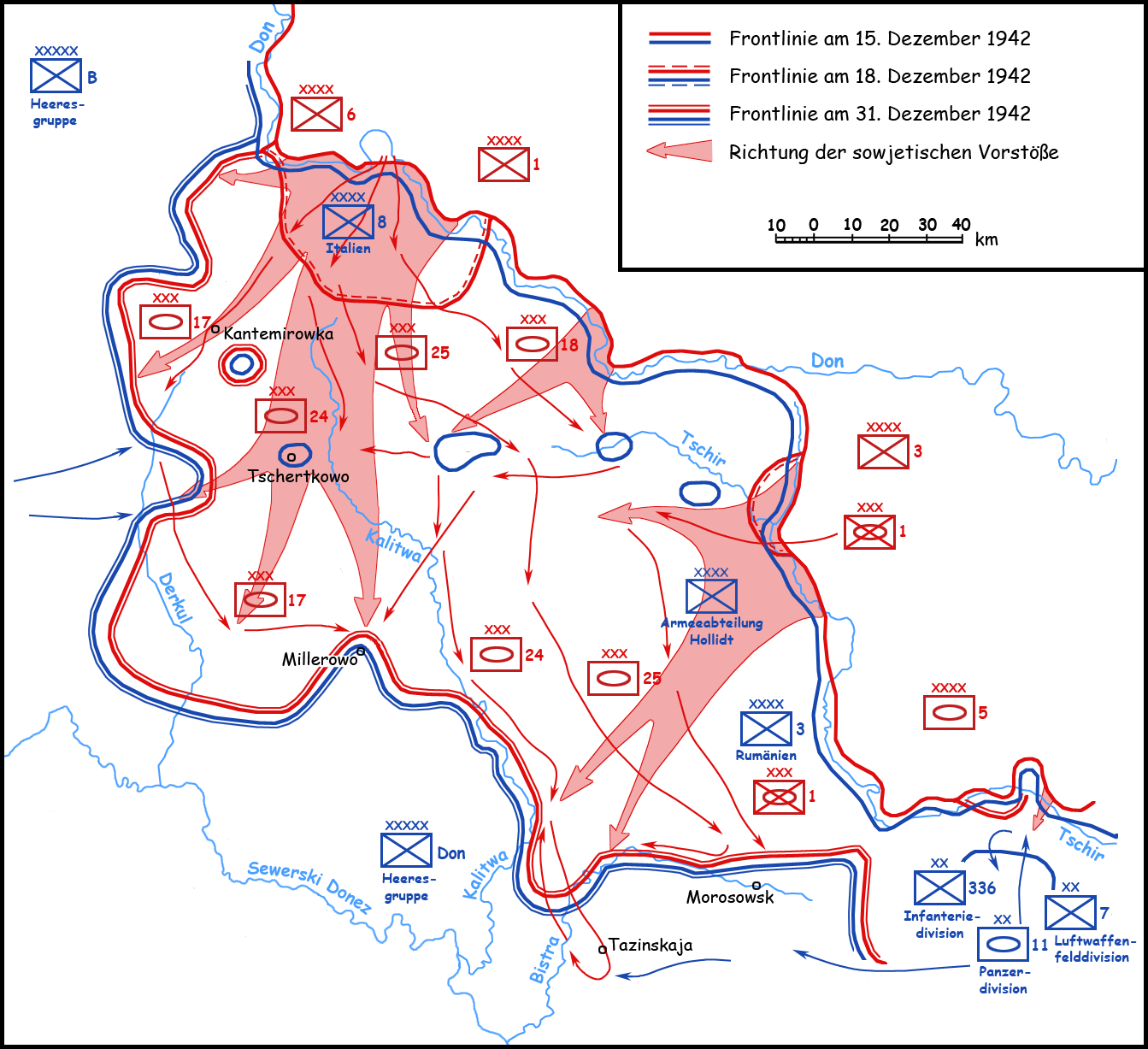
Operation Little Saturn. Note positions of 3rd Guards Army.

Uranus had always been intended as the opening phase of the Soviet winter counteroffensive in the south. Operation Saturn was to follow, in an effort to break through the Italian 8th Army along the Don and advance south to Rostov-on-Don, thus isolating both of German Army Group A and Army Group B. For this purpose Vatutin would have the 6th, 1st Guards, and 2nd Guards Armies, but by late November it was becoming clear that the latter would have to be diverted to south of Stalingrad to prevent Army Group Don from relieving the siege. He therefore issued revised orders on December 2 for what would become known as "Little" Saturn. As part of the regrouping the 159th was transferred to 1st Guards, which was under command of Lt. Gen. D. D. Lelyushenko. The operation would be supported on the left wing by 5th Tank Army, and was to begin on December 10. On December 5 the oversize 1st Guards was split with the creation of 3rd Guards Army; the latter came under Lelyushenko and the division became part of this new formation. In the first week of the month the 159th was ordered to persist in its attacks north of Chernyshevskaia against units of the Romanian II Army Corps.

In the event, the offensive began on December 16. Heavy fog hindered artillery observation and grounded air support so the preliminary bombardment was less effective than planned; in consequence many Axis firing positions remained intact. The 14th Rifle Corps (14th Guards and 203rd Divisions), forming the main shock group, was met with heavy artillery and mortar fire from the forward edge and depth of the defense, manned by the 294th and 62nd Infantry, and made only minor gains. On the morning of December 17 Lelyushenko renewed the offensive with an artillery preparation from 0745 - 0815 hours, but 14th Corps was still unable to break through as of noon. The Army commander now took a page from Romanenko's book from the opening of Uranus and committed his 1st Guards Mechanized Corps to complete the penetration. Beginning at 1300 this attack cleared the forward edge of the defense despite stubborn resistance and began to advance. During the afternoon and overnight the armored troops took Astakhov and Ilin and were fighting for Konkov and Bokovskaya by dawn.

The successes of 1st Guards Mechanized allowed 14th Guards to liberate Dulenskii by the end of December 17, while the 159th and 203rd fought for Sviridov and Krasnokutskaya. On the Army's flanks the positions of the 50th Guards and 197th Rifle Divisions did not change. As the offensive developed on December 18 the 159th was incorporated into 14th Corps, and its three divisions joined the 1st Guards Mechanized in taking Konkov and Bokovskaya as well as Staryi Zemtsov. By the end of this day the 3rd Guards' main attack had advanced 15-20km and had broken through the complete defensive zone. It now began to pursue the German 294th and 62nd, plus the Romanian 7th and 11th, striving to complete their encirclement and destruction in the Kruzhilin area. During the day of December 19 the 14th Rifle and 1st Guards Mechanized Corps, advancing from the south, met the 197th Division advancing from the north in this area, completing 3rd Guards Army's immediate task. However, on the previous day and overnight the Axis managed to pull out a significant portion of its forces from the pocket and consolidate along the south bank of the Chir. Lelyushenko was ordered to immediately turn the Army's main forces to the south and organize an unremitting pursuit.

=== Conversion to Guards ===
Vatutin instructed Lelyushenko to advance with mobile forces on Morozovskii and also to attack into the rear of the German grouping around Tormosin. Elsewhere, by December 24 it was becoming clear that the Axis forces in the Chernyshevskaia area were threatened with encirclement and they began to withdraw. The pursuit by Lelyushenko's left flank continued until December 27. According to a German estimate from December 29-31 the 159th was believed to be at about half-strength, with 4,000-5,000 personnel. In recognition of its successes during the operation the division was redesignated as the 61st Guards Rifle Division on January 15, 1943. Colonel Anashkin was promoted to the rank of major general on the same day; he would be made a Hero of the Soviet Union on April 6, 1945 and reached the rank of lieutenant general on July 11 while in command of the 129th Rifle Corps.
