= 157th Infantry Division "Novara" =

Royal Italian Army formation during World War II

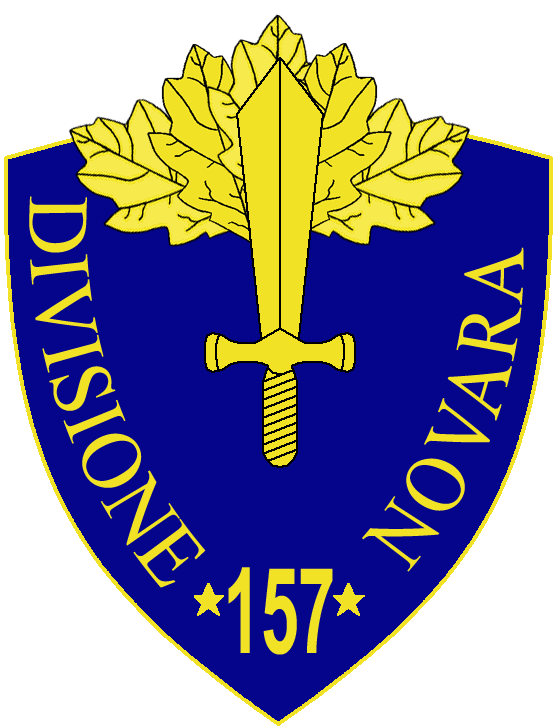
- 157th Infantry Division "Novara" insignia
- Active: 10 March 1942– 1 June 1943
- Country: Kingdom of Italy
- Branch: Royal Italian Army
- Type: Infantry
- Size: Division
- Garrison/HQ: Trieste
- Engagements: Second World War

Insignia
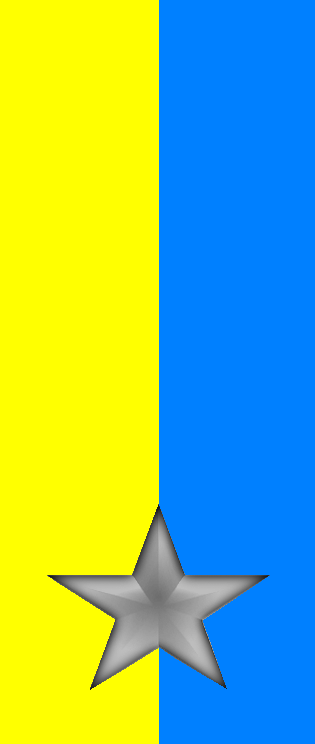
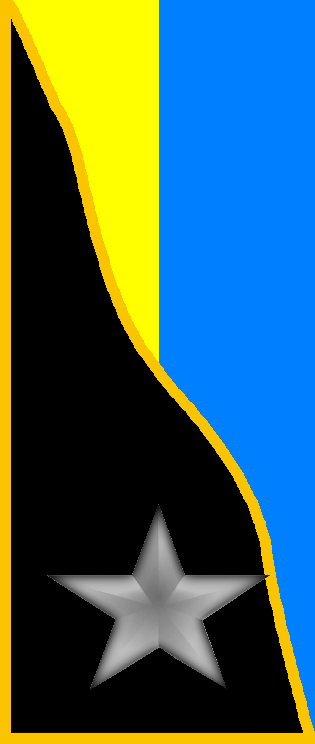
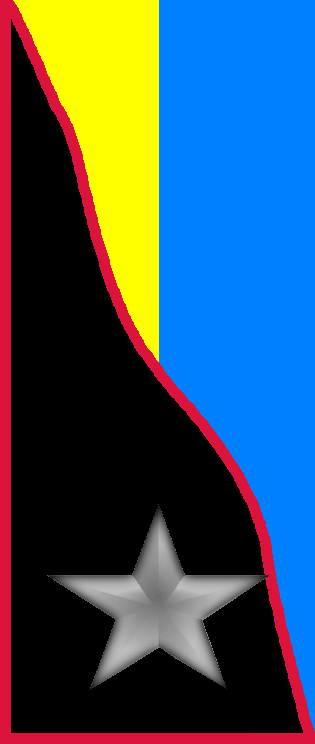
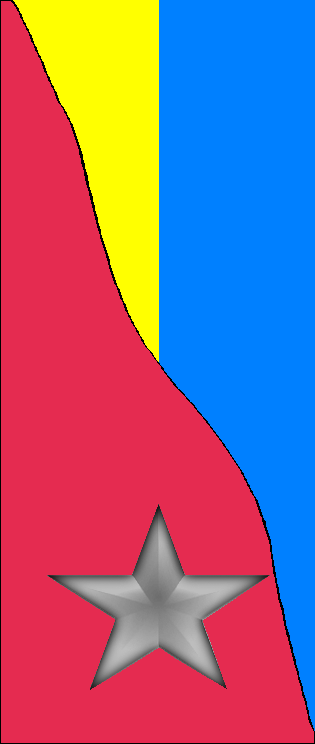
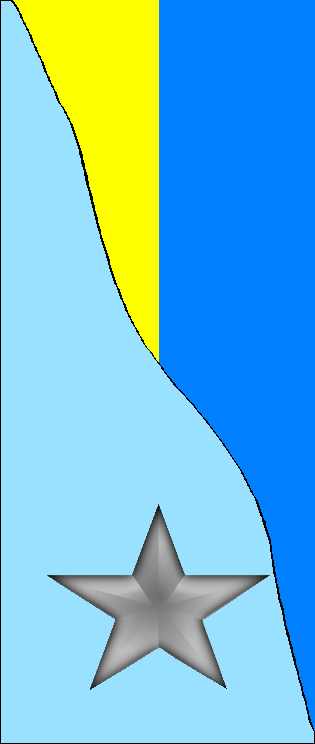
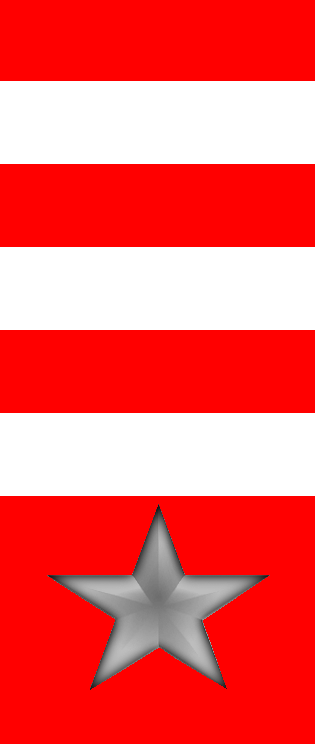
- Identification symbol: Novara Division gorget patches

The 157th Infantry Division "Novara" (Italian: 157ª Divisione di fanteria "Novara") was an infantry division of the Royal Italian Army during the World War II. The Novara was formed on 10 March 1942 and named for the city of Novara. The Novara was classified as an occupation infantry division, which meant that the division's artillery regiment consisted of two artillery groups instead of the three artillery groups of line infantry divisions and that the divisional mortar battalion was replaced by a divisional machine gun battalion. On 1 June 1943 the division was used to reform the 2nd Infantry Division "Sforzesca".

== History ==
=== World War I ===
The division's lineage begins with the Brigade "Novara" raised in March 1915 with the 153rd and 154th infantry regiments. The brigade fought on the Italian front in World War I and together with its regiments was disbanded after the war in November 1919.

=== World War II ===
The 157th Infantry Division "Novara" was activated in Trieste on 10 March 1942 and consisted of the 153rd and 154th infantry regiments, and the 157th Artillery Regiment. As a division raised during the war the Novara did not have its own regimental depots and therefore its regiments were raised by the depots of the 57th Infantry Division "Lombardia": the 153rd Infantry Regiment "Novara" was raised in Trieste on 5 January 1942 by the 73rd Infantry Regiment "Lombardia" and the 154th Infantry Regiment "Novara" was raised in Palmanova on 1 January 1942 by the 74th Infantry Regiment "Lombardia", while the 157th Artillery Regiment "Novara" was raised on 15 April 1942 by the 28th Artillery Regiment "Livorno" in Cuneo.

The division remained in the Venezia Giulia region with its headquarter in Trieste and its units in Divača, Pula, Sežana, and Ilirska Bistrica. The division patrolled the Italian-Yugoslav border to prevent Yugoslav partisans from entering Italian territory. On 1 June 1943 the division was disbanded and its units used to reform the 2nd Infantry Division "Sforzesca", which had been destroyed in winter 1942/43 on the Eastern Front.

The 153rd Infantry Regiment "Novara" became the 53rd Infantry Regiment "Sforzesca", the 154th Infantry Regiment "Novara" became the 54th Infantry Regiment "Sforzesca", and the 157th Artillery Regiment "Novara" became the 17th Artillery Regiment "Sforzesca".

== Organization ==
157th Infantry Division "Novara" organization

- 157th Infantry Division "Novara", in Trieste
  - Headquarters
    - Command Company
    - 138th Carabinieri Section
    - 139th Carabinieri Section
    - 157th Field Post Office
    - 157th Infantry Division Command Transport Squad
  - 153rd Infantry Regiment "Novara"
    - Command Company
    - 3 × Fusilier battalions
    - Cannons Company (47/32 mod. 35 anti-tank guns)
    - Mortar Company (81mm Mod. 35 mortars)
  - 154th Infantry Regiment "Novara"
    - Command Company
    - 3 × Fusilier battalions
    - Cannons Company (47/32 mod. 35 anti-tank guns)
    - Mortar Company (81mm Mod. 35 mortars)
  - 157th Artillery Regiment "Novara"
    - Command Unit
    - I Group (100/17 mod. 14 howitzers; transferred on 15 April 1942 from the 28th Artillery Regiment "Livorno")
    - II Group (75/13 mod. 15 mountain guns; transferred on 15 April 1942 from the 11th Artillery Regiment "Monferrato", and returned to the 11th Artillery Regiment "Monferrato" on 30 April 1942)
    - II Group (75/27 mod. 06 field guns; transferred on 30 April 1942 from the 28th Artillery Regiment "Livorno")
    - 1 × Anti-aircraft battery (20/65 Mod. 35 anti-aircraft guns)
    - Ammunition and Supply Unit
  - CLVII Machine Gun Battalion
  - CLVII Mixed Engineer Battalion
    - 157th Engineer Company
    - 257th Telegraph and Radio Operators Company
  - 157th Anti-tank Company (47/32 mod. 35 anti-tank guns)
  - 157th Medical Section
    - 2 × Field hospitals
    - 1 × Surgical unit
  - 157th Supply Section
  - 1122nd Transport Section

The XXX CC.NN. Battalion was attached to the division.

== Commanding officers ==
The division's commanding officers were:

- Generale di Divisione Vincenzo Paolini (10 March 1942 - 1 June 1943)
