= Ivan Mashchenko =

Red Army colonel

Ivan Ananyevich Mashchenko
- Mashchenko, c. 1940
- Born: June 24, 1895; Ust-Labinskaya, Kuban Oblast, Russian Empire
- Died: 23 June 1941 (aged 45) Near Magerov, Ukrainian SSR, Soviet Union
- Allegiance: Russian Empire; Russian SFSR; Soviet Union
- Branch: Imperial Russian Army; Red Army
- Service years: 1915–1919; 1918–1941
- Rank: Colonel
- Commands: 127th Rifle Division; 159th Rile Division
- Conflicts: World War I; Russian Civil War; World War II; Eastern Front; Operation Barbarossa †
- Awards: Order of the Red Star

Ivan Ananyevich Mashchenko (Russian: Иван Ананьевич Мащенко; 24 June 1895 – 23 June 1941) was a Red Army colonel who commanded the 159th Rifle Division in the opening days of Operation Barbarossa.

== Early life, World War I, and Russian Civil War ==
A Russian, Ivan Ananyevich Mashchenko was born on 24 June 1895 in Ust-Labinskaya, Kuban Oblast. He worked in the fisheries industry at Leonozovo, Baku Governorate, then in the oil industry at Baku from April 1913. Conscripted into the Imperial Russian Army during World War I on 17 May 1915, Mashchenko was sent to the 223rd Reserve Infantry Regiment at Aleksandropol. After graduating from the regimental training detachment in January 1916 he served as a junior and senior unter-ofitser in the Caucasus campaign at Erzurum. Mashchenko was wounded and hospitalized at Baku and Yekaterinodar between June and August, and then until late January 1918 served with the Expeditionary Corps of General Nikolai Baratov in Persia.

During the Russian Civil War, Mashchenko joined the 1st Caucasian Cavalry Regiment of the Caucasian Cavalry Division of the Red Army on 15 February 1918, serving as regimental adjutant and commissar. With the regiment, he fought against the Volunteer Army in Don Host Oblast and in the retreat of the 11th Army from the North Caucasus to Astrakhan via Kizlyar. Mashchenko commanded a platoon of the 37th Cavalry Regiment of the 7th Samara Cavalry Division, formed from the 1st Special Cavalry Division of the army, beginning in April 1919.

He rose to command a squadron of the 40th Cavalry Regiment of the division in September 1920 and a month later became commander of the barrier detachment of the division. With the division, he fought in battles on the Astrakhan steppe and at Tsaritsyn, in the invasions of Azerbaijan and Georgia, the elimination of Ulagay's Landing, and the fighting against the Army of Wrangel at Yuzovka, Melitopol, and Dzhankoy. From January 1921 he returned to squadron command in fighting against the Revolutionary Insurrectionary Army of Ukraine in south Ukraine and the Ukrainian People's Army troops of Yuriy Tyutyunnyk near Kiev.

== Interwar period ==
From August 1922 to September 1924 Mashchenko studied at the Higher Cavalry School in Petrograd, and upon graduation returned to his regiment, now stationed in Belarus. During the next several years, he served as chief of the regimental school of the 40th, commander of the school battalion of the 38th Cavalry Regiment and assistant regimental commander for supply of the 39th Cavalry Regiment. After completing the Remount Commander Improvement Course at Moscow between January and October 1929, Mashchenko became the senior member of the 3rd Ukrainian Remount Commission at Odessa and Kirovo. In October 1930 he became chairman of the 2nd Ukrainian Remount Commission at Kiev.

Mashchenko served on the staff of the Kharkov Military District from June 1935 as chief of the 3rd section of the 4th department, and from November 1937 to February 1938 temporarily commanded the 2nd Reserve Cavalry Regiment. In November 1938, by now a colonel, he became commander of the 66th Reserve Cavalry Regiment. Appointed commander of the 127th Rifle Division on 16 July 1940, he was transferred to command the 159th Rifle Division on 29 July. In the same month, Mashchenko went to the Frunze Military Academy for the Improvement Course for Higher Commanders. After completing the course, he returned to his command on 21 May.

== World War II ==
When Operation Barbarossa began on 22 June 1941, Mashchenko's division was part of the 6th Rifle Corps of the 6th Army. The division was able to hold its positions briefly, utilizing the defenses of the 6th (Rava-Ruska) Fortified Region, giving little ground on the first day of the war. On 23 June, the army commander ordered the division to counterattack the German troops in the gap between the 41st and 97th Rifle Divisions of the corps. In the fighting near Magerov on the same day, Mashchenko was killed by a grenade.

== Awards and honors ==
Mashchenko was a recipient of the following decorations:

- Order of the Red Star
- Jubilee Medal "XX Years of the Workers' and Peasants' Red Army"
- Honorary weapon
