= Bogdanovo, Voronezh Oblast =

Bogdanovo Богданово
- Village
- Location within Voronezh Oblast Location within Russia
- Coordinates: 51°56′N 39°12′E
- Country: Russia
- Region: Voronezh Oblast
- District: Ramonsky District
- Time zone: UTC+3:00

Bogdanovo (Russian: Богданово) is a rural locality (a village) and the administrative center of Gorozhanskoye Rural Settlement, Ramonsky District, Voronezh Oblast, Russia. The population was 708 as of 2010. There are 16 streets.

== Geography ==
Bogdanovo is located on the left bank of the Don River, 11 km northwest of Ramon (the district's administrative centre) by road. Galkino is the nearest rural locality.
