= 159th Rifle Division (1940–1941) =

159th Rifle Division (1st formation)
- Active: July 1940 – September 1941
- Country: Soviet Union
- Branch: Red Army
- Type: Infantry
- Size: 9,548 personnel
- Engagements: Battle of Kiev (1941)

The 159th Rifle Division (Russian: 159-я стрелковая дивизия) (Note: The 159th Rifle Division formed in 1940 was referred to as the 159th Rifle Division (1st formation) by the official list of Red Army units compiled postwar because it was the first of three unrelated units designated the 159th Rifle Division active between 1941 and 1945, although it was not the first unit of the Red Army designated the 159th Rifle Division.) was an infantry division of the Red Army during World War II, active from 1940 to 1941.

Formed in Ukraine in mid-1940, the division fought in the Battle of Kiev and was destroyed in encirclement in late September.

== Formation ==
An unrelated 159th Rifle Division, the first Red Army unit to share the designation, was formed in the Ural Military District in September 1939, but was disbanded in January 1940 to form an officer cadet school.

The designation of the 159th was reused for a division formed in July 1940 in the Kiev Special Military District, under the command of Colonel Ivan Mashchenko, appointed on the 29th. It included the 491st, 558th, and 631st Rifle Regiments, and the 597th Light and 723rd Howitzer Artillery Regiments, in addition to smaller support units. The 159th was assigned to the 5th Army of the district from 5 July to early August, then transferred to the 6th Army of the district between 3 and 17 August. It returned to the 6th Army in early 1941, assigned to the 6th Rifle Corps of the army. Mashchenko, who had departed for advanced training in July 1940, did not return to the division until 21 May.

== World War II ==
The division was at roughly 66% of wartime strength with 9,548 personnel when Operation Barbarossa began on 22 June. They were armed with 8,278 Mosin–Nagant rifles, 3,259 semi-automatic rifles, 305 submachine guns, 391 light machine guns, 173 medium machine guns, 54 45 mm anti-tank guns, 35 76 mm guns, 25 122 mm howitzers, nine 152 mm howitzers, and 147 mortars. Equipment included 395 vehicles and 40 artillery tractors.

The division was able to hold its positions briefly, utilizing the defenses of the 6th (Rava-Ruska) Fortified Region. Despite its casualties, the 159th only retreated 1–2 kilometers (0.62–1.24 mi) on the first day of the war. On 23 June, the army commander ordered the division to counterattack the German troops in the gap between the 41st and 97th Rifle Divisions of the corps. In the fighting near Magerov on the same day, Mashchenko was killed by a grenade.

Lieutenant Colonel Nikolay Semyonov, deputy commander of another division, was appointed commander of the 159th on 28 June. By this time the division and its corps had been transferred to the 26th Army. Semyonov took command of the 159th as it retreated from the vicinity of Tarnopol. The division was then tasked with moving to Volochysk to defend positions there with a tank unit and slow down the German advance. In five days of fighting there, the 159th suffered heavy losses but was able to accomplish its goal.

The division was subsequently sent to the city of Belaya Tserkov for rebuilding, and was assigned the 91st Border Detachment, a rifle regiment, and a corps artillery regiment. With these forces, it took up defensive positions west of Belaya Tserkov, and defended them for six days. The division was flanked by the German advance and encircled 15–20 kilometers (9.3–12.4 mi) from the city. For two days the 159th fought to break out and managed to accomplish this, reaching the main forces of the 26th Army in the Staritsy (now around the villages of Velyka Starytsya and Mala Starytsya) area.

The 159th was tasked with defending positions west of Rzhyshchiv to prevent a German crossing of the Dnieper. After five days the division handed over its sector to the 45th Tank Division (fighting as infantry) and went to Kaniv to be rebuilt. The division later defended Kaniv for fifteen days against the German advance and covered the crossing of the Dnieper by the 5th Cavalry Corps. The division then crossed the river and defended positions on the opposite bank. In mid-September Semyonov went to the army staff, and was succeeded on 16 September by Colonel Nikolay Fedotov, deputy commander of another division. In the Battle of Kiev in late September the 159th was destroyed in encirclement with most of the 26th Army, with its commander being reported missing. According to one of the army's last reports, on 22 September, the 159th was fighting in encirclement at Kandybovka northwest of Orzhytsia, and repeated breakout attempts had failed.

On paper, the division, though it had long ceased to exist, was officially disbanded on 27 December 1941.
