= 203rd Rifle Division =

203rd Rifle Division (Feb 1942 – 1946; 1953–1955) 33rd Rifle Brigade (1946–1953) 30th Rifle Division (1955–1957) 102nd Motor Rifle Division (1957–1965) 203rd Motor Rifle Division (1965–1989) 5204th Weapons and Equipment Storage Base (1989–2006) 7th Separate Mechanized Brigade (2006–present)
- Active: 1942–present
- Country: Soviet Union (1942–1991); Kazakhstan (1992–present)
- Branch: Soviet Army (1942–1991); Ground Forces of the Republic of Kazakhstan (1992–present)
- Type: Motorized infantry
- Size: Division
- Garrison/HQ: Karaganda
- Engagements: World War II; Battle of Stalingrad; Donbas Strategic Offensive; Nikopol-Krivoy Rog Offensive; Odessa Offensive; Second Jassy–Kishinev Offensive; Battle of Debrecen; Siege of Budapest; Bratislava-Brno Offensive; Invasion of Manchuria
- Decorations: Order of the Red Banner; Order of Suvorov, 2nd class
- Battle honours: Zaporizhia; Khingan

Commanders
- Notable commanders: Gavriil Zdanovich

The 203rd Rifle Division was an infantry division of the Soviet Union's Red Army.

== World War II ==
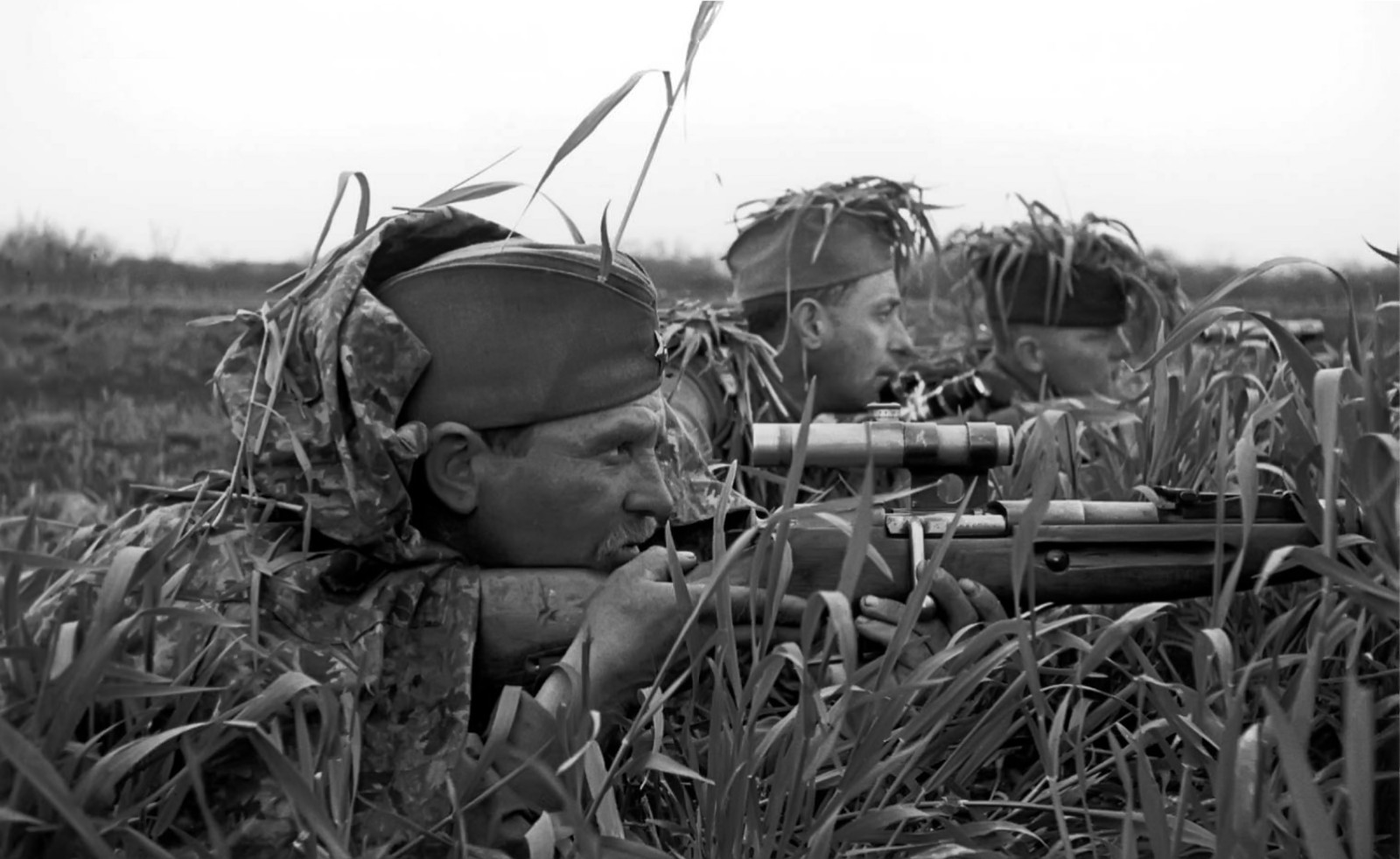
Division snipers Senior Sergeant Ivan Petrovich Merkulov and Sergeant Ardalion Vladimirovich Zolotov at a firing position, 1944

The division was formed in the Kuban near Labinsk, Kurgan and Mikhailovka from February to 20 May 1942. During the second half of May the division left the Kuban. At the end of the month at Frolovo, the division received missing weapons and vehicles. It continued training at a faster pace. The division then moved to the front and until August built defensive positions on the Don northwest of Vyoshenskaya.

On 18 August, the division received orders to cross the Don near Elanskaya village. Three days were spent on preparations for the assault. The attack began on the night of 22 August. The crossing was reportedly so fast that opposing Italian troops were unable to put up much resistance. On 26 August, the 610th and 619th Rifle Regiments went on the attack from the bridgehead and advanced 10 kilometers, capturing the Bahmutkin and Shirtikov farms. Three hours later, the enemy counterattacked and the regiments retreated in disarray. The division and regimental commanders were relieved of command.

On 31 August, the 592nd Rifle Regiment transferred to the division from the 197th Rifle Division. Two battalions of the regiment took up defensive positions on the right flank. The 197th was on the 203rd's right and the 14th Guards Rifle Division on its left. On 6 October, the division was transferred to the 21st Army. On 18 October, advanced units of the division carried out a reconnaissance in force of Hill 226.7. In early November, the division was subordinated to the 1st Guards Army, with which it would fight in Operation Uranus. The 592nd, 610th and 619th Rifle Regiments received the mission to advance and reach the Don. Then, the regiments would advance to the Chir River and hold positions there, protecting the Southwestern Front's right flank against counterattacks from the west.

On 19 November, Operation Uranus began. By 0700 on the morning of 22 November, the division overcame fierce resistance and captured the enemy second line positions. Pursuing retreating forces by noon, the division advanced 10–12 kilometers to the southwest. By the morning of 23 November, the 592nd and 610th Rifle Regiments had resumed the attack and advanced another 2–3 kilometers. However, heavy enemy fire halted the advance. At dawn on 24 November, the German troops began a counterattack. During 25–26 November, the 592nd and 619th Rifle Regiments were forced by the counterattacks to retreat 500 to 800 meters.

On 13 December, the division moved to positions east of Krasnokutskaya and was relieved by the 159th Rifle Division. The division fought in Operation Little Saturn with the 3rd Guards Army. The 1243rd Anti-Tank Artillery Regiment and two battalions were ordered to capture Krasnokutskaya, Novaya Kultura and Golensky. By the first day of the attack the division was to advance to the Sovkhoz Krasnaya Zarya and Talova. On the right the 159th Rifle Division attacked and on the left the 50th Guards Rifle Division attacked. The Chir River, which needed to be crossed, was 20–30 meters at this point, but was covered with thin ice. The banks were icy and steep. On the other bank of the river, there were enemy firing points. On 14 December, the division moved to its starting positions. Sappers dug paths to the river, prepared ladders, bridges and fascines.

On the morning of 16 December, the division began the attack after a 75-minute artillery barrage. The 610th Rifle Regiments captured a kurgan one and a half kilometers from the farm and captured Ilyavinov, as well as ten anti-tank guns with ammunition. Until 20 December, the division attacked the enemy multiple times a day, despite severe ammunition shortages. However, they were unable to capture Krasnokutskaya. The 619th Rifle Regiment was transferred from the division's right to its left to reinforce that flank. On 23 December, the 592nd Rifle Regiment captured Krasnokutskaya and the next the division began the pursuit.

On 25 December, the division was ordered to reach the area of the village and assist the Tatsinskaya Raid. The division made a 120-kilometer march south and by the end of 27 December concentrated at the village of Skosyrskaya. On 29 December, the division, after repulsing several German counterattacks, went on the offensive. The neighboring 266th Rifle Division's 1006th Rifle Regiment was attacked by German tanks approaching Skosyrskaya and withdrew into the 203rd's positions. Zdanovich ordered the regiment to defend the western edge of Grinyova. By the evening, the 1006th's commander found the headquarters of the 266th, and the regiment returned to subordination of the 266th. The 203rd was running out of ammunition and began a withdrawal. The 592nd left the Grinev farm and crossed to the right bank quickly. Advance units of the 610th and 619th moved positions. On 31 December, the division was relieved by the 1st Mechanized Corps and moved to the area of the Petrovsky farm for rest and resupply.

Two hours before New Year 1943, the division was ordered to retake their old positions on the river north of Bystraya. At 0700, the division attacked after a short artillery barrage and Katyusha salvo. The division captured Grinyov and Nizhny Nikolayev in the next half-hour. The German troops retreated to their defenses at Skosyrskoy. Until 8 January, the division fought to capture and hold Skosyrskaya. The division was reinforced with the 24th Tank Corps and captured Zahara Oblivsakya and Kryukov. On 16 January, Zarubin and the Mikhailovskaya farm were captured. The division was supported by the 25th Tank Corps. On 17 January, the division captured the Krutensky farm and Pogorelov on the next day. The division moved to the Kalitvenskaya and Varguny areas soon after.

On 12 August 1944, the division reached the Prut in the second echelon of the 2nd Ukrainian Front.

It fought at Stalingrad, Zaporizhia, and Budapest. With 53rd Army of the 2nd Ukrainian Front in May 1945.

== Postwar ==
The division was reduced to the 33rd Rifle Brigade in 1946 at Kansk. In 1947, the brigade moved to Karaganda.

On 25 June 1957, in Semipalatinsk, Semipalatinsk Oblast, the 102nd Motorised Rifle Division was established from the 30th Rifle Division. It was part of the 17th Army Corps, Turkestan Military District. On 11 January 1965 the division was redesignated the 203rd Pomeranskaya Red Banner order of Suvorov Motorised Rifle Division. The division was stationed at Semipalatinsk, Semipalatinsk Oblast (June 1957 – 1958); Chardzhou, Chardzhou Oblast, 1958 – 1969, and Karaganda, Karaganda Oblast, 1969 – May 1992.

On 7 May 1992 the formation (the 5204th Weapons and Equipment Storage Base since November 1989) was taken over by Kazakhstan. On October 19, 2006, based on the 5204th Base for storage military equipment, the 7th Mechanised Brigade (Military Unit No. 31775), in the village board (until 2003 – Village Green Beam), 4 kilometers east of Karaganda. At the grand building in front of the brigade personnel, the Minister of Defence of the Republic of Kazakhstan, Lieutenant-General Mukhtar Altynbaev handed a new battle flag to the brigade commander, Lt. Col. Ruslan Saduyev. On May 7, 2008, in Karaganda hosted the first military parade in the city's history, which was attended by units of the 7th Independent Mechanised Brigade. The parade was dedicated to the 16th anniversary of the Armed Forces and took place in Independence Square.

The full name of the formation in Kazakh service is now the 7th Separate Mechanized Brigade (Russian: 7-я отдельная Запорожско-Хинганская Red Banner ордена Суворова II степени).
