= Yarskoy 1-y =

Yarskoy 1-y Ярской 1-й
- Khutor
- Location within Volgograd Oblast Location within Russia
- Coordinates: 49°59′N 42°38′E
- Country: Russia
- Region: Volgograd Oblast
- District: Kumylzhensky District
- Time zone: UTC+4:00

Yarskoy 1-y (Russian: Ярской 1-й) is a rural locality (a khutor) in Sulyayevskoye Rural Settlement, Kumylzhensky District, Volgograd Oblast, Russia. The population was 472 as of 2010. There are 20 streets.

== Geography ==
Yarskoy 1-y is located in forest steppe, on Khopyorsko-Buzulukskaya Plain, on the bank of the Kumylga River, 18 km north of Kumylzhenskaya (the district's administrative centre) by road. Nikitinsky is the nearest rural locality.
